= 2022 Kansas State Treasurer election =

- November 8, 2022

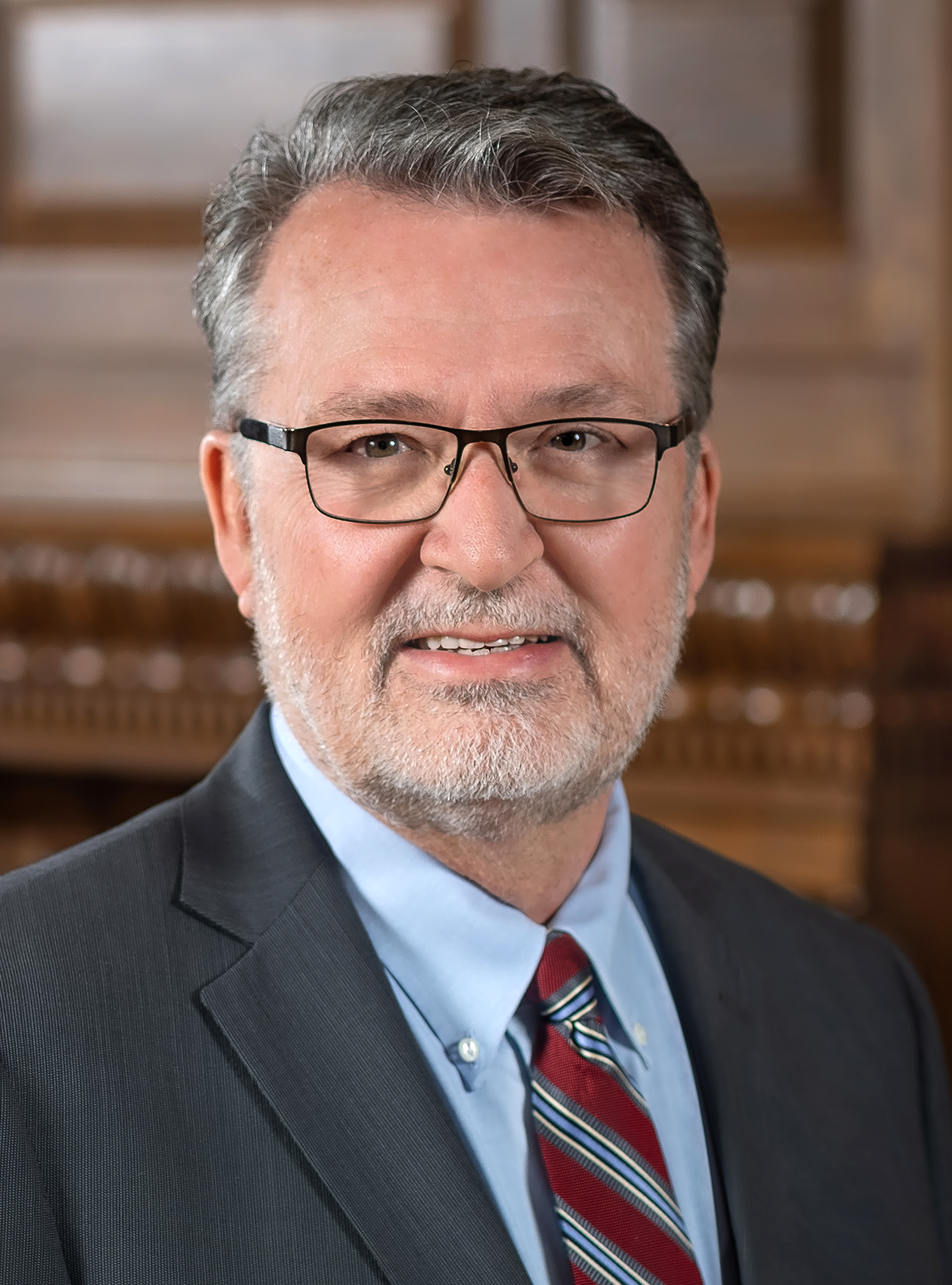
Nominee	Steven Johnson	Lynn Rogers
Party	Republican	Democratic
Popular vote	537,488	411,813
Percentage	54.03%	41.39%
- Johnson: 40–50% 50–60% 60–70% 70–80% 80–90% >90% Rogers: 40–50% 50–60% 60–70% 70–80% 80–90% >90% Roberts: >90% Tie: 30–40% 40–50% 50% No votes
State Treasurer before election
Lynn Rogers
Democratic
Elected State Treasurer
Steven Johnson
Republican

The 2022 Kansas State Treasurer election took place on November 8, 2022, to elect the next Kansas State Treasurer. Incumbent Democrat Lynn Rogers was appointed on January 2, 2021, after his predecessor, Jake LaTurner, resigned after being elected to Congress. Republican Steven Johnson defeated Rogers in the general election.

== Democratic primary ==
=== Candidates ===
==== Nominee ====
- Lynn Rogers, incumbent state treasurer, former lieutenant governor (2019–2021)

=== Results ===
Democratic primary
Party	Candidate	Votes	%
Democratic	Lynn Rogers (incumbent)	249,919	100%
Total votes		249,919	100.00

== Republican primary ==
=== Candidates ===
==== Nominee ====
- Steven Johnson, state representative from the 108th district (2011–)

==== Eliminated in primary ====
- Caryn Tyson, state senator from the 12th district (2013–) and candidate for Kansas's 2nd congressional district in 2018

==== Withdrew ====
- Michael Austin, economist and former advisor to governor Sam Brownback
- Sara Hart Weir, former CEO of the National Down Syndrome Society and candidate for Kansas's 3rd congressional district in 2020

=== Endorsements ===
Steven Johnson

State legislators

- 42 state legislators

County treasurers

- 16 county treasurers
Sara Hart Wier

Organizations

- Maggie's List

=== Polling ===
Poll source	Date(s) administered	Sample size (Note: Key: A – all adults; RV – registered voters; LV – likely voters; V – unclear)	Margin of error	Michael Austin	Sara Hart-Weir	Steven Johnson	Caryn Tyson	Undecided
Remington Research Group (R) (Note: Poll conducted for Keep Kansas Conservative PAC)	September 1–2, 2021	800 (LV)	± 3.3%	6%	10%	10%	9%	65%

=== Results ===
Because the race was so close, no winner was declared for over two weeks. Under a law passed in 2022, because the margin between the candidates was below 1%, a recount was automatically triggered. The recount affirmed Johnson's narrow victory and Tyson conceded the race on August 19, 17 days after the primary.

Republican primary
Party	Candidate	Votes	%
Republican	Steven Johnson	219,449	50.05%
Republican	Caryn Tyson	218,975	49.95%
Total votes		438,424	100.00

== Libertarian convention ==
=== Nominee ===
- Steve Roberts, former member of the Kansas Board of Education and Republican candidate for U.S. Senate in 2020

== General election ==
=== Forum ===
2022 Kansas State Treasurer candidate forum
No.	Date	Host	Moderator	Link	Democratic	Republican	Libertarian
Key: P Participant A Absent N Not invited I Invited W Withdrawn							
Key: P Participant A Absent N Not invited I Invited W Withdrawn					Lynn Rogers	Steven Johnson	Steve Roberts
1	Oct. 26, 2022	KTWU; Washburn University; Political Science Department	Bob Beatty	YouTube	P	P	P

=== Results ===
2022 Kansas State Treasurer election
Party	Candidate	Votes	%
Republican	Steven Johnson	537,488	54.03
Democratic	Lynn Rogers (incumbent)	411,813	41.39
Libertarian	Steve Roberts	45,540	4.58
Total votes		994,841	100.00
Republican gain from Democratic			

==== By congressional district ====
Johnson won three of four congressional districts.

District	Rogers	Johnson	Representative
1st	34%	62%	Tracey Mann
2nd	41%	55%	Jake LaTurner
3rd	49%	45%	Sharice Davids
4th	40%	57%	Ron Estes
