= Sedition Caucus =

American political term

In American politics, "Sedition Caucus", "Treason Caucus", or "Seditious Caucus" is a pejorative term for the Republican members of the 117th United States Congress who voted against the certification of Joe Biden's victory in the 2020 presidential election. The votes, triggered by representatives objecting to the electoral results from Arizona and Pennsylvania, occurred hours after rioters supporting incumbent President Donald Trump stormed the Capitol building to disrupt the vote. The term, referring to a Congressional caucus, does not refer to a formal group. Rather, it implies that the members of Congress who voted to object are in favor of or guilty of sedition, and had a direct or indirect role in the Capitol storming. It originated with the media, and has been used by political opponents of the Republicans, but also by scholars.

While the term was originally used to describe members of Congress who voted against the certification of the electoral vote in the 2020 presidential election, its use has since become somewhat broader (but still related to the aftermath of the 2021 Capitol attack). For example, it was used to describe the senators who voted "not guilty" in the second impeachment trial of Donald Trump.

== Origins and use ==
=== Historical context ===
Before the Electoral College certification vote, Donald Trump had attempted to overturn the results of the election for two months, promoting the Stop the Steal conspiracy theory that he had won, and filing dozens of lawsuits at the state level that were ruled against or dismissed. On December 2, 2020, Politico reported that Representative Mo Brooks of Alabama was planning to object to the counting of the electoral votes from several states won by Biden. On December 30, 2020, Senator Josh Hawley of Missouri became the first senator to announce he would object to the vote certification, meaning the objection would need to be considered by Congress.

Several Republican members of Congress who previously stated that they would object, including Senator Kelly Loeffler of Georgia, who had announced her intention to object at a campaign rally with Trump, chose not to do so following the Capitol riot.

In April, Representative Liz Cheney, a Republican who did not vote to object to Biden's win, said she was considering a presidential run. She also indicated a belief that such objecting should be seen as "disqualifying" other presumptive Republican nominees, "particularly the senators who led the unconstitutional charge".

=== Reactions to the objections ===
==== Media and emergence of the term ====
Even before the Capitol riot, some political commentators began using the term "Sedition Caucus". One of the earliest known uses of the term is from an Orlando Sentinel editorial on December 31, which noted that "about a dozen senators declared they're joining what's disparagingly being called the Sedition Caucus to overturn the election, despite Majority Leader Mitch McConnell's warnings against such a move." Another early use of the term is by CNN host Jake Tapper on January 3, who said "Senator Ben Sasse of Nebraska slammed Hawley and others of the Sedition Caucus saying, 'adults don't point a loaded gun at the legitimate government.'" The next day, The Atlantic published a column by Tom Nichols where he used the term, referencing Tapper. In a January 5 column entitled "A really bad day for the 'Sedition Caucus'", political columnist Jennifer Rubin used the term to refer to the group of senators, calling them "the 'Sedition Caucus' — or the 'Dirty Dozen', if you prefer." (Note: At the time, twelve senators had announced they would object to the certification. Kelly Loeffler also announced she would object, leading Rubin to call the group the "Dirty Baker's Dozen". However, following the storming of the U.S. Capitol, several of these Republican senators dropped their objections, leading only six to object to Arizona and seven to object to Pennsylvania. Rubin then referred to the six who objected to Arizona as the "Dirty Half Dozen".)

Use of the term is highly critical. Conservative columnist Max Boot compared Sedition Caucus members to Senator Joseph McCarthy and he argued that they should similarly "see their careers crash and burn". Rubin argued that the senators should be expelled from the Senate or removed from the Republican caucus and Senators Ted Cruz, Josh Hawley, and John Kennedy should be disbarred, and that members of the House should be primaried or face third party opponents. Some members of the Sedition Caucus have faced calls for their resignation.

==== Political opponents ====
In February, a Democratic super PAC called the Sedition Caucus PAC was formed to pursue negative campaigning against House Republicans in swing districts.

In June 2021, Democratic U.S. Representative Gerry Connolly used the term, saying he thought McCarthy "would probably appoint people from the Sedition Caucus" to a proposed January 6 commission.

==== Scholars ====
Scholars have also used the term when analyzing the objections of these Republicans as a norm-breaking political phenomenon. Political scientist Sarah Binder noted that the majority of Sedition Caucus members come from very red districts, while Republicans in swing districts mostly voted against the objection. Binder also noted a divide between Senate Republican leadership, which overwhelmingly voted against the objection, and House Republican leadership, which overwhelmingly voted in favor of it, arguing that House Minority Leader Kevin McCarthy "led the Sedition Caucus" and attracted Republican votes to object.

Political scientist Hans Noel said he believed the Sedition Caucus and their "progenitors" come from a common strain of racism, comparing their beliefs to Barack Obama citizenship conspiracy theories, Shelby County v. Holder, poll taxes, literacy tests, and white primaries. Michael Latner, a political scientist with the Union of Concerned Scientists, argued that the Sedition Caucus showed the need for legislation aimed at curbing political power, such as the For the People Act and a renewal of the Voting Rights Act of 1965, as well as additional political parties and different voting systems.

== Effect on political donations ==
The public outcry reduced some donors' willingness to fund Republican candidates associated with the Sedition Caucus.

On January 11, several major corporations pulled political funding for candidates who objected to Biden's victory.

By June, however, many of these corporations had resumed donations, according to a report by Citizens for Responsibility and Ethics in Washington (CREW). The most generous of these was Toyota, which gave more than double that of the second-highest donor, Cubic Corporation.

On January 21, The Lincoln Project, a conservative anti-Trump political action committee, announced it would run ads against Sedition Caucus members.

On January 21, the progressive advocacy group Public Citizen reported that Big Tech companies and employees had given nearly $2 million (~$2.63 million in 2025) to Sedition Caucus members since 2016. Six days later, Public Citizen reported that fossil fuel companies and executives had donated $8.8 million to Sedition Caucus members.

In July 2021, Toyota announced it would no longer donate to members of Congress who voted against certifying the 2020 election. Toyota again resumed donations in April 2022.

== Other uses ==
Following the events at the U.S. Capitol, the editorial board of The Capital Times, a newspaper in Madison, Wisconsin, argued that the Wisconsin Legislature has its own Sedition Caucus: 15 state legislators who signed a letter to Vice President Mike Pence asking him to reject the Electoral College vote certification.

After the second impeachment trial of Trump in 2021, which was related to the insurrection, journalist John Nichols used the term to describe the 43 Republican senators who voted not to convict Trump.

== Members of Congress described by the term ==
A total of 147 members of Congress voted in some form to invalidate the electoral college vote count of the 2020 presidential election: 139 in the House of Representatives, and 8 in the Senate.

=== Senate ===
The eight Republican senators who would be part of the Sedition Caucus by the original definition include:

Portrait	Name	State	Voted to reject the electoral votes from		Current incumbent?
Portrait	Name	State	Arizona	Pennsylvania	Current incumbent?
	Ted Cruz	Texas	✓	✓	✓
	Josh Hawley	Missouri	✓	✓	✓
	Cindy Hyde-Smith	Mississippi	✓	✓	(lost re-election)
	John Kennedy	Louisiana	✓	✗	✓
	Cynthia Lummis	Wyoming	✗	✓	(retiring)
	Roger Marshall	Kansas	✓	✓	(lost re-election)
	Rick Scott	Florida	✗	✓	✓
	Tommy Tuberville	Alabama	✓	✓	(retiring)

=== House of Representatives ===
The 139 Republican members of the House of Representatives who would be part of the sedition caucus by the original definition include (alphabetically by each state):

Name	District	Voted to reject the electoral votes from	
Name	District	Arizona	Pennsylvania
Robert Aderholt	AL-4	✓	✓
Mo Brooks	AL-5	✓	✓
Jerry Carl	AL-1	✓	✓
Barry Moore	AL-2	✓	✓
Gary Palmer	AL-6	✓	✓
Mike Rogers	AL-3	✓	✓
Andy Biggs	AZ-5	✓	✓
Paul Gosar	AZ-4	✓	✓
Debbie Lesko	AZ-8	✓	✓
David Schweikert	AZ-6	✗	✓
Rick Crawford	AR-1	✓	✓
Ken Calvert	CA-42	✓	✓
Mike Garcia	CA-25	✓	✓
Darrell Issa	CA-50	✓	✓
Doug LaMalfa	CA-1	✓	✓
Kevin McCarthy	CA-23	✓	✓
Devin Nunes	CA-22	✓	✓
Jay Obernolte	CA-8	✓	✓
Lauren Boebert	CO-3	✓	✓
Doug Lamborn	CO-5	✓	✓
Kat Cammack	FL-3	✓	✓
Mario Diaz-Balart	FL-25	✓	✓
Byron Donalds	FL-19	✓	✓
Neal Dunn	FL-2	✓	✓
Scott Franklin	FL-15	✓	✓
Matt Gaetz	FL-1	✓	✓
Carlos A. Giménez	FL-26	✓	✓
Brian Mast	FL-18	✓	✓
Bill Posey	FL-8	✓	✓
John Rutherford	FL-4	✓	✓
Greg Steube	FL-17	✓	✓
Daniel Webster	FL-11	✓	✓
Rick W. Allen	GA-12	✓	✓
Buddy Carter	GA-1	✓	✓
Andrew Clyde	GA-9	✓	✓
Marjorie Taylor Greene	GA-14	✓	✓
Jody Hice	GA-10	✓	✓
Barry Loudermilk	GA-11	✓	✓
Russ Fulcher	ID-1	✓	✓
Mike Bost	IL-12	✓	✓
Mary Miller	IL-15	✓	✓
Jim Baird	IN-4	✓	✓
Jim Banks	IN-3	✓	✓
Greg Pence	IN-6	✗	✓
Jackie Walorski	IN-2	✓	✓
Ron Estes	KS-4	✓	✓
Jake LaTurner	KS-2	✓	did not vote (Note: LaTurner missed the Pennsylvania vote due to a positive COVID-19 diagnosis.)
Tracey Mann	KS-1	✓	✓
Hal Rogers	KY-5	✓	✓
Garret Graves	LA-6	✗	✓
Clay Higgins	LA-3	✓	✓
Mike Johnson	LA-4	✓	✓
Steve Scalise	LA-1	✓	✓
Andy Harris	MD-1	✓	✓
Jack Bergman	MI-1	✓	✓
Lisa McClain	MI-10	✓	✓
Tim Walberg	MI-7	✓	✓
Michelle Fischbach	MN-7	✓	✓
Jim Hagedorn	MN-1	✓	✓
Michael Guest	MS-3	✓	✓
Trent Kelly	MS-1	✓	✓
Steven Palazzo	MS-4	✓	✓
Sam Graves	MO-6	✓	✓
Vicky Hartzler	MO-4	✓	✓
Billy Long	MO-7	✓	✓
Blaine Luetkemeyer	MO-3	✓	✓
Jason Smith	MO-8	✓	✓
Matt Rosendale	MT-AL	✓	✓
Adrian Smith	NE-3	✓	✓
Dan Bishop	NC-9	✓	✓
Ted Budd	NC-13	✓	✓
Madison Cawthorn	NC-11	✓	✓
Virginia Foxx	NC-5	✗	✓
Richard Hudson	NC-8	✓	✓
Greg Murphy	NC-3	✗	✓
David Rouzer	NC-7	✓	✓
Jeff Van Drew	NJ-2	✓	✓
Yvette Herrell	NM-2	✓	✓
Chris Jacobs	NY-27	✓	✓
Nicole Malliotakis	NY-11	✓	✓
Elise Stefanik	NY-21	✗	✓
Lee Zeldin	NY-1	✓	✓
Steve Chabot	OH-1	✗	✓
Warren Davidson	OH-8	✓	✓
Bob Gibbs	OH-7	✓	✓
Bill Johnson	OH-6	✓	✓
Jim Jordan	OH-4	✓	✓
Stephanie Bice	OK-5	✓	✓
Tom Cole	OK-4	✓	✓
Kevin Hern	OK-1	✓	✓
Frank Lucas	OK-3	✓	✓
Markwayne Mullin	OK-2	✓	✓
Cliff Bentz	OR-2	✗	✓
John Joyce	PA-13	✓	✓
Fred Keller	PA-12	✗	✓
Mike Kelly	PA-16	✓	✓
Daniel Meuser	PA-9	✗	✓
Scott Perry	PA-10	✓	✓
Guy Reschenthaler	PA-14	✓	✓
Lloyd Smucker	PA-11	✗	✓
Glenn Thompson	PA-15	✗	✓
Jeff Duncan	SC-3	✓	✓
Ralph Norman	SC-5	✓	✓
Tom Rice	SC-7	✓	✓
William Timmons	SC-4	✓	✓
Joe Wilson	SC-2	✓	✓
Tim Burchett	TN-2	✓	✓
Scott DesJarlais	TN-4	✓	✓
Chuck Fleischmann	TN-3	✓	✓
Mark E. Green	TN-7	✓	✓
Diana Harshbarger	TN-1	✓	✓
David Kustoff	TN-8	✗	✓
John Rose	TN-6	✓	✓
Jodey Arrington	TX-19	✓	✓
Brian Babin	TX-36	✓	✓
Michael C. Burgess	TX-26	✓	✓
John Carter	TX-31	✓	✓
Michael Cloud	TX-27	✓	✓
Pat Fallon	TX-4	✓	✓
Louie Gohmert	TX-1	✓	✓
Lance Gooden	TX-5	✓	✓
Ronny Jackson	TX-13	✓	✓
Troy Nehls	TX-22	✓	✓
August Pfluger	TX-11	✓	✓
Pete Sessions	TX-17	✓	✓
Beth Van Duyne	TX-24	✗	✓
Randy Weber	TX-14	✓	✓
Roger Williams	TX-25	✓	✓
Ron Wright	TX-6	✓	✓
Burgess Owens	UT-4	✗	✓
Chris Stewart	UT-2	✗	✓
Ben Cline	VA-6	✓	✓
Bob Good	VA-5	✓	✓
Morgan Griffith	VA-9	✓	✓
Robert J. Wittman	VA-1	✗	✓
Carol Miller	WV-3	✓	✓
Alexander Mooney	WV-2	✗	✓
Scott L. Fitzgerald	WI-5	✓	✓
Tom Tiffany	WI-7	✓	✓

== See also ==
- Attempts to overturn the 2020 United States presidential election
- Freedom Caucus
- Republican efforts to restrict voting following the 2020 presidential election
- Republican reactions to Donald Trump's claims of 2020 election fraud
- United States House Select Committee on the January 6 Attack public hearings
