= 2026 Kansas elections =

United States elections

- November 3, 2026

A general election was held in the state of Kansas on November 3, 2026. Primary elections were held on August 7, 2026. The elections are part of the 2026 United States elections.

== United States Congress ==
=== United States Senate ===
An election to the Class II United States Senate seat will take place. Republican incumbent Roger Marshall is seeking re-election to a second term. Marshall is being challenged by Democratic pastor Adam Hamilton. Marshall was first elected to the seat in 2020 with 53.2% of the vote.

=== United States House of Representatives ===
Elections for the four representatives will take place, one from each of the state's congressional districts. Prior to the election, three of the state's representative were Republicans, while one was a Democrat. In each seat, the incumbent is running for re-election.

== State offices ==
=== Governor and Lieutenant Governor ===
An election for the next Governor and Lieutenant Governor will take place. Incumbent Democratic governor Laura Kelly is term-limited and ineligible to seek a third consecutive term. The Republican ticket consists of Ty Masterson, incumbent president of the State Senate, and his running mate, state senator Jeff Klemp. The Democratic ticket consists of state senator Cindy Holscher and her running mate, state representative KC Ohaebosim. In the 2022 election, Kelly won the election with 49.54% of the vote.

=== Attorney General ===
An election will be held to elect the Kansas attorney general. Republican incumbent Kris Kobach is seeking election to a second term. Kobach is being challenged by Democratic lawyer Chris Mann. The election is a rematch of the 2022 election, when Kobach won 50.80% of the vote to Mann's 49.20%.

=== Secretary of State ===
An election for the Secretary of State of Kansas. Incumbent Republican Scott Schwab retired to run for governor, but was eliminated in the primary. Republican state representatieve Pat Proctor is facing Democratic former state representative Jennifer Day. Scott Morgan is running as a third party candidate under the United Kansas label. In the 2022 election, Schwab won the election with 58.36% of the vote.

=== State Treasurer ===
Incumbent Republican State Treasurer Steven Johnson is being challenged by Democratic businessman Juan Luengo. Johnson won the 2022 election with 54.03% of the vote.

=== Insurance Commissioner ===
Incumbent Republican Insurance Commissioner Vicki Schmidt retired to run for governor, but was eliminated in the primary. Republican Speaker of the State House of Representatives Daniel Hawkins is facing Democratic minority leader of the State Senate Dinah Sykes. In the prior election in 2022, Schmidt received the highest percentage of the vote of any statewide candidate with 63.1% of the vote.

=== State House of Representatives ===
Voters will elect members of the Kansas House of Representatives in all 125 of the U.S. state of Kansas's legislative districts to serve a two-year term. Prior to the election, Republicans held 88 of the seats in the chamber to Democrats' 37 seats.

== Ballot measures ==
=== Elections for Supreme Court Justices Amendment ===
A legislatively referred constitutional amendment was put before voters to approve a change to the State's constitution to mandate justices of the State's Supreme Court would be elected by voters. A vote against the proposed amendment would maintain the system where justices are appointed by the Governor of Kansas through recommendations by the Kansas Supreme Court Nominating Commission. The proposed amendment was rejected by voters during the August 7, 2026, primary election.

Kansas Elections for Supreme Court Justices Amendment
Choice	Votes	%
For	243,915	38.60
Against	387,951	61.40
Total	631,866	100.00
Source: Secretary of State of Kansas

=== Citizenship Voting Requirement Amendment ===
A legislatively referred constitutional amendment to clarify that only United States citizens may vote in state elections, and require that voters must be eighteen years old and reside in the area in which they seek to vote. The State's Constitution already prohibits non-citizens from voting in elections. The ballot measure will appear on the November 3, 2026, ballot.
