= 2026 Kansas State Treasurer election =

- November 3, 2026

Nominee	Steven Johnson	Juan Luengo	Eric Lund
Party	Republican	Democratic	Libertarian
Popular vote	553,683	478,668	49,017
Percentage	51.2%	44.3%	4.5%
State Treasurer before election
Steven Johnson
Republican
Elected State Treasurer
Steven Johnson
Republican

The 2026 Kansas State Treasurer election was held on November 3, 2026, to elect the Treasurer of Kansas, concurrently with elections to the United States Senate, U.S. House of Representatives, governor, and other state and local elections. Primary elections were held on August 4, 2026.

== Republican primary ==
=== Candidates ===
==== Nominee ====
- Steven Johnson, incumbent state treasurer (2023–present)

=== Results ===
Republican primary results
Party	Candidate	Votes	%
Republican	Steven Johnson (incumbent)	275,638	100.0
Total votes		275,638	100.0

== Democratic primary ==
=== Candidates ===
==== Nominee ====
- Juan Luengo, businessman

=== Results ===
Democratic primary results
Party	Candidate	Votes	%
Democratic	Juan Luengo	193,763	100.0
Total votes		193,763	100.0

== Third-party and independent candidates ==
=== Declared ===
- Eric Lund (Libertarian), financial auditor

== General election ==
=== Results ===
2026 Kansas State Treasurer election results
Party	Candidate	Votes	%	±%
Republican	Steven Johnson (incumbent)	553,683	51.2	−2.8
Democratic	Juan Luengo	478,668	44.3	+2.9
Libertarian	Eric Lund	49,017	4.5	−0.1
Total votes		1,081,368	100.0	
