= David Toland =

American politician (born 1977)

- Official portrait, 2025

52nd Lieutenant Governor of Kansas
- Incumbent
- Assumed office January 2, 2021
- Governor: Laura Kelly
- Preceded by: Lynn Rogers

Secretary of Commerce of Kansas
- Incumbent
- Assumed office January 14, 2019
- Governor: Laura Kelly
- Preceded by: Robert North

Personal details
- Born: May 27, 1977 (age 49)
- Party: Democratic
- Children: 2
- Education: University of Kansas (BA, MPA)

David C. Toland (born May 27, 1977) is an American politician and businessman concurrently serving as the 52nd lieutenant governor of Kansas and Kansas secretary of commerce.

== Early life and education ==
A seventh-generation Kansas native, Toland was raised in Iola, Kansas. Toland earned a Bachelor of Arts degree in political science and Master of Public Administration from the University of Kansas.

== Career ==
Toland had previously worked for the Government of the District of Columbia in the Office of Planning and Economic Development, a real estate services company, and most recently served as president and CEO of a community health-improvement and economic development organization based in Iola, Kansas.

=== Kansas secretary of commerce ===
On January 11, 2019, Governor Laura Kelly announced that she would appoint Toland as Kansas Secretary of Commerce following her inauguration on January 14, 2019. Toland was confirmed to the position by the Kansas Senate on April 1, 2019, by a vote of 23–14. He received support from all 11 Democratic senators, 11 Republicans, and the Senate's lone independent.

Following his confirmation, Toland oversaw the reestablishment of the state's International Division at the Department. Toland also assisted in negotiations with the state of Missouri to end the incentives "Border War" in the bi-state Kansas City region. Toland also oversaw the restoration of the Kansas Main Street Program at the Department's newly established Community Development division.

Throughout 2020, Toland and the Department of Commerce worked on the expansion of a Schwan's Company facility in Salina, the successful recruitment of a $400 million Urban Outfitters distribution center in Wyandotte County, and two new Amazon distribution centers in Park City and Kansas City. In 2020, the Department of Commerce's economic development teams recruited more than $2.5 billion in capital investment, the highest level of new capital investment in the state's history. Kansas was awarded Area Development Magazine's Gold Shovel Award, as well as being declared the state with the best business climate in the West North Central United States by Site Selection Magazine.

=== Lieutenant governor of Kansas ===
On December 14, 2020, Governor Laura Kelly announced that Toland would serve as the lieutenant governor of Kansas after Lynn Rogers assumed the office as Treasurer of Kansas on January 2, 2021. Toland continues to serve as Secretary of Commerce and as lieutenant governor.

== Personal life ==
Toland and his wife have two children.

Political offices
Preceded by Robert North	Secretary of Commerce of Kansas; 2019–present	Incumbent
Preceded by Lynn Rogers	Lieutenant Governor of Kansas; 2021–present	Incumbent
Party political offices
Preceded by Lynn Rogers	Democratic nominee for Lieutenant Governor of Kansas; 2022	Succeeded by KC Ohaebosim
