= 2020 United States Senate election in Kansas =

- November 3, 2020

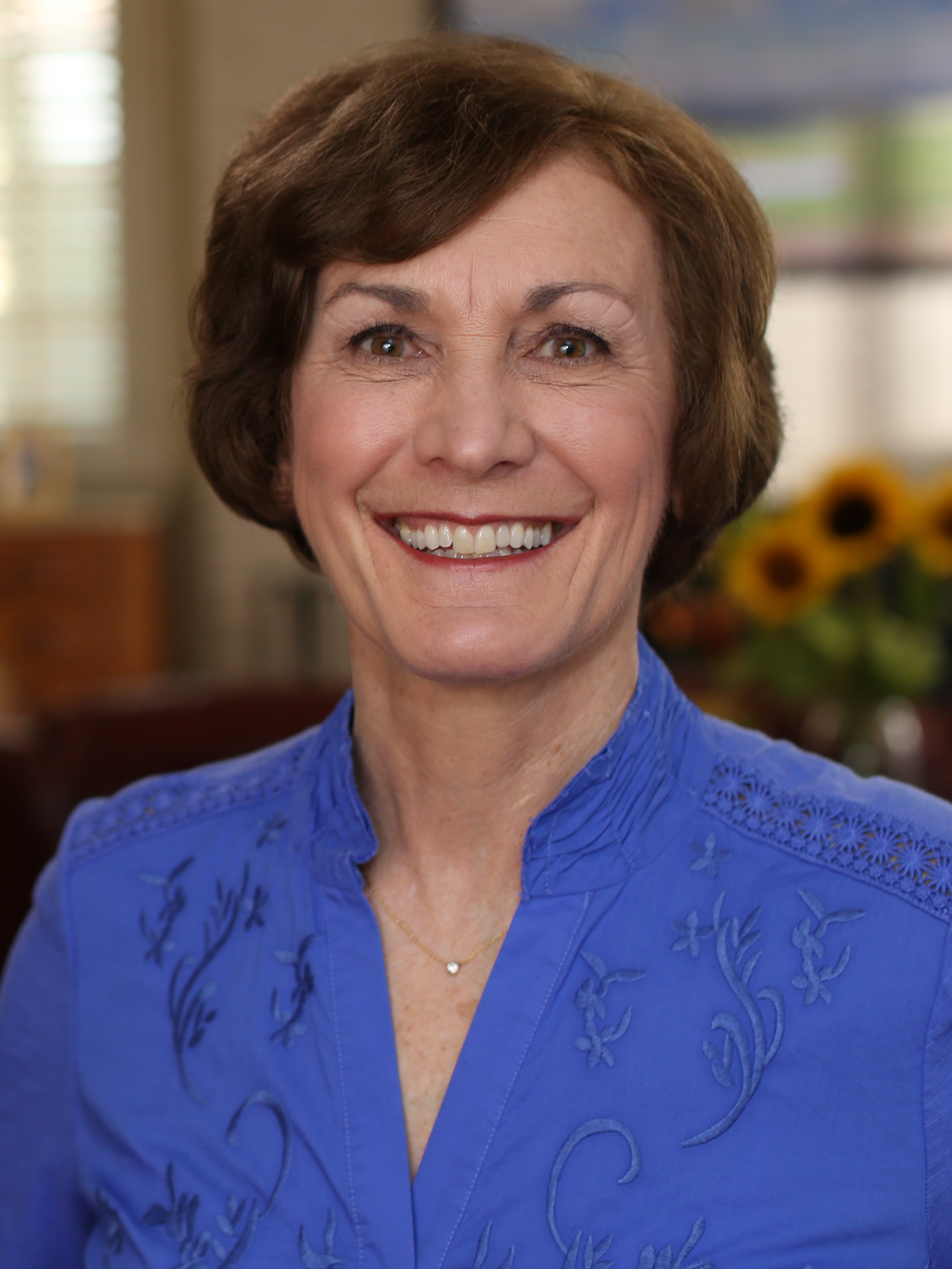
Nominee	Roger Marshall	Barbara Bollier
Party	Republican	Democratic
Popular vote	727,962	571,530
Percentage	53.22%	41.79%
- Marshall: 40–50% 50–60% 60–70% 70–80% 80–90% >90% Bollier: 40–50% 50–60% 60–70% 70–80% 80–90% >90% Tie: 40–50% 50% No data
U.S. senator before election
Pat Roberts
Republican
Elected U.S. Senator
Roger Marshall
Republican

The 2020 United States Senate election in Kansas was held on November 3, 2020, to elect a member of the United States Senate to represent the State of Kansas, concurrently with the 2020 U.S. presidential election, other elections to the United States Senate, elections to the United States House of Representatives, and various state and local elections.

On January 4, 2019, incumbent Republican Senator Pat Roberts announced he would not run for a fifth term. Candidates had until June 1, 2020 to file to run for the open seat, or to drop out if they had already filed. The U.S. Senate primaries were held on August 4, 2020.

Republican U.S. Representative Roger Marshall was considered a narrow favorite based on polling, but he won by around 11 points, a larger margin than most experts predicted. However, this was the first Senate election since 1978 where a Democrat won Shawnee County, the first Senate election since 1974 where a Democrat won Riley County, and the first Senate election ever in Kansas's history where a Democrat won Johnson County; all three counties were also flipped by Democrat Joe Biden in the concurrent presidential election.

== Republican primary ==
=== Candidates ===
==== Nominee ====
- Roger Marshall, incumbent U.S. representative for Kansas's 1st congressional district

==== Eliminated in primary ====
- Lance Berland
- John L. Berman, engineer
- Derek Ellis, quality assurance technician
- Bob Hamilton, businessman
- Kris Kobach, former secretary of state of Kansas and Republican nominee for governor of Kansas in 2018
- Dave Lindstrom, board chairman for the Kansas Turnpike Authority, former Kansas City Chiefs player, Republican nominee for lieutenant governor of Kansas in 2002
- Brian Matlock, economics graduate student
- John Miller
- Steve Roberts, member of the Kansas Board of Education
- Gabriel Mark Robles

==== Withdrawn ====
- Jake LaTurner, Kansas State Treasurer (running for U.S. House in District 2)
- Bryan Pruitt, conservative commentator
- Susan Wagle, president of the Kansas Senate

==== Declined ====
- Alan Cobb, president of the Kansas Chamber of Commerce
- Jeff Colyer, former governor of Kansas and lieutenant governor of Kansas (endorsed Roger Marshall)
- Ron Estes, incumbent U.S. representative for Kansas's 4th congressional district and former Kansas State Treasurer (running for reelection)
- Wink Hartman, oilman and restaurant owner, nominee for lieutenant governor of Kansas in 2018
- Ajit Pai, chairman of the Federal Communications Commission
- Mike Pompeo, United States secretary of state, former director of the Central Intelligence Agency, and former U.S. representative for Kansas's 4th congressional district
- Pat Roberts, incumbent U.S. senator (endorsed Roger Marshall)
- Matt Schlapp, incumbent chairman of the American Conservative Union and former director of the Office of Political Affairs
- Derek Schmidt, Kansas attorney general
- Scott Schwab, Kansas secretary of state

==== Primary debate ====
In a live-streamed debate on May 22, 2020, in a ballroom empty of spectators due to the COVID-19 pandemic, all five major candidates praised president Donald Trump. Kobach took on his opponents who all agreed that he could not win the general election against presumptive Democratic nominee, Bollier. Marshall said, "We cannot afford to send a failed candidate back this fall who will lose to Barbara Bollier and hand the Senate majority over to Chuck Schumer." "Instead, we need to send a tried and trusted friend of President Trump." Referring to Marshall, Kobach replied, "Do you want a go-along-to-get-along kind of senator, a gutless wonder who never takes a stand, or, do you want someone who poses a threat?" Hamilton said voters didn't have to choose between Kobach, who couldn't win, and a moderate Marshall, in whose behest the state party leaders had urged Senator Wagle and Lindstrom, to drop out of the race. Objecting to the party pressure, Lindstrom characterized his opponents as "shortsighted, self-serving ... career politicians who are divisive, controversial," and, "have a record of losing elections." Wagle touted her own candidacy, saying, "It's very, very important that we send a leader to the U.S. Senate who is articulate, who is persuasive, who other people respect. ... I'm the one who's already debated Barbara Bollier. ... I win on the Senate floor. I've beat (sic) her numerous times ... the conservative voice that can beat that liberal voice in the U.S. Senate," she said. In response to a claim that he would not prioritize the issue of agriculture, Marshall said, "Fake news and another lie by Kris Kobach."

=== Endorsements ===
Kris Kobach

Organizations

- America First Media
- Gun Owners of America
- Kansas Operation Rescue
- National Association for Gun Rights
- National Border Patrol Council
- Open Up Kansas Coalition

Individuals

- David Barton, former Texas Republican Party vice chair
- Ann Coulter, Fox News correspondent, conservative commentator and lawyer
- James Dobson, Focus on the Family founder
- Peter Thiel, entrepreneur and venture capitalist
Roger Marshall

Federal officials

- Bob Dole, 1996 Republican presidential nominee, former U.S. senator from Kansas (1969–1996), former Senate majority leader (1985–1987, 1995–1996), 1976 Republican vice presidential nominee, former U.S. representative (KS-06, 1961–1963; KS-01, 1963–1969)
- Newt Gingrich, former speaker of the United States House of Representatives and former U.S. representative (GA-06, 1979–1999)

Organizations

- Family Policy Alliance of Kansas
- Family Research Council (FRC) Action
- Kansans for Life (KFL) PAC
- Kansas Farm Bureau
- Kansas Livestock Association
- National Right to Life Committee
- U.S. Chamber of Commerce

=== Polling ===
Poll source	Date(s) administered	Sample size (Note: Key: A – all adults RV – registered voters LV – likely voters V – unclear)	Margin of error	Bob Hamilton	Kris Kobach	Dave Lindstrom	Roger Marshall	Susan Wagle	Other	Undecided
Civiqs/Daily Kos	May 30 – June 1, 2020	419 (LV)	–	15%	35%	4%	26%	–	4% (Note: "someone else" with 4%)	16%
	May 28, 2020	Wagle withdraws from the race								
Public Opinion Strategies (R) (Note: Poll conducted for the Marshall campaign.)	May 10–12, 2020	600 (V)	± 4%	6%	26%	4%	33%	7%	–	24%
	March 30, 2020	Hamilton announces his candidacy								
McLaughlin & Associates (R) (Note: This poll was sponsored by Kris Kobach's campaign)	February 12–16, 2020	300 (LV)	± 5.6%	2%	40%	5%	23%	8%	–	21%
co/efficient (R)	January 19–20, 2020	1,246 LV	± 3.2%	–	29%	–	29%	6%	9% (Note: "Someone else" with 9%)	28%
The Tarrance Group (R) (Note: This poll was conducted by the National Republican Senatorial Committee.)	October 21–23, 2019	607 (LV)	± 4.1%	–	43%	3%	24%	8%	5% (Note: Hartman with 5%)	16%

Hypothetical polling

with only Kris Kobach and Roger Marshall

Poll source	Date(s) administered	Sample size	Margin of error	Kris Kobach	Roger Marshall
Public Opinion Strategies (R)	May 10–12, 2020	600 (V)	± 4%	34%	48%

with only Bob Hamilton, Kris Kobach and Roger Marshall

Poll source	Date(s) administered	Sample size	Margin of error	Bob Hamilton	Kris Kobach	Roger Marshall
Public Opinion Strategies (R)	May 10–12, 2020	600 (V)	± 4%	10%	29%	41%

with Mike Pompeo and Susan Wagle

Poll source	Date(s) administered	Sample size	Margin of error	Kris Kobach	Roger Marshall	Mike Pompeo	Other	Undecided
NRSC	October 21–23, 2019	607 (LV)	± 4.1%	17%	11%	54%	7% (Note: Wagle with 4%; Hartman with 2%; Lindstrom with 1%)	10%

with only Kris Kobach and Mike Pompeo

Poll source	Date(s) administered	Sample size	Margin of error	Kris Kobach	Mike Pompeo
NRSC	October 21–23, 2019	607 (LV)	± 4.1%	24%	68%

=== Results ===
Primary results by county Marshall: 30–40%; 40–50%; 50–60%; 60–70%; Kobach: 30–40%; 40–50%; Hamilton: 30–40%; 40–50%; 50–60%

Republican primary results
Party	Candidate	Votes	%
Republican	Roger Marshall	167,800	40.28%
Republican	Kris Kobach	108,726	26.10%
Republican	Bob Hamilton	77,952	18.71%
Republican	Dave Lindstrom	27,451	6.59%
Republican	Steve Roberts	8,141	1.95%
Republican	Brian Matlock	7,083	1.70%
Republican	Lance Berland	6,404	1.54%
Republican	John Miller	4,431	1.06%
Republican	Derek Ellis	3,970	0.95%
Republican	Gabriel Robles	3,744	0.90%
Republican	John Berman	861	0.21%
Total votes		416,563	100.00%

== Democratic primary ==
=== Candidates ===
==== Nominee ====
- Barbara Bollier, physician and state senator

==== Eliminated in primary ====
- Robert Tillman, Kansas National Guard veteran and perennial candidate

==== Withdrawn ====
- Elliot Adams, database developer
- Nancy Boyda, former U.S. representative from Kansas's 2nd congressional district (endorsed Bollier)
- Corbie Crow, certified public accountant
- Barry Grissom, former United States attorney for the District of Kansas (endorsed Bollier)
- Usha Reddi, mayor of Manhattan
- Adam Smith

==== Declined ====
- Paul Davis, former minority leader of the Kansas House of Representatives, nominee for governor in 2014 and KS-02 in 2018
- Kathleen Sebelius, former secretary of health and human services, former governor of Kansas, and former Kansas insurance commissioner
- Sarah Smarsh, author
- Josh Svaty, former Kansas secretary of agriculture, former state representative, and candidate for governor of Kansas in 2018
- Brent Welder, candidate for Kansas's 3rd congressional district in 2018

=== Endorsements ===
Barbara Bollier

U.S. senators

- Chuck Schumer, U.S. senator (NY) and Senate minority leader

Federal officials

- Nancy Boyda, former U.S. representative (KS-02)

State politicians

- Kathleen Sebelius, former governor (2003–2009), former U.S. secretary of health and human services (2009–2014)

Former U.S. executive branch officials

- Barry Grissom, former U.S. attorney for Kansas (2010–2016)

State legislators

- Stacey Abrams, former Georgia House of Representatives minority leader (2011–2017) and Democratic nominee in 2018 Georgia gubernatorial election

Organizations

- DSCC
- Emily's List
- End Citizens United
- Feminist Majority PAC
- Giffords
- Human Rights Campaign
- League of Conservation Voters
- NARAL Pro-Choice America
- Planned Parenthood
- Sierra Club
- Women's Political Committee

=== Results ===
Primary results by county Bollier: 60–70%; 70–80%; 80–90%; 90–100%; Tillman: 50–60%

Democratic primary results
Party	Candidate	Votes	%
Democratic	Barbara Bollier	168,759	85.34%
Democratic	Robert Tillman	28,997	14.66%
Total votes		197,756	100.00%

== Other candidates ==
=== Libertarian Party ===
==== Nominee ====
- Jason Buckley, U.S. Navy veteran

=== Independents ===
==== Withdrawn ====
- Paul Tuten

== General election ==
=== Post-primary endorsements ===
Roger Marshall (R)

Federal officials

- Sheila Frahm, former lieutenant governor of Kansas (1995–1996) and former U.S. senator from Kansas (1996)
Barbara Bollier (D)

Federal officials

- Kirsten Gillibrand, U.S. senator (NY)
- Nancy Kassebaum, former U.S. senator (KS) (Republican)

State and local officials

- Barbara Allen, former Kansas state senator (Republican)
- Pat Colloton, former Kansas state representative (Republican)
- Linda Gallagher, former Kansas state representative (Republican)
- Laura Kelly, governor of Kansas (2019–present)
- Jan Kessinger, Kansas state representative (Republican)
- Audrey Langworthy, former Kansas state senator (Republican)
- Patty Markley, former Kansas state representative (Republican)
- Tim Owens, former Kansas state senator (Republican)
- Jill Quigley, former Kansas state representative (Republican)
- Gary Sherrer, former lieutenant governor of Kansas (1996–2003) (Republican)
- John Skubal, Kansas state senator (Republican)
- Sheryl Spalding, former Kansas state representative (Republican)
- John Vratil, former Kansas state senator and former Senate vice president (Republican)
- Ron Worley, former Kansas state representative (Republican)
- Jim Yonally, former Kansas state representative (Republican)

Organizations

- 314 Action
- Brady Campaign
- Council for a Livable World
- Everytown for Gun Safety
- Natural Resources Defense Council Action Fund
- Rachel's Action Network

Unions

- AFL–CIO Kansas
- National Education Association
- United Auto Workers

Newspapers and publications

- The Kansas City Star
- The Wichita Eagle

=== Predictions ===
Source	Ranking	As of
The Cook Political Report	Lean R	October 29, 2020
Inside Elections	Tilt R	October 28, 2020
Sabato's Crystal Ball	Lean R	November 2, 2020
Daily Kos	Lean R	October 30, 2020
Politico	Lean R	November 2, 2020
RCP	Lean R	October 23, 2020
DDHQ	Lean R	November 3, 2020
538	Likely R	November 2, 2020
Economist	Lean R	November 2, 2020

=== Polling ===
View source data.

Poll source	Date(s) administered	Sample size	Margin of error	Roger Marshall (R)	Barbara Bollier (D)	Jason Buckley (L)	Other	Undecided
Data For Progress (D)	October 27 – November 1, 2020	1,121 (LV)	± 2.9%	51%	45%	4%	1% (Note: "Other candidate/write-in" with 1%)	–
VCreek/AMG	October 25–27, 2020	1,149 (LV)	± 3.8%	47%	43%	2%	–	8%
GBAO Strategies (D) (Note: Archived November 2, 2020, at the Wayback Machine) (Note: Poll sponsored by Bollier's campaign.)	October 25–27, 2020	600 (LV)	± 4%	45% (Note: Standard VI response)	46%	4%	4% (Note: Includes Undecided)	–
GBAO Strategies (D)	October 25–27, 2020	600 (LV)	± 4%	47% (Note: If Bollier and Marshall were the only candidates)	47%	–	–	–
Public Policy Polling (D) (Note: Poll sponsored by Protect Our Care, a pro-Affordable Care Act organization.)	October 19–20, 2020	897 (V)	± 3.3%	43%	43%	5%	–	9%
Siena College/NYT Upshot	October 18–20, 2020	755 (LV)	± 4%	46%	42%	4%	2% (Note: "Someone else" and would not vote with 1%)	6% (Note: Includes "Refused")
co/efficient (R) (Note: Poll sponsored by Keep Kansas Great PAC, which has endorsed Marshall prior to this poll's sampling period.)	October 18–20, 2020	2,453 (LV)	± 3.7%	51%	39%	2%	–	8%
VCreek/AMG (R)	September 29–30, 2020	3,104 (LV)	± 1.75%	42%	45%	2%	–	11%
Civiqs/Daily Kos	September 26–29, 2020	677 (LV)	± 4.5%	50%	43%	–	2% (Note: "Someone else" with 2%)	5%
GBAO Strategies (D)	September 24–27, 2020	600 (LV)	± 4%	43%	45%	7%	–	–
Data For Progress (D)	September 14–19, 2020	883 (LV)	± 3.3%	40%	40%	5%	–	15%
Data For Progress (D)	September 14–19, 2020	883 (LV)	± 3.3%	42%	42%	–	–	15%
co/efficient (R)	September 15–16, 2020	794 (LV)	± 3.5%	43%	39%	2%	–	16%
SurveyUSA	August 8–9, 2020	1,202 (LV)	± 3.3%	46%	44%	–	–	10%
Public Policy Polling (D) (Note: Poll for EMILY's List, a Democratic PAC which seeks to elect pro-choice Democratic women to office)	August 5–6, 2020	864 (V)	± 3.3%	43%	42%	–	–	15%
Civiqs/Daily Kos	May 30 – June 1, 2020	699 (RV)	± 4.2%	42%	41%	–	9%	8%
NMB Research (R)	May 17–19, 2020	506 (LV)	± 4.5%	46%	35%	–	–	18%
Public Policy Polling (D)	March 10–11, 2020	1,567 (V)	± 2.5%	47%	37%	–	–	–

Hypothetical polling

Bob Hamilton vs. Barbara Bollier

Poll source	Date(s) administered	Sample size	Margin of error	Bob Hamilton (R)	Barbara Bollier (D)	Other	Undecided
Civiqs/Daily Kos	May 30 – June 1, 2020	699 (RV)	± 4.2%	40%	41%	11% (Note: "Someone else" with 11%)	8%

Kris Kobach vs. Barbara Bollier

Poll source	Date(s) administered	Sample size	Margin of error	Kris Kobach (R)	Barbara Bollier (D)	Other	Undecided
Civiqs/Daily Kos	May 30 – June 1, 2020	699 (RV)	± 4.2%	41%	42%	11%	7%
NMB Research/NRSC (R)	May 17–19, 2020	506 (LV)	± 4.5%	44%	43%	–	12%
Public Policy Polling (D) (Note: Poll sponsored by 314 Action)	April 13–14, 2020	1,271 (RV)	± 2.7%	42%	44%	–	13%
McLaughlin & Associates (R)	February 12–13, 2020	300 (LV)	± 5.6%	47%	38%	–	15%
DFM Research (Note: The SMART Transportation Division is an AFL-CIO affiliated PAC promoting employee assistance programs for retired railroad, bus, and mass transit workers)	January 30 – February 6, 2020	600 (A)	± 4.0%	43%	43%	4%	10%

Kris Kobach vs. Barry Grissom

Poll source	Date(s) administered	Sample size	Margin of error	Kris Kobach (R)	Barry Grissom (D)	Undecided
Tarrance Group/NRSC (R)	June 9–11, 2019	600 (LV)	± 4%	42% (Note: Figures for other Republicans tested against Grissom in this poll have not been released, but all others led him by at least 8%)	52%	–

Generic Republican vs. Generic Democrat

Poll source	Date(s) administered	Sample size	Margin of error	Generic Republican (R)	Generic Democrat (D)	Undecided
co/efficient/Keep Kansas Great PAC (Note: Keep Kansas Great PAC endorsed Marshall prior to this poll's sampling period)	September 15–16, 2020	794 (LV)	± 3.5%	53%	39%	–
Public Policy Polling (D)	April 13–14, 2020	1,271 (RV)	± 2.7%	50%	40%	11%
DFM Research/SMART Transportation Division	January 30 – February 6, 2020	600 (A)	± 4.0%	39%	31%	30%
Tarrance Group/NRSC (R)	June 9–11, 2019	600 (LV)	± 4.0%	44%	36%	–

=== Results ===
On the night of the election, Roger Marshall was announced as the winner of the Senate race.

United States Senate election in Kansas, 2020
Party	Candidate	Votes	%	±%
Republican	Roger Marshall	727,962	53.22%	+0.07%
Democratic	Barbara Bollier	571,530	41.79%	N/A
Libertarian	Jason Buckley	68,263	4.99%	+0.67%
Total votes		1,367,755	100.0%	
Republican hold				

==== By county ====
County	Roger Marshall Republican		Barbara Bollier Democratic		Jason Buckley Libertarian		Margin		Total
County	#	%	#	%	#	%	#	%	Total
Allen	3,856	65.7%	1,701	29.0%	314	5.3%	2,155	36.7%	5,871
Anderson	2,638	70.4%	842	22.5%	268	7.2%	1,796	47.9%	3,748
Atchison	4,454	60.0%	2,434	32.8%	531	7.2%	2,020	27.2%	7,419
Barber	1,879	80.9%	328	14.1%	115	5.0%	1,551	66.8%	2,322
Barton	8,151	73.6%	2,477	22.4%	451	4.1%	5,674	51.2%	11,079
Bourbon	4,619	69.6%	1,694	25.5%	319	4.8%	2,925	44.1%	6,632
Brown	2,975	67.1%	1,193	26.9%	267	6.0%	1,782	41.2%	4,435
Butler	21,312	65.7%	9,554	29.4%	1,584	4.9%	11,758	36.3%	32,450
Chase	1,025	68.9%	390	26.2%	73	4.9%	635	42.7%	1,488
Chautauqua	1,345	82.9%	225	13.9%	53	3.3%	1,120	69.0%	1,623
Cherokee	6,216	68.6%	2,368	26.2%	471	5.2%	3,848	42.4%	9,055
Cheyenne	1,168	79.2%	241	16.4%	65	4.4%	927	62.8%	1,474
Clark	831	78.8%	164	15.5%	60	5.7%	667	63.3%	1,055
Clay	2,991	71.9%	932	22.4%	235	5.7%	2,059	49.5%	4,158
Cloud	3,018	71.6%	942	22.4%	254	6.0%	2,076	49.2%	4,214
Coffey	3,228	71.2%	1,027	22.7%	276	6.1%	2,201	48.5%	4,531
Comanche	716	77.9%	153	16.6%	50	5.4%	563	51.3%	919
Cowley	8,886	62.2%	4,458	32.0%	821	5.8%	4,318	30.2%	14,275
Crawford	9,092	54.9%	6,494	39.2%	978	5.9%	2,598	15.7%	16,564
Decatur	1,180	79.2%	232	15.6%	78	5.2%	948	63.6%	1,490
Dickinson	6,553	70.6%	2,235	24.1%	492	5.3%	4,318	46.5%	9,280
Doniphan	2,761	75.8%	672	18.5%	209	5.7%	2,089	47.3%	3,642
Douglas	16,594	27.9%	40,262	67.7%	2,623	4.4%	-23,668	-39.8%	59,479
Edwards	1,094	76.8%	267	18.8%	63	4.4%	827	58.0%	1,424
Elk	1,041	77.3%	230	17.1%	75	5.6%	811	60.2%	1,346
Ellis	9,298	67.5%	3,904	28.3%	569	4.1%	5,394	39.2%	13,771
Ellsworth	1,992	69.9%	715	25.1%	142	5.0%	1,277	44.8%	2,849
Finney	6,808	58.2%	4,242	36.3%	646	5.5%	2,566	21.9%	11,696
Ford	5,415	61.3%	2,950	33.4%	472	5.3%	2,465	27.9%	8,837
Franklin	7,814	63.1%	3,705	29.9%	868	7.0%	4,109	33.2%	12,387
Geary	4,878	51.2%	3,962	41.6%	682	7.2%	916	9.6%	9,522
Gove	1,197	82.2%	210	14.4%	50	3.4%	987	67.8%	1,457
Graham	1,012	76.3%	256	19.3%	58	4.4%	756	57.0%	1,326
Grant	1,803	72.8%	531	21.5%	141	5.7%	1,272	51.3%	2,475
Gray	1,811	79.4%	355	15.6%	114	5.0%	1,456	63.8%	2,280
Greeley	503	80.4%	97	15.5%	26	4.2%	406	64.9%	626
Greenwood	2,217	72.3%	654	21.3%	194	6.3%	1,563	51.0%	3,065
Hamilton	655	76.9%	156	18.3%	41	4.8%	499	58.6%	852
Harper	1,972	74.6%	546	20.7%	125	4.7%	1,426	53.9%	2,643
Harvey	9,542	55.3%	6,942	40.2%	780	4.5%	2,600	15.1%	17,264
Haskell	1,051	74.7%	285	20.3%	71	5.0%	766	54.4%	1,407
Hodgeman	826	79.4%	179	17.2%	35	3.4%	647	62.2%	1,040
Jackson	4,130	62.9%	2,029	30.9%	411	6.3%	2,101	32.0%	6,570
Jefferson	5,902	60.3%	3,349	34.2%	536	5.5%	2,553	26.1%	9,787
Jewell	1,310	81.2%	239	14.8%	65	4.0%	1,071	66.4%	1,614
Johnson	152,068	43.8%	179,231	51.6%	16,037	4.6%	-27,163	-7.8%	347,336
Kearny	1,104	77.0%	278	19.4%	51	3.6%	826	57.6%	1,433
Kingman	2,902	73.6%	846	21.5%	195	4.9%	2,056	52.1%	3,943
Kiowa	938	80.6%	157	13.5%	69	5.9%	781	67.1%	1,164
Labette	5,282	62.0%	2,806	33.0%	427	5.0%	2,476	29.0%	8,515
Lane	706	79.4%	135	15.2%	48	5.4%	571	64.2%	889
Leavenworth	20,067	55.2%	13,894	38.2%	2,396	6.6%	6,173	17.0%	36,357
Lincoln	1,208	76.9%	297	18.9%	66	4.2%	911	58.0%	1,571
Linn	3,682	73.4%	996	19.9%	335	6.7%	2,686	53.5%	5,013
Logan	1,163	80.3%	218	15.0%	68	4.7%	945	65.3%	1,449
Lyon	6,951	49.9%	6,171	44.3%	806	5.8%	780	5.6%	13,928
Marion	4,258	69.6%	1,597	26.1%	260	4.3%	2,661	43.5%	6,115
Marshall	3,422	67.9%	1,325	26.3%	294	5.8%	2,097	41.6%	5,041
McPherson	9,406	65.4%	4,370	30.4%	609	4.2%	5,036	35.0%	14,385
Meade	1,434	79.4%	290	16.0%	83	4.6%	1,144	63.4%	1,807
Miami	11,629	65.0%	5,428	30.3%	828	4.6%	6,201	34.7%	17,885
Mitchell	2,392	77.4%	587	19.0%	111	3.6%	1,805	58.4%	3,090
Montgomery	9,456	70.9%	3,234	24.3%	640	4.8%	6,222	46.6%	13,330
Morris	1,924	66.6%	839	29.0%	127	4.4%	1,085	47.6%	2,890
Morton	964	81.4%	167	14.1%	53	4.5%	797	67.3%	1,184
Nemaha	4,391	77.4%	1,060	18.7%	220	3.9%	3,331	58.7%	5,671
Neosho	4,566	67.0%	1,938	28.4%	315	4.6%	2,628	38.6%	6,819
Ness	1,273	84.8%	171	11.4%	58	3.9%	1,102	73.4%	1,502
Norton	1,910	79.6%	379	15.8%	110	4.6%	1,531	63.8%	2,399
Osage	5,177	64.9%	2,292	28.7%	508	6.4%	2,885	36.2%	7,977
Osborne	1,503	77.7%	333	17.2%	99	5.1%	1,170	60.5%	1,935
Ottawa	2,442	76.6%	566	17.7%	182	5.7%	1,876	58.9%	3,190
Pawnee	1,932	70.8%	683	25.0%	115	4.2%	1,249	45.8%	2,730
Phillips	2,261	81.7%	370	13.4%	136	4.9%	1,891	68.3%	2,767
Pottawatomie	9,010	68.9%	3,425	26.2%	637	4.9%	5,585	42.7%	13,072
Pratt	2,925	70.9%	1,012	24.5%	187	4.5%	1,913	46.4%	4,124
Rawlins	1,204	80.5%	227	15.2%	64	4.3%	977	65.3%	1,495
Reno	17,362	62.2%	9,251	33.1%	1,307	4.7%	8,111	29.1%	27,920
Republic	2,092	79.4%	433	16.4%	111	4.2%	1,659	63.0%	2,636
Rice	3,039	70.7%	1,047	24.4%	213	5.0%	1,992	46.3%	4,299
Riley	11,323	44.9%	12,767	50.6%	1,149	4.6%	-1,444	-5.7%	25,239
Rooks	2,190	80.0%	382	14.0%	166	6.1%	1,808	66.0%	2,738
Rush	1,275	76.4%	316	18.9%	77	4.6%	959	57.5%	1,668
Russell	2,595	75.7%	666	19.4%	167	4.9%	1,929	56.3%	3,428
Saline	14,666	60.0%	8,671	35.4%	1,125	4.6%	5,995	24.6%	24,462
Scott	1,918	81.7%	325	13.8%	105	4.5%	1,593	67.9%	2,348
Sedgwick	115,476	52.0%	96,205	43.3%	10,496	4.7%	19,271	8.7%	222,177
Seward	3,115	59.9%	1,824	35.1%	260	5.0%	1,291	24.8%	5,199
Shawnee	37,861	44.3%	43,185	50.5%	4,510	5.3%	-5,324	-6.2%	85,556
Sheridan	1,222	85.2%	173	12.1%	40	2.8%	1,049	73.1%	1,435
Sherman	2,132	78.8%	418	15.5%	155	5.7%	1,714	63.3%	2,705
Smith	1,668	78.6%	366	17.2%	88	4.1%	1,302	61.4%	2,122
Stafford	1,561	77.0%	380	18.8%	85	4.2%	1,181	58.2%	2,026
Stanton	598	78.4%	140	18.3%	25	3.3%	458	60.1%	763
Stevens	1,641	81.8%	270	13.5%	96	4.8%	1,371	68.3%	2,007
Sumner	7,458	68.3%	2,835	26.0%	619	5.7%	4,623	42.3%	10,912
Thomas	2,965	78.0%	688	18.1%	146	3.8%	2,277	59.9%	3,799
Trego	1,240	76.6%	296	18.3%	82	5.1%	944	58.3%	1,618
Wabaunsee	2,670	68.7%	1,034	26.6%	181	4.7%	1,636	42.1%	3,885
Wallace	738	90.2%	54	6.6%	26	3.2%	684	83.6%	818
Washington	2,260	78.5%	507	17.6%	111	3.9%	1,753	60.9%	2,878
Wichita	774	80.5%	154	16.0%	33	3.4%	620	64.5%	961
Wilson	2,910	73.6%	853	21.6%	190	4.8%	2,057	52.0%	3,953
Woodson	1,093	71.0%	352	22.9%	94	6.1%	741	48.1%	1,539
Wyandotte	16,811	29.9%	35,685	63.5%	3,721	6.6%	-18,874	-33.6%	56,217
Totals	727,962	53.2%	571,530	41.8%	68,263	5.0%	156,432	11.4%	1,367,755

Counties that flipped from Independent to Democratic

- Douglas (largest city: Lawrence)
- Shawnee (largest city: Topeka)
- Wyandotte (largest city: Kansas City)

Counties that flipped from Republican to Democratic

- Johnson (largest city: Overland Park)
- Riley (largest city: Manhattan)

==== By congressional district ====
Marshall won three of four congressional districts.

District	Marshall	Bollier	Representative
1st	66%	29%	Roger Marshall
1st	66%	29%	Tracey Mann
2nd	52%	42%	Steve Watkins
2nd	52%	42%	Jake LaTurner
3rd	42%	53%	Sharice Davids
4th	56%	39%	Ron Estes

== Notes ==
Partisan clients

== See also ==
- 2020 Kansas elections
- List of United States senators from Kansas
