= Brett Hildabrand =

American politician (born 1981)

Member of the Kansas House of Representatives from the 17th district
- In office January 14, 2013 – January 9, 2017
- Preceded by: Kelly Meigs
- Succeeded by: Tom Cox

Member of the Kansas House of Representatives from the 23rd district
- In office January 10, 2011 – January 14, 2013
- Preceded by: Milack Talia
- Succeeded by: Kelly Meigs

Personal details
- Born: March 3, 1981 (age 45) Fort Scott, Kansas
- Party: Republican
- Website: www.brett4kansas.com

Brett Hildabrand (March 3, 1981) was a Republican member of the Kansas House of Representatives representing the 17th District which includes Lake Quivira, Lenexa and Shawnee Kansas. Hildabrand's first term began in January 2011. In 2004, he earned a B.S. in Animal Science from Kansas State University. He currently works in the freight logistics and transportation field.

== Issue positions ==
On his website Hildabrand lists his legislative goals as "Job Growth and Small Business Development, Protection of Personal Liberties and Freedoms, Reducing State Spending, Quality Education, Defending the Second Amendment and Protecting the Right to Life."

== Committee membership ==
- Federal and State Affairs Committee
- Corrections and Juvenile Justice
- Transportation & Public Safety Budget, Vice-chair
