= 2021 United States Electoral College vote count =

Last step of 2020 presidential election

- January 6–7, 2021

538 members of the Electoral College 270 electoral votes needed to win

Nominee	Joe Biden	Donald Trump
Party	Democratic	Republican
Home state	Delaware	Florida
Running mate	Kamala Harris	Mike Pence
Electoral vote	306	232
States carried	25 + DC + NE-02	25 + ME-02
- Objections made to the electoral college votes of the 2020 U.S. presidential election. No objections Objection(s) attempted (Note: Pursuant to the Electoral Count Act of 1887, an objection requires the assent of a Representative and a Senator in order to be sustained before Congress. In all these cases, the attempted objections failed to receive assent from a Senator.) Objections defeated
President before election
Donald Trump
Republican
Elected President
Joe Biden
Democratic

The count of the Electoral College ballots during a joint session of the 117th United States Congress, pursuant to the Electoral Count Act, on January 6–7, 2021, was held as the final step to confirm then president-elect Joe Biden's victory in the 2020 presidential election over incumbent president Donald Trump.

The event drew unprecedented attention because of the efforts of Trump and his allies to overturn the election results. A group of legislators from Trump's Republican Party announced they would formally object to counting Biden's votes in swing states, while Trump unsuccessfully sought to have Vice President Mike Pence use his presiding role over the count to change the outcome. The joint session adjourned twice to debate objections against the votes won by Biden in Arizona and Pennsylvania; both objections were defeated in the House and Senate, with only six Republican senators supporting the former and seven supporting the latter. Republican representatives also raised objections against votes for Biden from Georgia, Michigan, Nevada, and Wisconsin, but these objections failed because they were not co-signed by a senator.

Amid the debate on Arizona's votes, rioters stormed the Capitol building, causing the count to be temporarily halted until officials could safely return to their chambers. The counting resumed in the evening after the Capitol was secured and concluded by the following morning.

Pence was the first incumbent vice president since Al Gore in 2001 to have presided over an electoral vote count in which they were a losing candidate for the election.

== Background ==
=== Electoral College ===
The United States Electoral College is the group of presidential electors required by the Constitution to form every four years for the sole purpose of electing the president and vice president. Each state appoints electors according to its legislature, equal in number to its congressional delegation (senators and representatives). Federal office holders cannot be electors. Of the current 538 electors, an absolute majority of 270 or more electoral votes is required to elect the president and vice president. As stated in the Twelfth Amendment to the United States Constitution, if no candidate for either office achieves an absolute majority there, a contingent election is held by the United States House of Representatives to elect the president, and by the United States Senate to elect the vice president; under this amendment, only the election of 1824 failed to produce a majority for president, and the election of 1836 for vice president.

Each state and the District of Columbia produces two documents to be forwarded to Congress, a certificate of ascertainment and a certificate of vote. A certificate of ascertainment is an official document that identifies the state's appointed College electors and the tally of the final popular vote count for each candidate in that state in a presidential election; the certificate of ascertainment is submitted after an election by the governor of each state to the archivist of the United States and others, in accordance with 3 U.S.C. §§ 6–14 and the Electoral Count Act. Within the United States' electoral system, the certificates "[represent] a crucial link between the popular vote and votes cast by electors". The certificates must bear the state seal and the governor's signature. Staff from the Office of the Federal Register ensure that each certificate contains all legally required information. When each state's appointed electors meet to vote (on the first Monday after the second Wednesday of December), they sign and record their vote on a certificate of vote, which are then paired with the certificate of ascertainment, which together are sent to be opened and counted by Congress.

The 12th Amendment mandates Congress assemble in joint session to count the electoral votes and declare the winners of the election. The Electoral Count Act, a federal law enacted in 1887, further established specific procedures for the counting of the electoral votes by the joint Congress. The session is ordinarily required to take place on January 6 in the calendar year immediately following the meetings of the presidential electors. Since the 20th Amendment, the newly elected joint Congress declares the winner of the election; all elections before 1936 were determined by the outgoing Congress.

A state's certificate of vote can be rejected only if both houses of Congress, debating separately, vote to accept an objection by a majority in each House. If the objection is approved by both Houses, the state's votes are not included in the count. Individual votes can also be objected to, and are also not counted. If there are no objections or all objections are overruled, the presiding officer simply includes a state's votes, as declared in the certificate of vote, in the official tally. After the certificates from all states are read and the respective votes are counted, the presiding officer simply announces the final state of the vote. This announcement concludes the joint session and formalizes the recognition of the president-elect and of the vice president-elect. The senators then depart from the House chamber. The final tally is printed in the Senate and House journals.

=== Attempts to thwart the electoral college ===
President Trump, his campaign, and his supporters engaged in numerous attempts to overturn the results of the 2020 United States presidential election.

==== Proposal for the military to decide the winner ====
On December 18, 2020, a team of Trump allies including Ret. Lt. General Michael Flynn, attorney Sidney Powell, Patrick M. Byrne, Emily Newman, and others met the president in the White House and urged him to issue a drafted executive order, "Presidential Findings to Preserve Collect and Analyze National Security Information Regarding the 2020 General Election." According to the draft order, the military would seize voting machines; the Trump White House would delay the transition to the Biden administration while Director of National Intelligence John Ratcliffe and the Defense Department decided whether the election had been fair; and Trump would appoint a special counsel to prosecute those involved in the election. Powell additionally proposed that Trump appoint her to the last position.

==== Pressure on Vice President Pence to obstruct the certification of electoral votes ====
On December 28, 2020, Republican U.S. representative Louis Gohmert of Texas and the slate of Republican presidential electors for Arizona filed a lawsuit in the U.S. District Court for the Eastern District of Texas against Vice President Mike Pence, seeking to force him to decide the election outcome. Gohmert argued that the Electoral Count Act of 1887 was unconstitutional, that the Constitution gave Vice President Pence the "sole" power to decide the election outcome, and that Pence had the power to "count elector votes certified by a state's executive", select "a competing slate of duly qualified electors," or "ignore all electors from a certain state." On January 1, 2021, U.S. district judge Jeremy Kernodle dismissed the suit for lack of standing. The next day, the U.S. Court of Appeals for the Fifth Circuit affirmed the dismissal of Gohmert's suit in a unanimous decision by a three-judge panel.

President Trump had repeatedly raised with his vice president the notion he could delay or obstruct the Electoral College vote count set to occur in Congress on January 6 and was "confused" on why Vice President Pence could not unilaterally reject electoral votes and overturn the results of the election. Trump had argued that Pence, instead of simply acting in his constitutionally prescribed role, could delay the count beyond January 6 and ultimately force the question of who won the election to either the House of Representatives or the Supreme Court. However, on January 5, Pence told Trump that he did not have the authority to block counting of votes for President-elect Joe Biden's win in the joint session of Congress to count electoral votes. On July 5, 2023, in the lead up to the 2024 Iowa Republican presidential caucuses, Pence responded to questions from an Iowa woman about his Constitutional authority saying that "The Constitution affords no authority—to the vice president or anyone else—to reject votes or return votes to the states."

==== Fake electors sent by the Trump campaign in seven states ====
Another proposed method was to reject results in Pennsylvania, Georgia, Michigan, Arizona, Wisconsin, Nevada and New Mexico by alleging that these states had sent competing sets of electors. If the results from those seven states had been rejected, neither candidate would have had the 270 votes required in the Electoral College, and the House would have had to decide the election.

This strategy, including the drafting of fake documents for the supposedly competing electors, was coordinated by Rudy Giuliani in December 2020. Boris Epshteyn acknowledged being involved. Attorney John Eastman mentioned it in a January 4 meeting with Trump and Pence.

In reality, the states only sent one set of electors each. The Trump campaign sent its own supposedly competing electors and backed them by forged documents. While real state certificates tend to have "their own quirks, their own fancy or not fancy paper and decorations and seals," the Republicans' fake documents had the "same formatting, same font, same spacing, almost the same exact wording, all of them," as MSNBC commentator Rachel Maddow noted.

In Pennsylvania and Nevada, the documents explicitly admitted that these "electors in waiting" were not the state's official electors and were only being proposed as alternate electors pending the outcome of Trump's election lawsuits. In the other five states, however, the documents falsely identified the Trump allies as the official state electors. As of January 2022, the Justice Department is investigating the matter. The 59 people who presented themselves as fake electors could face federal and state charges.

=== Announcements of planned Electoral College vote count objections ===
In December 2020, several Republican members of the House led by Representative Mo Brooks of Alabama, as well as Republican senator Josh Hawley of Missouri, declared that they would formally object to the counting of the electoral votes of five swing states won by Biden during the January 6, 2021, joint session. The objections would then trigger votes from both houses. In December Brooks organized three White House meetings between Trump, Republican lawmakers, and others, including Vice President Pence and members of Trump's legal team. As Brooks confirmed at the time, the purpose of the meetings was to strategize about how Congress could overturn the election results on January 6.

The last time an objection was successfully filed was after the 2004 presidential election, when Senator Barbara Boxer of California joined Representative Stephanie Tubbs Jones of Ohio in filing a congressional objection to the certification of Ohio's Electoral College votes due to alleged irregularities. The Senate voted the objection down 1–74; the House voted the objection down 31–267.

At least 140 House Republicans reportedly planned to vote against the 2020 counting of electoral votes, despite the lack of any credible allegation of an irregularity that would have affected the election, and the allegations' rejections by courts, election officials, the Electoral College, and others, and despite the fact that almost all of the Republican objectors had "just won elections in the very same balloting they are now claiming was fraudulently administered."

Senate majority leader Mitch McConnell, who on December 15 acknowledged Biden's victory the day after the Electoral College vote, privately urged his Republican Senate colleagues not to join efforts by some House Republicans to challenge the vote count, but was unable to persuade Hawley not to lodge an objection. Hawley used his objection stance in fundraising emails. Twelve additional Republican senators and senators-elect (Ted Cruz, Ron Johnson, James Lankford, Steve Daines, John Kennedy, Marsha Blackburn, Mike Braun, Cynthia Lummis, Roger Marshall, Bill Hagerty, Tommy Tuberville, and Kelly Loeffler) eventually announced that they would join Hawley's challenge, while acknowledging that it would not succeed.

On January 2, 2021, Vice President Pence expressed support for the attempt to overturn Biden's victory. Neither Pence nor the senators planning to object made any specific allegation of fraud; rather, they vaguely suggested that some wrongdoing might have taken place. Other Senate Republicans were noncommittal or opposed to the attempt to subvert the election results.

==== Reactions ====
A spokesperson for President-elect Biden called the proposed objection effort a publicity stunt that would fail, a statement echoed by Senator Amy Klobuchar, the top Democrat of the committee with jurisdiction over federal elections. A bipartisan group of senators condemned the scheme to undo the election for Trump; Joe Manchin (D-WV), Susan Collins (R-ME), Mark Warner (D-VA), Bill Cassidy (R-LA), Jeanne Shaheen (D-NH), Lisa Murkowski (R-AK), Angus King (I-ME), Mitt Romney (R-UT), and Maggie Hassan (D-NH) said, "The 2020 election is over. All challenges through recounts and appeals have been exhausted. At this point, further attempts to cast doubt on the legitimacy of the 2020 presidential election are contrary to the clearly expressed will of the American people and only serve to undermine Americans' confidence in the already determined election results." In a separate statement, Senator Ben Sasse, Republican of Nebraska, denounced his Republican colleagues who have sought to overturn the election results, terming them "the institutional arsonist members of Congress" and the submission of objection to counting the electoral votes as a "dangerous ploy" by Republican members of Congress who, in seeking "a quick way to tap into the president's populist base", were pointing "a loaded gun at the heart of legitimate self-government." Other prominent Republicans who spoke out against attempts to subvert the election results included Maryland governor Larry Hogan, former House speaker Paul Ryan, and Representative Liz Cheney of Wyoming, the third-highest-ranking Republican in the House.

Objections to the electoral votes had virtually no chance of success, as Democrats had a majority in the House of Representatives. Although the Senate had a Republican majority, there was no committed majority for overturning the election results. Trevor Potter, a Republican former chairman of the Federal Election Commission and the president of the Campaign Legal Center, wrote that the counting joint session "gives Trump's die-hard supporters in Congress an opportunity to again provide more disinformation about the election on national television." After Senator John Thune, the second highest-ranking Senate Republican, said that the challenge to the election results would fail "like a shot dog" in the Senate, Trump attacked him on Twitter.

In December, Trump repeatedly encouraged his supporters to protest in Washington, D.C., on January 6 in support of his campaign to overturn the election results, appealing his supporters to "Be there, will be wild!" The Washington Post editorial board criticized Trump for urging street protests, referring to previous violence by some Trump supporters at two earlier rallies and his earlier statement during a presidential debate telling the Proud Boys to "stand back and stand by." Multiple groups of "die-hard" Trump supporters planned rallies in D.C. on that day: Women for America First; the Eighty Percent Coalition (also at Freedom Plaza); the group's name refers to the approximately 80% of Trump voters who do not accept the legitimacy of Biden's win); and "The Silent Majority" (a group organized by a South Carolina conservative activist). George Papadopoulos and Roger Stone, ardent allies of Trump, planned to headline some of the events. In addition to the formally organized events, the Proud Boys, other far-right groups, and white supremacists vowed to descend on Washington on January 6, with some threatening violence and pledging to carry weapons. Proud Boys leader Enrique Tarrio said that his followers would "be incognito" and "spread across downtown DC in smaller teams." On January 4, Tarrio was arrested by D.C. police on misdemeanor and felony charges.

On January 10, a number of companies (including the financial company Morgan Stanley and the hotel chain Marriott, which each have their own PAC) announced they would cease their political contributions to members of Congress who had voted against certifying the Electoral College results.

== Joint session of Congress ==
Counting of Electoral College votes 2021, part 1

Counting of Electoral College votes 2021, part 2

Counting of Electoral College votes 2021, part 3

A joint session of Congress convened at 1:00 PM EST on January 6, 2021, presided over by Vice President Pence, where the votes of the state electors were formally certified in the House chamber. Prior to the vote, Pence released a letter to Congress which denied the assertion that Pence, as the presiding officer of the count, had "unilateral authority" to overturn any state results. (See also Gohmert v. Pence.)

The results from each state were opened and read one at a time, in alphabetical order. The results of Alabama and Alaska were read without objection. The results of Arizona were then objected to by Paul Gosar (AZ-4) and Ted Cruz (TX). Because of the objection, the joint session adjourned at 1:15 p.m. to allow each chamber to debate and vote on the objection.

During the debate of Arizona's votes, Trump supporters stormed the U.S. Capitol at approximately 2:15 p.m. and members of the House of Representatives and Senate were promptly evacuated from the Capitol by Capitol Police, and Congress was placed under lockdown. The District of Columbia National Guard, as well as the National Guards and state police of the neighboring states of Virginia and Maryland, were activated within the hour. At approximately 5:40 p.m., the sergeant-at-arms announced that the Capitol building had been secured. Congress then reconvened at 8:00 p.m. and politicians from both parties condemned both Trump and the rioters' failed insurrection.

Before the session resumed, at 7:00 p.m. Trump's lawyer, Rudy Giuliani, left a voice message to Senator Mike Lee by mistake, as the intended recipient was Senator Tommy Tuberville. Lee subsequently released the message to the public. In the message, Giuliani is heard saying: "I know they're reconvening at 8 tonight, but it ... the only strategy we can follow is to object to numerous states and raise issues so that we get ourselves into tomorrow – ideally until the end of tomorrow." The legal or tactical purpose of the attempted delay is not clear; but may have been to form the basis of another legal challenge if the certification could not have been finalized on the 6th. Senator Tuberville was not aware of the message intended for him until after it became public.

Senate rejects Arizona objection 93–6. Session 8:00 p.m. Jan 6th

Speech by Rep. Adam Kinzinger in the House opposing objection to Pennsylvania's votes after the rioting in the Capitol

Debate on the objection to Arizona's electoral votes resumed at 8:00 p.m., and both chambers spent some time condemning the storming of the Capitol. The Senate then voted to reject the objection by 6–93 at 10:10 p.m., and was followed by the House rejection by 121–303 at 11:08 p.m. The joint session resumed again shortly afterwards where Pence requested the secretary of the Senate and the clerk of the House to report the actions of both, with the written objection being formally rejected, allowing the session to resume for the rest of the states. Objections to the electoral votes of Georgia, Michigan, and Nevada were raised by Republican members of the House, but were not sustained because no senator joined the objection. In the case of Georgia, Senator Kelly Loeffler (R–GA) had withdrawn her objection after the unrest. After the failed objection to Michigan's electoral votes, the outstanding planned objections for Nevada, Pennsylvania, and Wisconsin totaling 36 votes were not sufficient to deny the Biden/Harris ticket the 270 votes needed to win. Representative Jake LaTurner was notified of his positive diagnosis with COVID after the vote on Arizona and went into isolation, missing the Pennsylvania vote.

The next state objected to was Pennsylvania where Scott Perry (PA-10) and Josh Hawley (MO) objected to the results, and the joint session adjourned at 12:15 a.m. The Senate held no further debate and within minutes the Senate rejected the objection by a 7–92 vote. The House held a debate where there was a single instance of disruption during a speech by Conor Lamb (PA-17). An objection by Morgan Griffith (VA-9) to Lamb's words was denied over timeliness, during which Andy Harris (MD-1) and Colin Allred (TX-32) argued with each other, causing a disruption. Their confrontation was broken up, after which Lamb resumed his speech. After further debate, the House voted to reject the objection at 3:08 a.m. by a 138–282 vote.

Across the objections for Arizona and Pennsylvania, a total of 147 Republicans in Congress—eight senators and 139 representatives—voted to sustain one or both objections.

The joint session resumed once again at 3:25 a.m., with the secretary and the clerk reporting the results of the vote, formally rejecting the second written objection. The session resumed the tallying of the results. At 3:33 a.m., the electoral votes of Vermont were counted, putting the Biden/Harris ticket over the 270 electoral votes needed to secure the presidency and vice presidency. The final objection was to Wisconsin, but it failed because no senator joined the objection. The joint session was dissolved by Pence at 3:44 a.m.

Republican representative Peter Meijer said that several of his Republican colleagues in the House would have voted to certify the votes, but did not out of fear for the safety of their families, and that at least one specifically voted to overturn Biden's victory against their conscience because they were shaken by the mob attack that day.

State	EV	EV winners	Objection				
State	EV	EV winners	Raised by		Vote		Outcome
State	EV	EV winners	House	Senate	House	Senate	Outcome
Alabama	9	Trump/Pence	None		—N/a		No objection
Alaska	3	Trump/Pence	None		—N/a		No objection
Arizona	11	Biden/Harris	Paul Gosar (R–AZ-4)	Ted Cruz (R–TX)	121–303	6–93	Objection defeated
Arkansas	6	Trump/Pence	None		—N/a		No objection
California	55	Biden/Harris	None		—N/a		No objection
Colorado	9	Biden/Harris	None		—N/a		No objection
Connecticut	7	Biden/Harris	None		—N/a		No objection
Delaware	3	Biden/Harris	None		—N/a		No objection
District of Columbia	3	Biden/Harris	None		—N/a		No objection
Florida	29	Trump/Pence	None		—N/a		No objection
Georgia	16	Biden/Harris	Jody Hice (R–GA-10)	None (Note: Georgia Senator Kelly Loeffler had planned on objecting to the Georgia electors, but withdrew her objection following the storming of the United States Capitol that occurred earlier in the day.)	—N/a		Objection not debated
Hawaii	4	Biden/Harris	None		—N/a		No objection
Idaho	4	Trump/Pence	None		—N/a		No objection
Illinois	20	Biden/Harris	None		—N/a		No objection
Indiana	11	Trump/Pence	None		—N/a		No objection
Iowa	6	Trump/Pence	None		—N/a		No objection
Kansas	6	Trump/Pence	None		—N/a		No objection
Kentucky	8	Trump/Pence	None		—N/a		No objection
Louisiana	8	Trump/Pence	None		—N/a		No objection
Maine	4	3 for Biden/Harris; 1 for Trump/Pence (Note: Electoral votes for Maine and Nebraska are allocated between statewide vote and congressional districts.)	None		—N/a		No objection
Maryland	10	Biden/Harris	None		—N/a		No objection
Massachusetts	11	Biden/Harris	None		—N/a		No objection
Michigan	16	Biden/Harris	Marjorie Taylor Greene (R–GA-14)	None	—N/a		Objection not debated
Minnesota	10	Biden/Harris	None		—N/a		No objection
Mississippi	6	Trump/Pence	None		—N/a		No objection
Missouri	10	Trump/Pence	None		—N/a		No objection
Montana	3	Trump/Pence	None		—N/a		No objection
Nebraska	5	4 for Trump/Pence; 1 for Biden/Harris	None		—N/a		No objection
Nevada	6	Biden/Harris	Mo Brooks (R–AL-5)	None	—N/a		Objection not debated
New Hampshire	4	Biden/Harris	None		—N/a		No objection
New Jersey	14	Biden/Harris	None		—N/a		No objection
New Mexico	5	Biden/Harris	None		—N/a		No objection
New York	29	Biden/Harris	None		—N/a		No objection
North Carolina	15	Trump/Pence	None		—N/a		No objection
North Dakota	3	Trump/Pence	None		—N/a		No objection
Ohio	18	Trump/Pence	None		—N/a		No objection
Oklahoma	7	Trump/Pence	None		—N/a		No objection
Oregon	7	Biden/Harris	None		—N/a		No objection
Pennsylvania	20	Biden/Harris	Scott Perry (R–PA-10)	Josh Hawley (R–MO)	138–282	7–92	Objection defeated
Rhode Island	4	Biden/Harris	None		—N/a		No objection
South Carolina	9	Trump/Pence	None		—N/a		No objection
South Dakota	3	Trump/Pence	None		—N/a		No objection
Tennessee	11	Trump/Pence	None		—N/a		No objection
Texas	38	Trump/Pence	None		—N/a		No objection
Utah	6	Trump/Pence	None		—N/a		No objection
Vermont (Note: With Vermont's 3 electoral votes, Joe Biden and Kamala Harris surpassed the 270 electoral vote threshold, securing victory in the electoral vote count. This occurred at approximately 3:33 a.m. Eastern Time.)	3	Biden/Harris	None		—N/a		No objection
Virginia	13	Biden/Harris	None		—N/a		No objection
Washington	12	Biden/Harris	None		—N/a		No objection
West Virginia	5	Trump/Pence	None		—N/a		No objection
Wisconsin	10	Biden/Harris	Louie Gohmert (R–TX-1)	None	—N/a		Objection not debated
Wyoming	3	Trump/Pence	None		—N/a		No objection

=== Arizona ===
Nay: 303 seats Not voting/not present: 9 seats (7 not voting, 2 not present) Yea: 121 seats Not shown: 2 seats

House of Representatives"On agreeing to the objection"
Party	Votes for	Votes against	Not voting	Not present
Democratic (222)	–	220	2: Alcee Hastings (FL–20); Rashida Tlaib (MI–13)	–
Republican (211) (Note: 209 out of 211 Republican representatives—431 of 433 representatives total—were present. Two Republican U.S. Representatives, María Elvira Salazar (FL–27) and David Valadao (CA–21), were not present due to contracting and being diagnosed with COVID-19. Additionally, two seats later seated by Republicans, Louisiana's 5th congressional district and New York's 22nd congressional district, were vacant, meaning only 433 members were seated.)	121	83	5: Gus Bilirakis (FL–12); Kevin Brady (TX–8); Kay Granger (TX–12); Young Kim (CA–39); Michelle Steel (CA–48)	2: María Elvira Salazar (FL–27); David Valadao (CA–21)
Total (433)	121	303	7	2

Republicans voting for the objection (121)
- Robert Aderholt (AL–4)
- Rick W. Allen (GA–12)
- Jodey Arrington (TX–19)
- Brian Babin (TX–36)
- Jim Baird (IN–4)
- Jim Banks (IN–3)
- Jack Bergman (MI–1)
- Stephanie Bice (OK–5)
- Andy Biggs (AZ–5)
- Dan Bishop (NC–9)
- Lauren Boebert (CO–3)
- Mike Bost (IL–12)
- Mo Brooks (AL–5)
- Ted Budd (NC–13)
- Tim Burchett (TN–2)
- Michael C. Burgess (TX–26)
- Ken Calvert (CA–42)
- Kat Cammack (FL–3)
- Jerry Carl (AL–1)
- Buddy Carter (GA–1)
- John Carter (TX–31)
- Madison Cawthorn (NC–11)
- Ben Cline (VA–6)
- Michael Cloud (TX–27)
- Andrew Clyde (GA–9)
- Tom Cole (OK–4)
- Rick Crawford (AR–1)
- Warren Davidson (OH–8)
- Scott DesJarlais (TN–4)
- Mario Díaz-Balart (FL–25)
- Byron Donalds (FL–19)
- Jeff Duncan (SC–3)
- Neal Dunn (FL–2)
- Ron Estes (KS–4)
- Pat Fallon (TX–4)
- Michelle Fischbach (MN–7)
- Scott L. Fitzgerald (WI–5)
- Chuck Fleischmann (TN–3)
- Scott Franklin (FL–15)
- Russ Fulcher (ID–1)
- Matt Gaetz (FL–1)
- Mike Garcia (CA–25)
- Bob Gibbs (OH–7)
- Carlos A. Giménez (FL–26)
- Louie Gohmert (TX–1)
- Bob Good (VA–5)
- Lance Gooden (TX–5)
- Paul Gosar (AZ–4)
- Sam Graves (MO–6)
- Mark E. Green (TN–7)
- Marjorie Taylor Greene (GA–14)
- Morgan Griffith (VA–9)
- Michael Guest (MS–3)
- Jim Hagedorn (MN–1)
- Andy Harris (MD–1)
- Diana Harshbarger (TN–1)
- Vicky Hartzler (MO–4)
- Kevin Hern (OK–1)
- Yvette Herrell (NM–2)
- Jody Hice (GA–10)
- Clay Higgins (LA–3)
- Richard Hudson (NC–8)
- Darrell Issa (CA–50)
- Ronny Jackson (TX–13)
- Chris Jacobs (NY–27)
- Mike Johnson (LA–4)
- Bill Johnson (OH–6)
- Jim Jordan (OH–4)
- John Joyce (PA–13)
- Trent Kelly (MS–1)
- Mike Kelly (PA–16)
- Doug LaMalfa (CA–1)
- Doug Lamborn (CO–5)
- Jake LaTurner (KS–2)
- Debbie Lesko (AZ–8)
- Billy Long (MO–7)
- Barry Loudermilk (GA–11)
- Frank Lucas (OK–3)
- Blaine Luetkemeyer (MO–3)
- Nicole Malliotakis (NY–11)
- Tracey Mann (KS–1)
- Brian Mast (FL–18)
- Kevin McCarthy (CA–23)
- Lisa McClain (MI–10)
- Mary Miller (IL–15)
- Carol Miller (WV–3)
- Barry Moore (AL–2)
- Markwayne Mullin (OK–2)
- Troy Nehls (TX–22)
- Ralph Norman (SC–5)
- Devin Nunes (CA–22)
- Jay Obernolte (CA–8)
- Steven Palazzo (MS–4)
- Gary Palmer (AL–6)
- Scott Perry (PA–10)
- August Pfluger (TX–11)
- Bill Posey (FL–8)
- Guy Reschenthaler (PA–14)
- Tom Rice (SC–7)
- Hal Rogers (KY–5)
- Mike Rogers (AL–3)
- John Rose (TN–6)
- Matt Rosendale (MT–AL)
- David Rouzer (NC–7)
- John Rutherford (FL–4)
- Steve Scalise (LA–1)
- Pete Sessions (TX–17)
- Jason Smith (MO–8)
- Adrian Smith (NE–3)
- Greg Steube (FL–17)
- Tom Tiffany (WI–7)
- William Timmons (SC–4)
- Jeff Van Drew (NJ–2)
- Tim Walberg (MI–7)
- Jackie Walorski (IN–2)
- Randy Weber (TX–14)
- Daniel Webster (FL–11)
- Roger Williams (TX–25)
- Joe Wilson (SC–2)
- Ron Wright (TX–6)
- Lee Zeldin (NY–1)
Republicans voting against the objection (83)
- Mark Amodei (NV–2)
- Kelly Armstrong (ND–AL)
- Don Bacon (NE–2)
- Troy Balderson (OH–12)
- Andy Barr (KY–6)
- Cliff Bentz (OR–2)
- Vern Buchanan (FL–16)
- Ken Buck (CO–4)
- Larry Bucshon (IN–8)
- Steve Chabot (OH–1)
- Liz Cheney (WY–AL)
- James Comer (KY–1)
- Dan Crenshaw (TX–2)
- John Curtis (UT–3)
- Rodney Davis (IL–13)
- Tom Emmer (MN–6)
- Randy Feenstra (IA–4)
- Drew Ferguson (GA–3)
- Brian Fitzpatrick (PA–1)
- Jeff Fortenberry (NE–1)
- Virginia Foxx (NC–5)
- Mike Gallagher (WI–8)
- Andrew Garbarino (NY–2)
- Tony Gonzales (TX–23)
- Anthony Gonzalez (OH–16)
- Garret Graves (LA–6)
- Glenn Grothman (WI–6)
- Brett Guthrie (KY–2)
- Jaime Herrera Beutler (WA–3)
- French Hill (AR–2)
- Ashley Hinson (IA–1)
- Trey Hollingsworth (IN–9)
- Bill Huizenga (MI–2)
- Dusty Johnson (SD–AL)
- David Joyce (OH–14)
- John Katko (NY–24)
- Fred Keller (PA–12)
- Adam Kinzinger (IL–16)
- David Kustoff (TN–8)
- Darin LaHood (IL–18)
- Bob Latta (OH–5)
- Nancy Mace (SC–1)
- Thomas Massie (KY–4)
- Michael McCaul (TX–10)
- Tom McClintock (CA–4)
- Patrick McHenry (NC–10)
- David McKinley (WV–1)
- Peter Meijer (MI–3)
- Dan Meuser (PA–9)
- Mariannette Miller-Meeks (IA–2)
- John Moolenaar (MI–4)
- Alex Mooney (WV–2)
- Blake Moore (UT–1)
- Greg Murphy (NC–3)
- Dan Newhouse (WA–4)
- Burgess Owens (UT–4)
- Greg Pence (IN–6)
- Tom Reed (NY–23)
- Cathy McMorris Rodgers (WA–5)
- Chip Roy (TX–21)
- David Schweikert (AZ–6)
- Austin Scott (GA–8)
- Mike Simpson (ID–2)
- Chris Smith (NJ–4)
- Lloyd Smucker (PA–11)
- Victoria Spartz (IN–5)
- Pete Stauber (MN–8)
- Elise Stefanik (NY–21)
- Bryan Steil (WI–1)
- Chris Stewart (UT–2)
- Steve Stivers (OH–15)
- Van Taylor (TX–3)
- Glenn Thompson (PA–15)
- Mike Turner (OH–10)
- Fred Upton (MI–6)
- Beth Van Duyne (TX–24)
- Ann Wagner (MO–2)
- Michael Waltz (FL–6)
- Brad Wenstrup (OH–2)
- Bruce Westerman (AR–4)
- Rob Wittman (VA–1)
- Steve Womack (AR–3)
- Don Young (AK–AL)

Nay: 93 seats Yea: 6 seats Not shown: 1 seat

Senate"Objection to the electoral ballot certification with regard to the state of Arizona"
Party	Votes for	Votes against	Not voting
Republican (51)	6: Ted Cruz (TX); Josh Hawley (MO); Cindy Hyde-Smith (MS); John Kennedy (LA); Roger Marshall (KS); Tommy Tuberville (AL)	45	–
Democratic (46)	–	46	–
Independent (2)	–	2: Angus King (ME); Bernie Sanders (VT)	–
Total (99) (Note: The reason for the total vote count being 99 was a vacancy in one of Georgia's senate seats. Senator David Perdue's term had ended, and his successor, Jon Ossoff, had yet to be sworn-in, having won the run-off election the day before the counting of the electoral vote.)	6	93	–

=== Pennsylvania ===
Nay: 282 seats Not voting/not present: 13 seats (11 not voting, 2 not present) Yea: 138 seats Not shown: 2 seats

House of Representatives"On agreeing to the objection"
Party	Votes for	Votes against	Not voting	Not present
Democratic (222)	–	218	4: Alcee Hastings (FL–20); David Scott (GA–13); Rashida Tlaib (MI–13); David Trone (MD–6)	–
Republican (211)	138	64	7: Gus Bilirakis (FL–12); Kevin Brady (TX–8); Ken Buck (CO–4); Kay Granger (TX–12); David Joyce (OH–14); Jake LaTurner (KS–2); Michelle Steel (CA–48)	2: María Elvira Salazar (FL–27); David Valadao (CA–21)
Total (433)	138	282	11	2

Republicans voting for the objection (138)
- Robert Aderholt (AL–4)
- Rick W. Allen (GA–12)
- Jodey Arrington (TX–19)
- Brian Babin (TX–36)
- Jim Baird (IN–4)
- Jim Banks (IN–3)
- Cliff Bentz (OR–2)
- Jack Bergman (MI–1)
- Stephanie Bice (OK–5)
- Andy Biggs (AZ–5)
- Dan Bishop (NC–9)
- Lauren Boebert (CO–3)
- Mike Bost (IL–12)
- Mo Brooks (AL–5)
- Ted Budd (NC–13)
- Tim Burchett (TN–2)
- Michael C. Burgess (TX–26)
- Ken Calvert (CA–42)
- Kat Cammack (FL–3)
- Jerry Carl (AL–1)
- Buddy Carter (GA–1)
- John Carter (TX–31)
- Madison Cawthorn (NC–11)
- Steve Chabot (OH–1)
- Ben Cline (VA–6)
- Michael Cloud (TX–27)
- Andrew Clyde (GA–9)
- Tom Cole (OK–4)
- Rick Crawford (AR–1)
- Warren Davidson (OH–8)
- Scott DesJarlais (TN–4)
- Mario Díaz-Balart (FL–25)
- Byron Donalds (FL–19)
- Jeff Duncan (SC–3)
- Neal Dunn (FL–2)
- Ron Estes (KS–4)
- Pat Fallon (TX–4)
- Michelle Fischbach (MN–7)
- Scott L. Fitzgerald (WI–5)
- Chuck Fleischmann (TN–3)
- Virginia Foxx (NC–5)
- Scott Franklin (FL–15)
- Russ Fulcher (ID–1)
- Matt Gaetz (FL–1)
- Mike Garcia (CA–25)
- Bob Gibbs (OH–7)
- Carlos A. Giménez (FL–26)
- Louie Gohmert (TX–1)
- Bob Good (VA–5)
- Lance Gooden (TX–5)
- Paul Gosar (AZ–4)
- Garret Graves (LA–6)
- Sam Graves (MO–6)
- Mark E. Green (TN–7)
- Marjorie Taylor Greene (GA–14)
- Morgan Griffith (VA–9)
- Michael Guest (MS–3)
- Jim Hagedorn (MN–1)
- Andy Harris (MD–1)
- Diana Harshbarger (TN–1)
- Vicky Hartzler (MO–4)
- Kevin Hern (OK–1)
- Yvette Herrell (NM–2)
- Jody Hice (GA–10)
- Clay Higgins (LA–3)
- Richard Hudson (NC–8)
- Darrell Issa (CA–50)
- Ronny Jackson (TX–13)
- Chris Jacobs (NY–27)
- Mike Johnson (LA–4)
- Bill Johnson (OH–6)
- Jim Jordan (OH–4)
- John Joyce (PA–13)
- Fred Keller (PA–12)
- Trent Kelly (MS–1)
- Mike Kelly (PA–16)
- David Kustoff (TN–8)
- Doug LaMalfa (CA–1)
- Doug Lamborn (CO–5)
- Debbie Lesko (AZ–8)
- Billy Long (MO–7)
- Barry Loudermilk (GA–11)
- Frank Lucas (OK–3)
- Blaine Luetkemeyer (MO–3)
- Nicole Malliotakis (NY–11)
- Tracey Mann (KS–1)
- Brian Mast (FL–18)
- Kevin McCarthy (CA–23)
- Lisa McClain (MI–10)
- Dan Meuser (PA–9)
- Mary Miller (IL–15)
- Carol Miller (WV–3)
- Alex Mooney (WV–2)
- Barry Moore (AL–2)
- Markwayne Mullin (OK–2)
- Greg Murphy (NC–3)
- Troy Nehls (TX–22)
- Ralph Norman (SC–5)
- Devin Nunes (CA–22)
- Jay Obernolte (CA–8)
- Burgess Owens (UT–4)
- Steven Palazzo (MS–4)
- Gary Palmer (AL–6)
- Greg Pence (IN–6)
- Scott Perry (PA–10)
- August Pfluger (TX–11)
- Bill Posey (FL–8)
- Guy Reschenthaler (PA–14)
- Tom Rice (SC–7)
- Hal Rogers (KY–5)
- Mike Rogers (AL–3)
- John Rose (TN–6)
- Matt Rosendale (MT–AL)
- David Rouzer (NC–7)
- John Rutherford (FL–4)
- Steve Scalise (LA–1)
- David Schweikert (AZ–6)
- Pete Sessions (TX–17)
- Jason Smith (MO–8)
- Adrian Smith (NE–3)
- Lloyd Smucker (PA–11)
- Elise Stefanik (NY–21)
- Greg Steube (FL–17)
- Chris Stewart (UT–2)
- Glenn Thompson (PA–15)
- Tom Tiffany (WI–7)
- William Timmons (SC–4)
- Jeff Van Drew (NJ–2)
- Beth Van Duyne (TX–24)
- Tim Walberg (MI–7)
- Jackie Walorski (IN–2)
- Randy Weber (TX–14)
- Daniel Webster (FL–11)
- Roger Williams (TX–25)
- Joe Wilson (SC–2)
- Rob Wittman (VA–1)
- Ron Wright (TX–6)
- Lee Zeldin (NY–1)
Republicans voting against the objection (64)
- Mark Amodei (NV–2)
- Kelly Armstrong (ND–AL)
- Don Bacon (NE–2)
- Troy Balderson (OH–12)
- Andy Barr (KY–6)
- Vern Buchanan (FL–16)
- Larry Bucshon (IN–8)
- Liz Cheney (WY–AL)
- James Comer (KY–1)
- Dan Crenshaw (TX–2)
- John Curtis (UT–3)
- Rodney Davis (IL–13)
- Tom Emmer (MN–6)
- Randy Feenstra (IA–4)
- Drew Ferguson (GA–3)
- Brian Fitzpatrick (PA–1)
- Jeff Fortenberry (NE–1)
- Mike Gallagher (WI–8)
- Andrew Garbarino (NY–2)
- Tony Gonzales (TX–23)
- Anthony Gonzalez (OH–16)
- Glenn Grothman (WI–6)
- Brett Guthrie (KY–2)
- Jaime Herrera Beutler (WA–3)
- French Hill (AR–2)
- Ashley Hinson (IA–1)
- Trey Hollingsworth (IN–9)
- Bill Huizenga (MI–2)
- Dusty Johnson (SD–AL)
- John Katko (NY–24)
- Young Kim (CA–39)
- Adam Kinzinger (IL–16)
- Darin LaHood (IL–18)
- Bob Latta (OH–5)
- Nancy Mace (SC–1)
- Thomas Massie (KY–4)
- Michael McCaul (TX–10)
- Tom McClintock (CA–4)
- Patrick McHenry (NC–10)
- David McKinley (WV–1)
- Peter Meijer (MI–3)
- Mariannette Miller-Meeks (IA–2)
- John Moolenaar (MI–4)
- Blake Moore (UT–1)
- Dan Newhouse (WA–4)
- Tom Reed (NY–23)
- Cathy McMorris Rodgers (WA–5)
- Chip Roy (TX–21)
- Austin Scott (GA–8)
- Mike Simpson (ID–2)
- Chris Smith (NJ–4)
- Victoria Spartz (IN–5)
- Pete Stauber (MN–8)
- Bryan Steil (WI–1)
- Steve Stivers (OH–15)
- Van Taylor (TX–3)
- Mike Turner (OH–10)
- Fred Upton (MI–6)
- Ann Wagner (MO–2)
- Michael Waltz (FL–6)
- Brad Wenstrup (OH–2)
- Bruce Westerman (AR–4)
- Steve Womack (AR–3)
- Don Young (AK–AL)

Nay: 92 seats Yea: 7 seats Not shown: 1 seat

Senate"Objection to the electoral ballot certification with regard to the state of Pennsylvania"
Party	Votes for	Votes against	Not voting
Republican (51)	7: Ted Cruz (TX); Josh Hawley (MO); Cindy Hyde-Smith (MS); Cynthia Lummis (WY); Roger Marshall (KS); Rick Scott (FL); Tommy Tuberville (AL)	44	–
Democratic (46)	–	46	–
Independent (2)	–	2: Angus King (ME); Bernie Sanders (VT)	–
Total (99)	7	92	–

== Aftermath ==
On January 11, 2021, Representative Cori Bush of Missouri filed a resolution calling for the possible expulsion of more than 100 Republican members of the U.S. House of Representatives who voted against certifying results of the presidential election, and Senator Sheldon Whitehouse of Rhode Island said the Senate Ethics Committee "must consider the expulsion, or censure and punishment, of senators Cruz and Hawley, and perhaps others."

On December 22, 2022, the United States Senate passed the Electoral Count Reform and Presidential Transition Improvement Act of 2022, sponsored by Senator Susan Collins of Maine and Senator Joe Manchin of West Virginia. After about a year of negotiations, it became Division P of the Consolidated Appropriations Act, 2023, which passed 68–29 in the Senate and 225–201 in the House the following day. It was signed into law by President Joe Biden on December 29.

Some of the highlights of the bill:

- Identifies each state's governor as responsible for submitting certificates of ascertainment, unless otherwise specified by state laws or constitutions.
- Provides for expedited review, including a three-judge panel with a direct appeal to the Supreme Court, of certain claims related to a state's certificate identifying its electors.
- Requires Congress to defer to slates of electors submitted by a state's executive pursuant to the judgments of state or federal courts.
- Clarifies that the vice president cannot solely determine, accept, reject, or otherwise adjudicate disputes over electors.
- Raises objection threshold from one member of each chamber to 20% of each chamber.
- Prohibits state legislatures from declaring a "failed election". They can now move their election only under "extraordinary and catastrophic" circumstances.

== See also ==
- 2020 United States presidential election
- Presidential transition of Joe Biden
- Inauguration of Joe Biden
- Attempts to overturn the 2020 United States presidential election
- Sedition Caucus
