= Lynn Rogers (politician) =

American politician and businessman (born 1958)

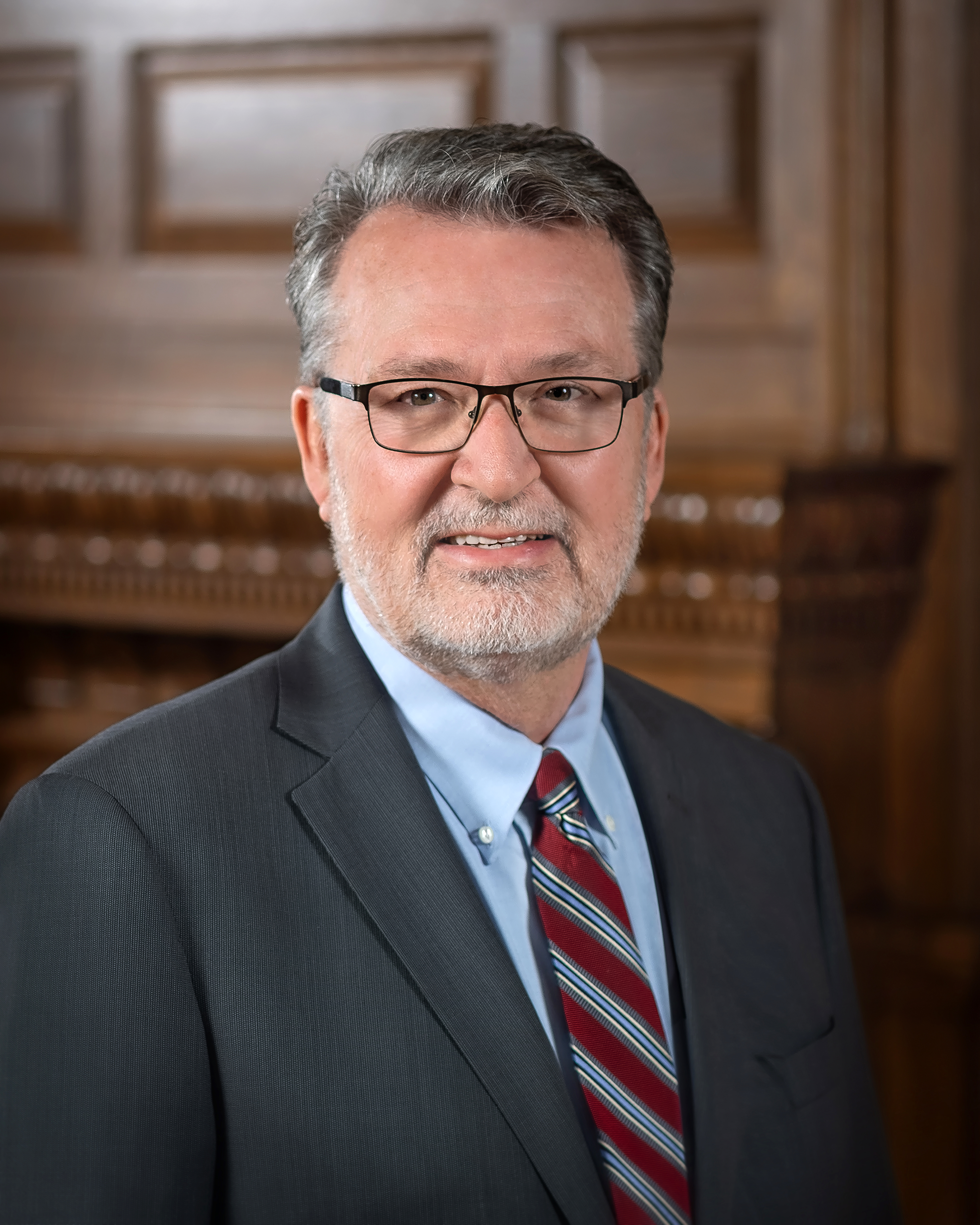
- Official portrait, 2018

41st Treasurer of Kansas
- In office January 2, 2021 – January 9, 2023
- Governor: Laura Kelly
- Preceded by: Jake LaTurner
- Succeeded by: Steven Johnson

51st Lieutenant Governor of Kansas
- In office January 14, 2019 – January 2, 2021
- Governor: Laura Kelly
- Preceded by: Tracey Mann
- Succeeded by: David Toland

Member of the Kansas Senate from the 25th district
- In office January 9, 2017 – January 14, 2019
- Preceded by: Michael O'Donnell
- Succeeded by: Mary Ware

Personal details
- Born: Lynn Wayne Rogers; September 11, 1958 (age 68) Fremont, Nebraska, U.S.
- Party: Democratic (2015–present)
- Other political affiliations: Republican (before 2015)
- Spouse: Kris
- Children: 3
- Education: University of Nebraska–Lincoln (BA)

Lynn Wayne Rogers (born September 11, 1958) is an American politician and businessman who served as the 41st Kansas State Treasurer from 2021 to 2023. He previously served as the 51st lieutenant governor of Kansas from 2019 to 2021. A Democrat, he had previously served on the board of Wichita Public Schools from 2001 to 2017, and in the Kansas Senate representing the 25th district in west Wichita from 2017 to 2019.

== Early life and education ==
Rogers was born on September 11, 1958, in Fremont, Nebraska. Raised by Republican parents, he grew up on a large hog farm in rural Nebraska. His grandfather was a county commissioner, and his father served on a local school board.

Rogers earned a Bachelor of Arts degree in business administration from the University of Nebraska–Lincoln in 1980.

== Career ==
After graduating from college, Rogers began working as a marketing specialist for Citibank Savings. After working for Citibank in Chicago, he moved with his wife to Wichita, Kansas in 1985, where he accepted a marketing position with the Farm Credit Bank of Wichita. In 1993, Rogers became a vice president with CoBank Farm Credit Leasing, where he would remain until his election to the Kansas Senate in 2016.

=== School district politics ===
In the 1990s, as a parent of a public school student, Rogers was active in a Wichita-area Parent-teacher organization (PTO), and aided fundraising for the Wichita Public Schools, including the district's bond drive in 2000. Rogers' first elected office was as a member of the Wichita School Board, where he served from 2001 to 2018.

During his tenure on the school board, Rogers switched his affiliation from the Republican Party to the Democratic Party, citing frustration with Republicans in attempts to gut support for the public schools.

=== Kansas Senate ===
In 2016, he was elected to the Kansas Senate's 25th district, replacing outgoing Republican Senator Michael O'Donnell, who vacated the seat to run for Sedgwick County Commissioner. In his time as a senator, Rogers worked to "reverse the Brownback-Colyer tax experiment and invest more in our schools." Rogers focused primarily on education, agricultural and banking issues.

In the Kansas Senate, senator Laura Kelly sat at the desk next to his, and became his mentor.

=== Lieutenant governor ===
On May 24, 2018, Senator Kelly announced that she had selected Rogers as her running mate in the 2018 Kansas gubernatorial election. On November 6, 2018, Kelly and Rogers defeated the Republican gubernatorial ticket of Kris Kobach and Wink Hartman, as well as the independent ticket of Greg Orman and John Doll. Rogers became the first lieutenant governor from Wichita since fellow Democrat Thomas Docking served in the 1980s.

In addition to representing Kansas in official visits to other states, Rogers has spent much of his tenure traveling extensively throughout the state, engaging in political outreach, and visiting over half of the state's 105 counties.

=== Kansas Treasurer ===
In December 2020, Governor Laura Kelly announced that she had selected Rogers to replace Jake LaTurner as Kansas State Treasurer after LaTurner was elected to the United States House of Representatives. Rogers assumed office on January 2, 2021, with David Toland succeeding him as Lieutenant Governor. He ran for a full term in 2022, losing to Republican State Representative Steven C. Johnson.

== Personal life ==
Rogers is married to Kris Rogers. They have grown children, including a son who serves as a staff attorney for the Oklahoma Supreme Court. They have a daughter who teaches in the Kansas City area, and another son "involved in Wichita's arts community."

Kansas Senate
Preceded by Michael O'Donnell	Member of the Kansas Senate from the 25th district 2017–2019	Succeeded by Mary Ware
Party political offices
Preceded by Jill Docking	Democratic nominee for Lieutenant Governor of Kansas; 2018	Succeeded by David Toland
Preceded by Marci Francisco	Democratic nominee for Treasurer of Kansas; 2022	Most recent
Political offices
Preceded by Tracey Mann	Lieutenant Governor of Kansas; 2019–2021	Succeeded by David Toland
Preceded by Jake LaTurner	Treasurer of Kansas; 2021–2023	Succeeded by Steven C. Johnson
