= Don Hineman =

American politician

Majority Leader of the Kansas House of Representatives
- In office January 9, 2017 – January 14, 2019
- Preceded by: Jene Vickrey
- Succeeded by: Dan Hawkins

Member of the Kansas House of Representatives from the 118th district
- In office January 12, 2009 – January 11, 2021
- Preceded by: Virginia Beamer
- Succeeded by: Jim Minnix

Personal details
- Born: May 27, 1947 (age 79) Dighton, Kansas, U.S.
- Party: Republican
- Education: University of Kansas, Lawrence (BS); University of Michigan, Ann Arbor (MBA, MS)

Don Hineman (born May 27, 1947) is a Republican member of the Kansas House of Representatives, representing the 118th district. He has served since 2009. He was the Majority leader from 2017 to 2019.

Don is the older brother of Linda Gallagher who had served in the House since 2015 through 2019. Don was the Majority Leader in 2017–2018. They are both moderate Republicans. Their father, Kalo Hineman, also served in the Kansas House from 1975 until he was appointed to the Commodity Futures Trading Commission by Ronald Reagan in mid-term, 1981.

Prior to being elected to the House, Hineman served as a Lane County Commissioner for 16 years, and was a member of the Dighton City Council for 3½ years.

He has been president of the Kansas Livestock Association, chairman of the Kansas Alliance for Education, and sat on the board of the National Cattlemen's Beef Association.

Hineman is married to Betsy Hineman.

== Committee membership ==
- Education
- Vision 2020
- Veterans, Military and Homeland Security
- Agriculture and Natural Resources

== Major donors ==
The top five donors to Hineman's 2008 campaign:

- 1. Kansas Republican Party - $1,500
- 2. Kansas Contractors Assoc. - $500
- 3. Campbell, Loren & Amber - $500
- 4. Pioneer Inc. $500
- 5. Stanley, Ellen May $500

Kansas House of Representatives
Preceded by Jene Vickrey	Majority Leader of the Kansas House of Representatives; 2017–2019	Succeeded by Dan Hawkins
