= Kelly Meigs =

American politician

Member of the Kansas House of Representatives from the 23rd district
- In office January 14, 2013 – January 12, 2015
- Preceded by: Brett Hildabrand
- Succeeded by: Linda Gallagher

Member of the Kansas House of Representatives from the 17th district
- In office January 10, 2011 – January 14, 2013
- Preceded by: Jill Quigley
- Succeeded by: Brett Hildabrand

Personal details
- Born: November 7, 1964 (age 61) Kansas City, Missouri, U.S.
- Party: Republican
- Spouse: Michael

Kelly Meigs (born November 7, 1964) is a Republican member of the Kansas House of Representatives representing the 23rd district. She served in the 17th district from 2011 to 2013, and won her election in the 23rd district in 2012. She received a Bachelor of Science in elementary education from Evangel University in 1987 and has employment experience as a teacher. She and her husband, Mike, have four children. The American Conservative Union gave her a 91% evaluation.
