= Milack Talia =

American politician

Member of the Kansas House of Representatives from the 23rd district
- In office January 12, 2009 – January 10, 2011
- Preceded by: Judith Morrison
- Succeeded by: Brett Hildabrand

Personal details
- Born: January 16, 1977 (age 49)
- Party: Democratic

Milack Talia (born 16 January 1977) is a former Democratic member of the Kansas House of Representatives, who represented the 23rd district. He served from 2009 to 2011. Talia ran for re-election in 2010, but was defeated by Republican Brett Hildabrand.

Prior to his election, Talia worked as a lawyer and an engineer. He previously ran unsuccessfully for the House in 2006.

== Committee membership ==
- Energy and Utilities
- General Government Budget
- Judiciary
- Engineering Success for the Future of KS Taskforce

== Major donors ==
The top 5 donors to Talia's 2008 campaign:

- 1. Kansas Democratic Party $18,086
- 2. Talia, Milack $4,139
- 3. Joco Democratic Central Cmte $1,000
- 4. United Auto Workers Cap Council Local 31 Jeff Manning $1,000
- 5. Kansas National Education Assoc $1,000
