= Jill Quigley =

American politician

Member of the Kansas House of Representatives from the 17th district
- In office January 15, 2008 – January 10, 2011
- Preceded by: Stephanie Sharp
- Succeeded by: Kelly Meigs

Personal details
- Born: May 11, 1953 (age 73) Eldon, Missouri, U.S.
- Party: Republican
- Spouse: Jim (m. 1975)
- Children: 3
- Education: University of Missouri; University of Michigan

Jill Quigley (born May 11, 1953) is a former Republican member of the Kansas House of Representatives, who represented the 17th district. She served from 2008 to 2011. Quigley ran for re-election in 2010, but was defeated in the primary election by Kelly Meigs.

Prior to her election, Quigley has worked in various nursing positions for over 35 years. Currently she is an outreach coordinator with Southwest Boulevard Family Health Care. She received her BS in Nursing from the University of Missouri and her MS in Nursing from the University of Michigan.

Quigley is a member of the Junior League of Wyandotte and Johnson Counties and has served in numerous positions on the PTA of Rising Star Elementary School, Trailridge Middle School, and Shawnee Mission Northwest High School.

She has been married to her husband Jim since 1975; they have three children.

== Committee membership ==
- Commerce and Labor
- Health and Human Services
- Transportation and Public Safety Budget

== Major donors ==
The top 5 donors to Quigley's 2008 campaign:

- 1. Quigley, Jill $3,000
- 2. Kansans for Lifesaving Cures $1,000
- 3. Kansas Medical Society $1,000
- 4. Kansas National Education Assoc $1,000
- 5. Kansas Assoc of Realtors $900
