= Steven C. Johnson (Kansas politician) =

American politician

Steven Johnson

42nd Treasurer of Kansas
- Incumbent
- Assumed office January 9, 2023
- Governor: Laura Kelly; Cindy Holscher (elect)
- Preceded by: Lynn Rogers

Member of the Kansas House of Representatives from the 108th district
- In office January 10, 2011 – January 9, 2023
- Preceded by: Don Svaty
- Succeeded by: Vacant

Personal details
- Born: November 29, 1965 (age 60) Salina, Kansas, U.S.
- Party: Republican
- Education: Kansas State University (BS); University of Chicago (MBA)

Steven C. Johnson (November 29, 1965) is an American politician serving as the 42nd Kansas State Treasurer since January 9, 2023. He was a member of the Kansas House of Representatives representing the 108th district in Saline County, Kansas from 2011 to 2023. A Republican, he was first elected in 2010 and served as chairman of the House Taxation Committee.

Party political offices
Preceded by Jake LaTurner	Republican nominee for Treasurer of Kansas; 2022, 2026	Most recent
Political offices
Preceded by Lynn Rogers	Treasurer of Kansas; 2023–present	Incumbent
