= Linda Gallagher =

American politician

Member of the Kansas House of Representatives from the 23rd district
- In office January 12, 2015 – January 14, 2019
- Preceded by: Kelly Meigs
- Succeeded by: Susan Ruiz

Personal details
- Born: April 19, 1957 (age 69) Dighton, Kansas
- Party: Republican
- Spouse: Michael Gallagher
- Parent: Kalo Hineman (father)

Linda Gallagher (born April 19, 1957) is an American politician and beauty pageant titleholder. She served in the Kansas House of Representatives from the 23rd district from 2015 to 2019, until being defeated by Democrat Susan Ruiz. She is the sister of Don Hineman who has served in the House since 2009, and was the Majority Leader in 2017–2018. They are both moderate Republicans. Their father, Kalo Hineman, also served in the Kansas House from 1979 until he was appointed to the Commodity Futures Trading Commission by Ronald Reagan in mid-term, 1981.
