= Tracey Mann =

American politician (born 1976)

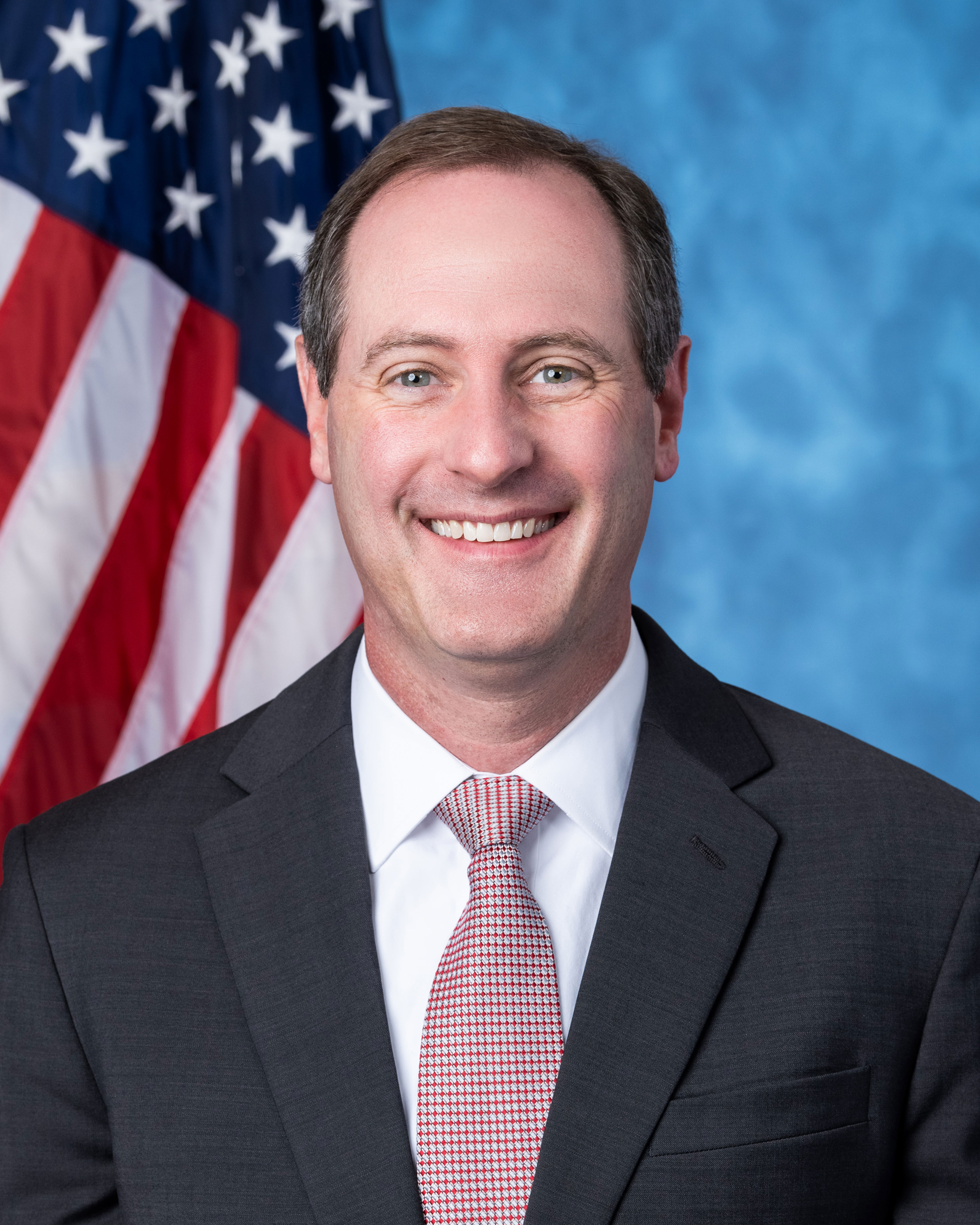
- Official portrait, 2021

Member of the U.S. House of Representatives from Kansas's 1st district
- Incumbent
- Assumed office January 3, 2021
- Preceded by: Roger Marshall

50th Lieutenant Governor of Kansas
- In office February 14, 2018 – January 14, 2019
- Governor: Jeff Colyer
- Preceded by: Jeff Colyer
- Succeeded by: Lynn Rogers

Personal details
- Born: Tracey Robert Mann; December 17, 1976 (age 49) Gove County, Kansas, U.S.
- Party: Republican
- Spouse: Audrey Haynes (m. 2002)
- Children: 4
- Education: Kansas State University (BS)
- Website: House website

Tracey Robert Mann (born December 17, 1976) is an American businessman and politician who has served as the U.S. representative from Kansas's 1st congressional district since 2021. A member of the Republican Party, his district, popularly known as "the Big First," includes parts of 63 counties in central and western Kansas and is the seventh-largest district in the nation that does not cover an entire state.

Mann served as the 50th lieutenant governor of Kansas from 2018 to 2019. He was appointed by Governor Jeff Colyer in February 2018, after Colyer ascended from the lieutenant governorship upon Sam Brownback's resignation.

== Early life and education ==
Mann was born and raised on his family farm south of Quinter, Kansas. Mann attended Quinter High School. In his senior year, Mann was elected to serve as FFA president and student council president. During his college years, Mann worked as an intern for then-U.S. Representative Jerry Moran. He also served as the student body president of Kansas State University.

== Lieutenant Governor of Kansas ==
=== 2018 primary for governor ===
Jeff Colyer narrowly lost the 2018 Republican primary to Kris Kobach, and he and Mann left office the next year.

=== Tenure ===
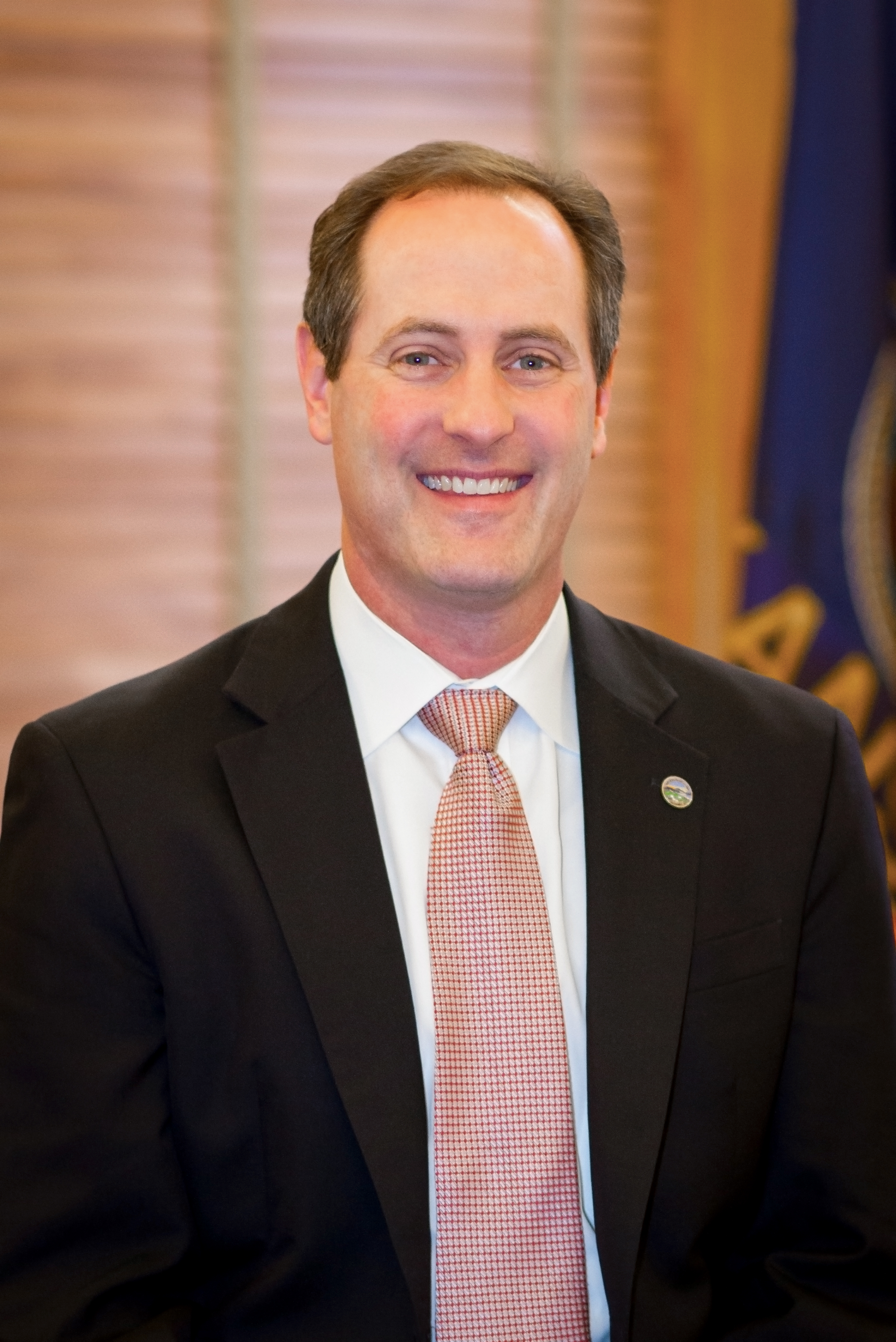
Mann's official photo as Lieutenant Governor

Two weeks after Colyer ascended to the office of Governor of Kansas, Mann was appointed as Colyer's lieutenant governor. He was sworn in on February 14, 2018.

== U.S. House of Representatives ==
=== Elections ===
==== 2010 ====
Mann ran for Kansas's 1st congressional district in the 2010 elections to the United States House of Representatives, losing to Tim Huelskamp in the Republican primary.

During his 2010 campaign, Mann repeatedly insisted President Barack Obama needed to produce his birth certificate to prove that he was an American citizen. The Hutchinson News withdrew its endorsement of Mann, stating, "he questions the citizenship of President Barack Obama despite evidence that is irrefutable to most objective, rational people - including a birth certificate released by the Hawaii secretary of state and birth announcements printed in Honolulu's two major newspapers." On June 21, 2010, Mann said on a Salina radio program that he thought Obama "needs to come forth with his papers and show everyone that he is an American citizen." He made similar comments that day at a forum at Elkhart, Kansas. Though Mann formerly expressed support for birtherism, he has since renounced those beliefs.

==== 2020 ====
Mann made another bid for the 1st in 2020 after two-term incumbent Roger Marshall gave up the seat to run for U.S. Senate. On August 4, 2020, Mann defeated Air Force veteran Bill Clifford in the Republican primary–the real contest in this heavily Republican district–and Democrat Kali Barnett in the general election, with 71% of the vote.

=== Tenure ===
==== Domestic policy ====
Mann voted to overturn the results of the 2020 United States Presidential election.

Mann voted against the Equality Act in 2021 and against the Respect for Marriage Act in 2022.

Along with all Kansas congressmembers, Mann voted for the Laken Riley Act.

In 2025, the Trump administration moved to delist the lesser prairie chicken from the Endangered Species Act of 1973. Mann had previously led efforts to delist the chicken, but then-President Joe Biden vetoed the legislation.

==== Economy ====
In May 2025, Mann told KSNT, "I strongly believe we must strengthen Medicaid to protect benefits for the thousands of vulnerable Kansans who rely on it." He voted for the One Big Beautiful Bill Act on May 22, 2025.

==== Foreign policy ====
During the Gaza War, Mann voted to send $26 billion to Israel to support "its effort to defend itself against Iran and its proxies, and to reimburse US military operations in response to recent attacks."

Mann voted against additional aid to Ukraine in 2024.

=== Committee assignments ===
For the 119th Congress:

- Committee on Agriculture
  - Subcommittee on Commodity Markets, Digital Assets, and Rural Development
  - Subcommittee on Livestock, Dairy, and Poultry (Chairman)
  - Subcommittee on Nutrition and Foreign Agriculture
- Committee on Transportation and Infrastructure
  - Subcommittee on Aviation
  - Subcommittee on Railroads, Pipelines, and Hazardous Materials
  - Subcommittee on Water Resources and Environment

=== Caucus memberships ===
- House Hunger Caucus
- FFA Caucus
- Congressional Motorcycle Caucus
- Congressional Western Caucus

== Electoral history ==
Kansas's 1st congressional district Republican primary, 2010
Party	Candidate	Votes	%
Republican	Tim Huelskamp	34,819	34.8%
Republican	Jim Barnett	25,047	25%
Republican	Tracey Mann	21,161	21.1%

Kansas's 1st congressional district Republican primary, 2020
Party	Candidate	Votes	%
Republican	Tracey Mann	65,373	54.21%
Republican	Bill Clifford	39,914	33.10%
Republican	Jerry Molstad	9,545	7.92%
Republican	Michael Soetaert	5,756	4.77%

Kansas's 1st congressional district general election, 2020
Party	Candidate	Votes	%
Republican	Tracey Mann	208,229	71.16%
Democratic	Kali Barnett	84,393	28.84%

Kansas's 1st congressional district general election, 2022
Party	Candidate	Votes	%
Republican	Tracey Mann	161,333	67.67%
Democratic	Jimmy Beard	77,092	32.33%

Kansas's 1st congressional district general election, 2024
Party	Candidate	Votes	%
Republican	Tracey Mann	210,493	69.14%
Democratic	Paul Buskirk	93,965	30.86%

== Personal life ==
Mann resides in Salina, Kansas, where he works as a commercial real estate broker. He also owns his family's farm in Quinter, Kansas. Mann is a Pietist.

Political offices
Preceded by Jeff Colyer	Lieutenant Governor of Kansas; 2018–2019	Succeeded by Lynn Rogers
U.S. House of Representatives
Preceded by Roger Marshall	Member of the U.S. House of Representatives from Kansas's 1st congressional district 2021–present	Incumbent
U.S. order of precedence (ceremonial)
Preceded by Nicole Malliotakis	United States representatives by seniority 262nd	Succeeded by Lisa McClain
