= Jake LaTurner =

American politician (born 1988)

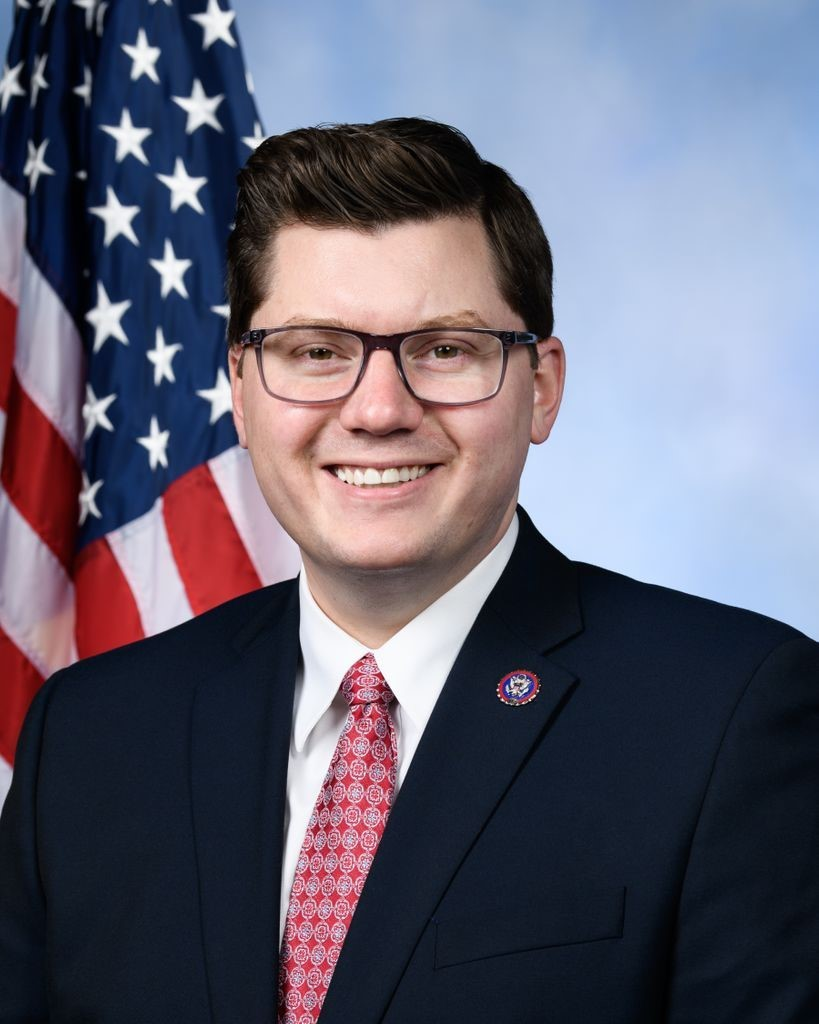
- Official portrait, 2021

Member of the U.S. House of Representatives from Kansas's 2nd district
- In office January 3, 2021 – January 3, 2025
- Preceded by: Steve Watkins
- Succeeded by: Derek Schmidt

40th Treasurer of Kansas
- In office April 25, 2017 – January 2, 2021
- Governor: Sam Brownback; Jeff Colyer; Laura Kelly
- Preceded by: Ron Estes
- Succeeded by: Lynn Rogers

Member of the Kansas Senate from the 13th district
- In office January 9, 2013 – April 25, 2017
- Preceded by: Bob Marshall
- Succeeded by: Richard Hilderbrand

Personal details
- Born: Jacob Andrew Joseph LaTurner; February 17, 1988 (age 38) Galena, Kansas, U.S.
- Party: Republican
- Spouse: Suzanne Van Gotten (m. 2009)
- Children: 4
- Education: Pittsburg State University (BA); Naval War College

Jacob Andrew Joseph LaTurner (born February 17, 1988) is an American politician who served as the U.S. representative for Kansas's 2nd congressional district from 2021 to 2025. A member of the Republican Party, LaTurner was the 40th Kansas state treasurer from 2017 to 2021 and a state senator from the 13th district from 2013 to 2017.

Upon his appointment as Kansas state treasurer by Kansas governor Sam Brownback, LaTurner became the youngest statewide official in the country. He was elected to the post in his own right in 2018, becoming the youngest elected statewide official in the United States. LaTurner briefly campaigned for the United States Senate in the 2020 election, before instead opting to run for the United States House of Representatives in Kansas's 2nd congressional district. He defeated incumbent U.S. representative Steve Watkins in the primary election, amid corruption allegations against Watkins, and won the general election against Topeka mayor Michelle De La Isla. On April 18, 2024, LaTurner announced he would not be seeking reelection.

== Early life and education ==
LaTurner was born and raised in Galena, Kansas. He graduated from Galena High School and enrolled at Pittsburg State University, where he earned his undergraduate degree in political science. LaTurner worked for former Kansas treasurer and congresswoman Lynn Jenkins during his time in college in her Pittsburg district office. According to Rep. Henry Cuellar, he is enrolled alongside him in the master's in defense and strategic studies program at Naval War College (as of 2023).

== Kansas Senate ==
After losing the 2008 District 13 primary election to Republican senator Bob Marshall, he defeated Marshall in a 2012 rematch. At age 24, he became the youngest member of the Kansas Senate. As a senator, LaTurner drafted legislation that would impose term limits on state legislators, reform the process for requesting public records, and combat potential nepotism. He faced opposition on these issues, including from Speaker of the Kansas House of Representatives Ray Merrick, a Republican, and Senate Democratic leader Anthony Hensley.

In February 2015, LaTurner was the lead sponsor of legislation allowing Kansas adults to carry firearms without a concealed carry permit. In 2016, he authored a bill limiting property tax increases.

== State Treasurer of Kansas ==
LaTurner was appointed Kansas state treasurer in April 2017 by Governor Sam Brownback. He replaced Ron Estes, who had been elected to the United States House of Representatives for Kansas's 4th congressional district. Appointed at age 29, LaTurner became the youngest statewide official in the country. Defeating state senator Marci Francisco in 2018, he became the youngest statewide elected official in the country.

As state treasurer, one of LaTurner's primary responsibilities was to oversee unclaimed property, over which there is over $350 million worth in Kansas. He completed a 105 County Tour within 5 months during his first year in office, and returned over $10 million during the tour. During LaTurner's first year in office, he returned a record amount of unclaimed property to Kansans, over $25.5 million. "Every dollar we return to the people of Kansas is a dollar that goes back into their local communities," LaTurner said. "Not only have we returned a record amount of money to Kansans, but we have made the process more user friendly and we have improved the service offered to Kansans."

LaTurner also administered the Kansas Learning Quest 529 Education Savings and ABLE Savings Programs, which assist Kansans in saving for their future. During his first year in office, he implemented changes to the Kansas Learning Quest and ABLE Savings Programs. Under these changes, individuals living with a disability are able to roll over saved funds within a 529 Education Savings Account into their ABLE Account. Additionally, Learning Quest 529 Education Savings Account holders can utilize their funds for K-12 education tuition.

In December 2020, Governor Laura Kelly announced that she would appoint Lieutenant Governor Lynn Rogers to succeed LaTurner as treasurer. Rogers took office on January 2, 2021.

=== LaTurner v. United States ===
As Kansas Treasurer, LaTurner continued a legal case against the United States Department of the Treasury which requested the federal government return the proceeds from matured bonds to Kansas. Though a judge in a lower court sided with the state of Kansas, requiring the federal government to return approximately $150 million in savings bonds to the state of Kansas, the United States Court of Appeals overturned that decision and found in favor of the federal government. The bonds will still be returned to Kansans, but that process will be overseen at the federal, rather than state, level.

=== 2020 U.S. Senate campaign ===
On January 8, 2019, LaTurner announced his candidacy for the United States Senate in the 2020 election, hoping to succeed four-term incumbent Pat Roberts. LaTurner's announcement came roughly two weeks after Roberts announced his intention to retire in 2021. LaTurner announced his candidacy at age 30, the minimum age the United States Constitution requires a senator to be. As LaTurner's next election as state treasurer would not be until 2022, the Senate campaign was considered relatively low-stakes. Campaigning as a conservative, he supported Donald Trump's proposed Mexico–United States border wall, an expansion of the physical barrier along the Mexico–United States border, argued for fiscal responsibility, and supported term limits for federally elected politicians. Responding to questions at a meeting with five locals at the Garden City library, he said Representative Alexandria Ocasio-Cortez "thinks that the government can fix all of our problems for us and doesn't think that individuals have rights, naturally." "I think that what I believe in, and it's what our founders believed in, is that our rights come from God, not from the government... We need to continue to send people to Washington, D.C., that aren't afraid to stand up with President Trump and defend conservative principles."

LaTurner stated in several interviews that he would step aside and drop out of the race if United States secretary of state Mike Pompeo opted to run for the seat. In one interview, LaTurner stated that he would be the "first to support [Pompeo]," while in another he said Pompeo had "right up to the last minute. He can decide to run."

On September 9, 2019, LaTurner suspended his candidacy for the U.S. Senate, opting instead to run for the U.S. House in the 2020 election.

== U.S. House of Representatives ==
=== Elections ===
==== 2020 ====
While LaTurner was running his Senate campaign, incumbent Republican representative for Kansas's 2nd congressional district Steve Watkins was becoming embattled in several controversies, including that he inflated his business resume, was not present for important votes, voting fraud and allegations of sexual misconduct. Watkins and his staff had edited his Wikipedia page to remove content relating to the controversies. Many speculated Watkins was planning on resigning prior to the end of his term, which he adamantly denied. Watkins was charged with interference with law enforcement, providing false information; voting without being qualified; unlawful advance voting; and failing to notify the DMV of change of address. In response, former governor of Kansas Jeff Colyer publicly encouraged LaTurner to consider challenging Watkins for the seat.

LaTurner announced he would end his Senate campaign in order to challenge Watkins on September 4, 2019. In an interview with Politico, LaTurner said, "At the end of the day, we don't want to see another congressional seat be turned over to the Democrats in Kansas...Congressman Watkins, without question, puts this seat in jeopardy this cycle." Watkins had been elected in 2018 by a margin of less than 1%. LaTurner was able to move $470,000 cash on hand from his Senate campaign to his House campaign, giving him a large advantage over Watkins who had only $260,000 at the time of LaTurner's announcement. On August 4, 2020, LaTurner defeated Watkins in the Republican primary to run against Democratic Topeka Mayor Michelle De La Isla in the November 3 general election.

=== Tenure ===
On January 6, 2021, during the United States Electoral College vote count for the 2020 presidential elections, LaTurner voted in favor of sustaining the objection raised against Arizona's electoral votes after the session was earlier suspended when Trump supporters stormed and occupied the Capitol. Before the session concluded, he had to withdraw in quarantine because of a positive COVID-19 test, and thus was not able to vote on the objection to Pennsylvania's electoral votes. LaTurner voted against impeaching Trump in the following days. On April 18, 2024, LaTurner announced he would not be seeking reelection to the House of Representatives, citing a "toll" that Congressional service had taken on him. He also ruled out running for state offices in the 2026 midterm elections.

=== Committee assignments ===
- Committee on Homeland Security
  - Subcommittee on Cybersecurity, Infrastructure Protection and Innovation
  - Subcommittee on Intelligence and Counterterrorism
- Committee on Oversight and Accountability
  - Subcommittee on Government Operations
- Committee on Science, Space, and Technology
  - Subcommittee on Research and Technology

=== Caucus memberships ===
- Republican Study Committee

== Post-congressional career ==
In 2025, LaTurner became a partner at PLUS Communications, a strategic communications and public affairs firm based in the Washington, D.C. area.

== Electoral history ==
=== Primary results ===
Republican primary results
Party	Candidate	Votes	%
Republican	Jake LaTurner	47,898	49.1
Republican	Steve Watkins (incumbent)	33,053	33.9
Republican	Dennis Taylor	16,512	17.0
Total votes		97,463	100.0

=== General election ===
Kansas's 2nd congressional district, 2020
Party	Candidate	Votes	%
Republican	Jake LaTurner	185,464	57.6
Democratic	Michelle De La Isla	136,650	42.4
Total votes		322,114	100.0

Kansas's 2nd congressional district, 2022
Party	Candidate	Votes	%
Republican	Jake LaTurner (incumbent)	134,506	57.6
Democratic	Patrick Schmidt	98,852	42.4
Total votes		233,358	100.0

Political offices
Preceded by Ron Estes	Treasurer of Kansas; 2017–2021	Succeeded by Lynn Rogers
Party political offices
Preceded by Ron Estes	Republican nominee for Treasurer of Kansas; 2018	Succeeded by Steven Johnson
U.S. House of Representatives
Preceded by Steve Watkins	Member of the U.S. House of Representatives from Kansas's 2nd congressional district 2021–2025	Succeeded by Derek Schmidt
U.S. order of precedence (ceremonial)
Preceded by Mike Kopetski as Former U.S. Representative	Order of precedence of the United States as Former U.S. Representative	Succeeded by John J. Cavanaugh III as Former U.S. Representative
