= Kansas State Treasurer =

U.S. state executive officer

State Treasurer of Kansas
- Incumbent; Steven C. Johnson since January 9, 2023
- Term length: Four years
- Website: kansasstatetreasurer.com

The state treasurer of Kansas is the chief custodian of Kansas's cash deposits, monies from bond sales, and other securities and collateral and directs the investments of those assets. The treasurer provides for the safe and efficient operation of state government through effective banking, investment, and cash management.

The treasurer oversees an office that currently handles over $20 billion and an annual operating budget of $3.5 million. Key programs in the office are Bonds Services, Cash Management, Unclaimed Property, the Ag Loan and Housing Loan Deposit Programs and the Kansas 529 Education Savings Program, which has more than 143,000 accounts with total assets of over $2.7 billion. The Treasurer's office is a fee-funded agency. The treasurer also serves as a member of the Kansas Public Employee's Retirement System (KPERS) and the Pooled Money Investment Board.

== Divisions ==
- Administration
- Bond Services
- Cash Management
- Kansas Learning Quest
- Unclaimed Property

== Officeholders ==
=== Territorial treasurers ===
Name	Term	Party
Thomas Cramer	1855–1859	Democratic
Robert Mitchell	1859–1861	Democratic

=== State treasurers ===
Image	Name	Term	Party
	William Tholen; Elected, didn't serve	1859	Republican
	Hartwin Dutton	1861–1863	Republican
	William Spriggs	1863–1867	Republican
	Martin Anderson	1867–1869	Republican
	George Graham	1869–1871	Republican
	Josiah Hayes	1871–1874	Republican
	Samuel Lappin	1874–1875	Republican
	John Francis	1875–1883	Republican
	Samuel Howe	1883–1887	Republican
	James Hamilton	1887–1890	Republican
	William Sims	1890	Republican
	Solomon Stover	1891–1893	Republican
	William Biddle	1893–1895	Populist
	Otis Atherton	1895–1897	Republican
	David Heflebower	1897–1899	Populist
	Frank Grimes	1899–1903	Republican
	Thomas Kelly	1903–1907	Republican
	Mark Tulley	1907–1913	Republican
	Earl Akers	1913–1917	Republican
	Walter Payne	1917–1921	Republican
	E.T. Thompson	1921–1925	Republican
	Carl White	1925–1929	Republican
	Tom Boyd	1929–1933	Republican
	William Marion Jardine	1933–1934	Republican
	J.J. Rhodes	1934–1938	Republican
	Jibo Hewitt	1938–1939	Democratic
	Walter Wilson	1939–1945	Republican
	Elmer Beck	1945–1947	Republican
	Richard Fadely	1947–1959	Republican
	George Hart	1959–1961	Democratic
	Walter Peery	1961–1973	Republican
	Tom Van Sickle	1973–1975	Republican
	Joan Finney	1975–1991	Democratic
	Sally Thompson	1991–1998	Democratic
	Clyde Graeber	1998–1999	Republican
	Tim Shallenburger	1999–2003	Republican
	Lynn Jenkins	2003–2008	Republican
	Dennis McKinney	2009–2011	Democratic
	Ron Estes	2011–2017	Republican
	Jake LaTurner	2017–2021	Republican
	Lynn Rogers	2021–2023	Democratic
	Steven C. Johnson	2023–present	Republican
