= Laura Kelly =

Governor of Kansas since 2019

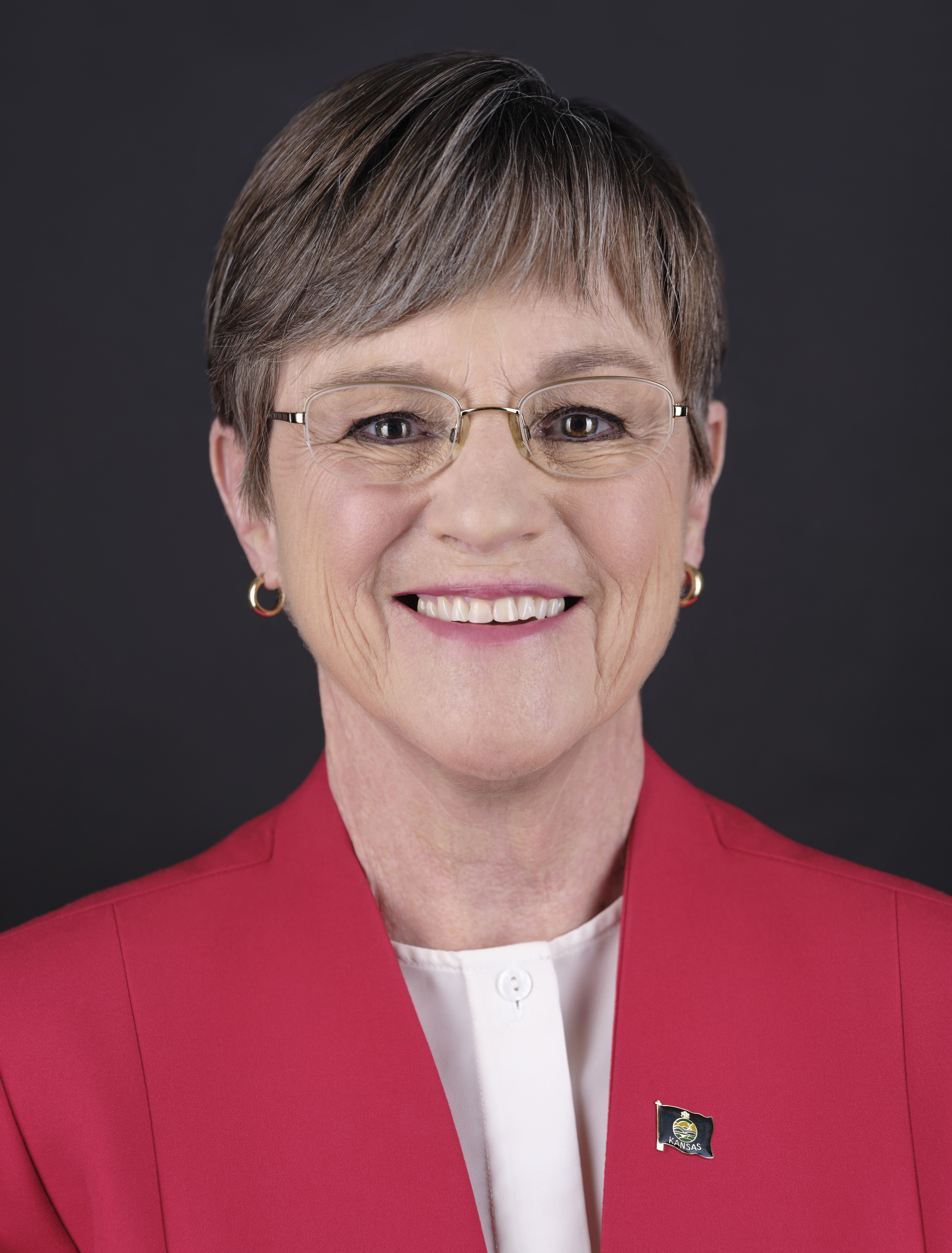
- Official portrait, 2018

48th Governor of Kansas
- Incumbent
- Assumed office January 14, 2019
- Lieutenant: Lynn Rogers; David Toland
- Preceded by: Jeff Colyer

Member of the Kansas Senate from the 18th district
- In office January 10, 2005 – January 14, 2019
- Preceded by: Dave Jackson
- Succeeded by: Vic Miller

Personal details
- Born: Laura Jeanne Kelly; January 24, 1950 (age 76) New York City, New York, U.S.
- Party: Democratic
- Spouse: Ted Daughety (m. 1983; div. 2024)
- Children: 2
- Education: Bradley University (BS); Indiana University Bloomington (MS)
- Website: Office website Campaign website
- Kelly's voice Kelly on the response to the COVID-19 pandemic in Kansas. Recorded May 20, 2020

Laura Jeanne Kelly (born January 24, 1950) is an American politician serving since 2019 as the 48th governor of Kansas. A member of the Democratic Party, she represented the 18th district in the Kansas Senate from 2005 to 2019. Kelly was elected governor in 2018 and reelected in 2022.

== Early life and education ==
Kelly was born in New York City to a military family that moved often and was stationed overseas. She studied at Bradley University in Illinois, earning a Bachelor of Science in psychology in 1971, and at Indiana University Bloomington, earning a Master of Science in therapeutic recreation. Kelly received the Bradley University Distinguished Alumna award and was inducted into Bradley's Centurion Society on October 4, 2021.

Kelly worked as a recreation therapist at New York's Rockland Children's Psychiatric Center. She became director of physical education and recreation therapy at the National Jewish Hospital for Respiratory and Immune Diseases. She then moved to Kansas, and became executive director at the Kansas Recreation and Park Association from 1988 to 2004.

== Early political career ==
Kelly was elected to the Kansas Senate representing northern Topeka in November 2004, later serving as Minority Whip. During her Senate tenure, from 2005 until her 2019 inauguration as governor, she was at times the Ranking Minority member of the Ways and Means Committee, Joint Committee on Home and Community Based Services and KanCare Oversight, and Public Health and Welfare Committee.

In late 2009, Kelly briefly considered a run for Kansas's 2nd congressional district. During the 2011–12 legislative sessions, she served as the Assistant Minority Leader of the Kansas Senate.

== Governor of Kansas ==
=== Election ===
==== 2018 ====
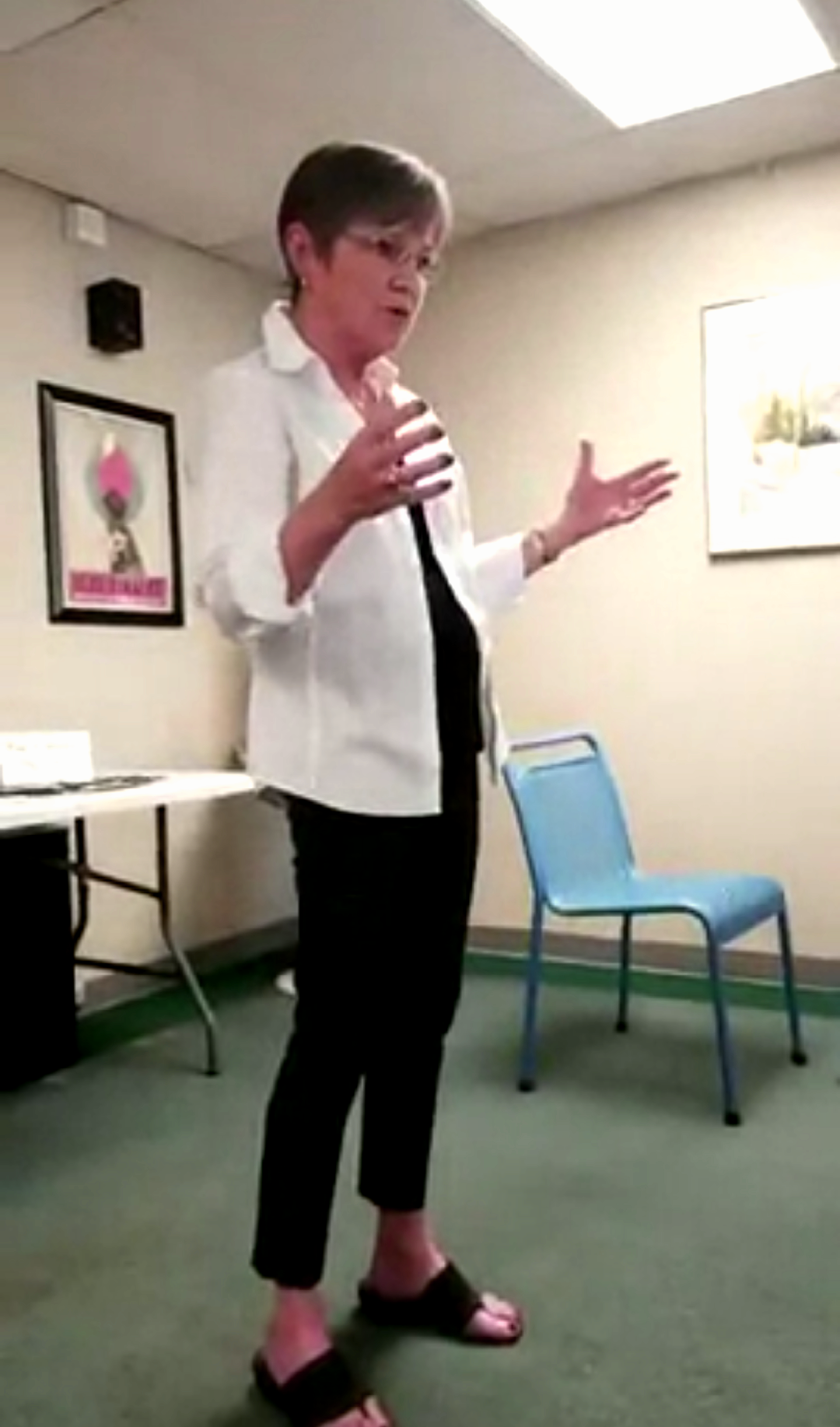
Kelly campaigning in June 2018

On December 15, 2017, Kelly announced her intention to run for governor of Kansas. In the Democratic primary she ran against former Wichita Mayor Carl Brewer and former Kansas Secretary of Agriculture Josh Svaty. On May 24, 2018, Kelly announced State Senator Lynn Rogers as her running mate. On August 7, she defeated Brewer and Svaty, receiving 51.5% of the vote.

In the general election, Kelly faced Republican Secretary of State Kris Kobach. Kelly was endorsed by former Kansas Governor and U.S. Secretary of Health and Human Services Kathleen Sebelius. She was also endorsed by 28 current or former Republican government officials, including former Kansas Governor Bill Graves; former State Senator, Lt. Governor and U.S. Senator Sheila Frahm, Lt. Gov. Gary Sherrer, Insurance Commissioner Sandy Praeger, Senate President Dick Bond, Senate President David Kerr, Senate Vice President John Vratil, Senate Majority Leaders Tim Emert and Lana Oleen; Senators Barbara Allen, David Wysong, Wint Winter Jr., Pete Brungardt, Ruth Teichman, Barbara Bollier, Audrey Langworthy, Terrie Huntington, Bob Vancrum, and Alicia Salisbury; Representatives JoAnn Pottorff, Ginger Barr, Jim Yonally, Jim Lowther, Fred Lorentz, and Representative and Republican Party Chairperson Rochelle Chronister; Republican National Delegate Don Johnston; and Representatives Joy Koesten and Charles Roth.

Graves said, "Laura Kelly is the only Democrat I have ever endorsed for public office. And the reason I'm doing that now is because I believe so much is at stake in the state of Kansas. I have known Laura for over 30 years. She has all the qualities and all the capabilities that we are looking for to lead the state during this difficult time and to reestablish the state to what it once was. ... Laura has integrity, and I know she will bring Kansans together regardless of party to solve problems." Former Republican state senator Tim Owens was the campaign treasurer for Kansas independent candidate Greg Orman, but he stepped down from that post on October 30 and endorsed Kelly, believing only she could beat Kobach.

Kelly described her candidacy as aimed at reversing the fiscal, educational and other "disasters" of Sam Brownback's governance. She characterized her opponent, who had been noted for his broad disenfranchisement of voters and legal strategies against immigrants, as "Sam Brownback on steroids".

On November 6, Kelly was elected with 48.0% of the vote to Kobach's 43.0% (the other 9% being split amongst two Independents and a Libertarian candidate). Kelly was inaugurated as Governor on January 14, 2019 at the Kansas State Capitol.

==== 2022 ====
Kelly was reelected on November 8, 2022, defeating Kansas Attorney General Derek Schmidt, 49.5% to 47.3%. Her second term began on January 9, 2023.

=== Cabinet ===
Office	Incumbent
Lieutenant Governor	David Toland
Adjutant General	Michael Venerdi
Secretary of Administration	Adam Proffitt
Secretary of Agriculture	Mike Beam
Secretary of Commerce	David Toland
Secretary of Corrections	Jeff Zmuda
Secretary of Health and Environment	Janet Stanek
Superintendent of the Highway Patrol	Erik Smith
Secretary for Children and Families	Laura Howard
Secretary of Labor	Amber Shultz
Secretary of Revenue	Mark Burghardt
Secretary of Transportation	Calvin Reed
Secretary of Wildlife and Parks	Chris Kennedy

=== Tenure and political positions ===
==== Budget and economic issues ====
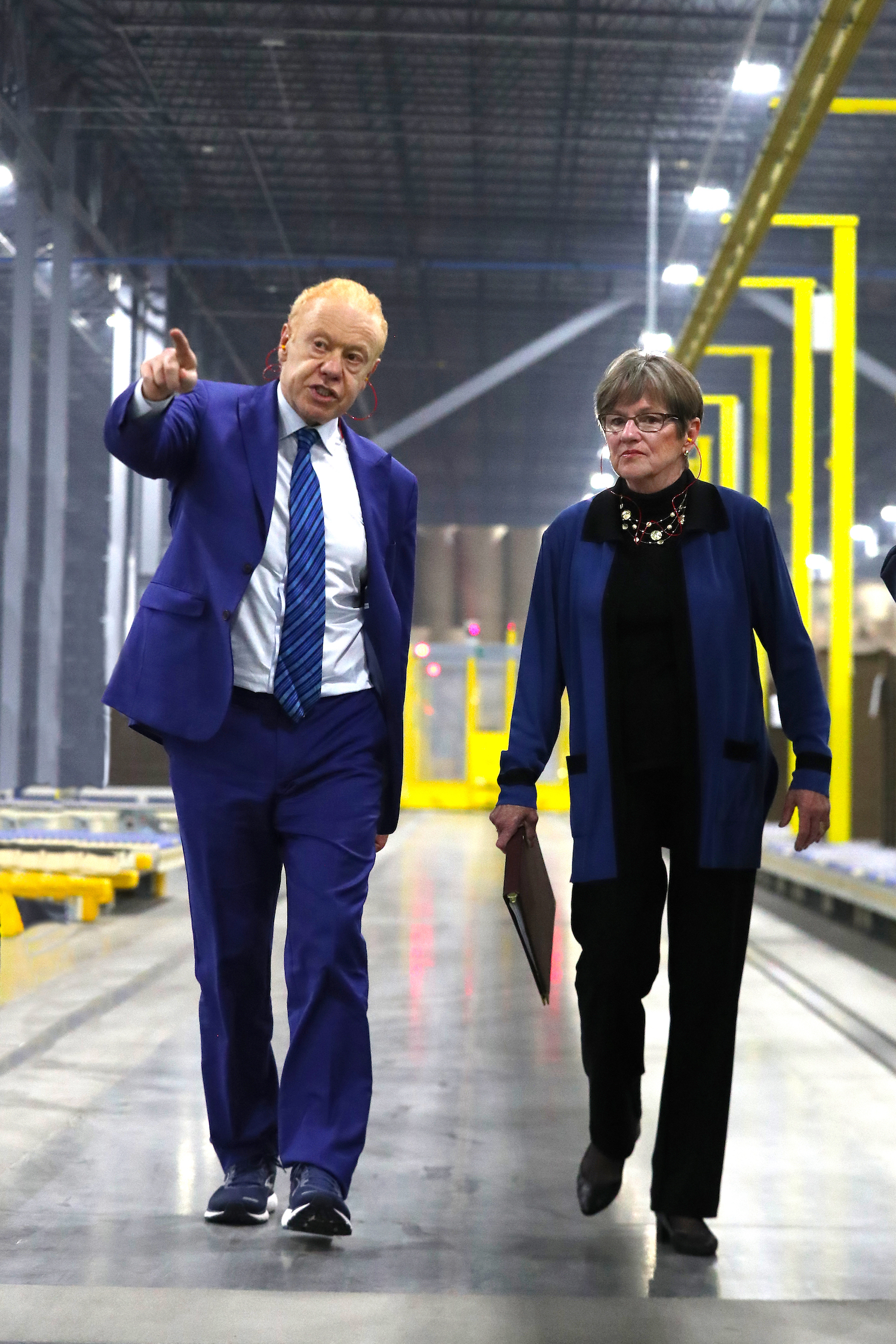
Kelly meeting with businessman Anthony Pratt, October 2022.

Kelly was critical of the Kansas experiment, the experimental Kansas budget of Governor Sam Brownback that led to cuts in schools, roads, and public safety. She would like to reverse those changes and pointed out that after there were major budget shortages she led a bipartisan effort to successfully balance the budget without increasing taxes.

In 2019, Kelly vetoed two Republican bills that would have cut state income taxes in Kansas. She said that the state could not afford the cuts, and that the Republican bill, which would have cut revenues by an estimated $245 million over a three-year period, would have precipitated a "senseless fiscal crisis" and created a budget deficit. Kelly's decision, as well as higher-than-expected state revenue intakes, led to the state beginning its 2020 budget year with $1.1 billion in cash reserves. She sought to use some of the reserves to pay down debt and make payments to the state pension system. In May 2022, she signed a bill into law that will gradually reduce the sales tax rate on food before eliminating it in 2025.

During the 2024 Kansas legislative session, Kelly vetoed multiple bills intended to cut taxes, including a bipartisan bill that passed the Kansas House unanimously, arguing that the bills were too generous to the wealthy and would create financial problems for the state within a few years.

==== COVID-19 responses ====
In response to the COVID-19 pandemic in the United States, Kelly, like other governors, took steps to halt the spread of the SARS-CoV-2 virus, which causes coronavirus disease 2019 (COVID-19). She declared a state of emergency on March 12, 2020, following the state's first COVID-19 death, and issued a 60-day ban on public gatherings of 50 or more people and a moratorium on utility shutoffs on March 16. On March 18, citing the unprecedented crisis, Kelly directed the end to all in-person K–12 classes for the remainder of the school year, making Kansas the first state to take that step. On March 23, to combat the virus's spread, she limited public gatherings to ten people. On March 28, amid increasing deaths and illnesses, Kelly issued a "stay at home" order that directed all residents to remain at home, except for travel for essential work, essential business (such as traveling to obtain medical care or groceries), and outdoor exercise with social distancing measures. Almost two dozen other states had already issued similar orders, and almost 75% of Kansas's population was already affected by similar orders from local officials, since 25 Kansas counties, including the most populous ones, already had stay-at-home orders in place. Kelly strongly criticized the Trump administration's slow response to the crisis and the federal failure to provide Kansas and other states with adequate supplies of personal protective equipment (such as masks, gloves, and gowns) and testing kits.

The Kansas City Star's editorial board criticized Kelly's rollout of the COVID-19 vaccine, writing, "Kansas seems to be uniquely underperforming, a recurring issue for Kelly and the administration she leads." But the board added that Kelly did not bear all the burden for the state's response shortcomings because Republican state legislators were insisting that individual counties exercise sole authority with respect to COVID-19 efforts. That resulted in a slapdash response when treatment and vaccinations became available. If the state was not sufficiently prepared for the pandemic, many counties were even less so, citing CDC data showing Kansas near the bottom of vaccinations per 100,000 residents. Members of the Kansas congressional delegation, including Sharice Davids, called on Kelly to do more to address the backlog of claimants at the Department of Labor seeking unemployment payments from federal programs aimed to help residents out of work due to the pandemic.

On November 16, 2020, Kelly renewed her call for the legislature to join her in the issuance of masking orders.

==== Executive order on religious gatherings ====
Because Kelly's orders on public gatherings applied to Easter Sunday celebrations in churches, the Republican-majority Legislative Coordinating Council (LCC), (Note: The LCC, established under Chapter 46, Kansas Statutes, consists of the presiding officers and party leaders of both houses of the Legislature.) a group of leaders of the Kansas Legislature, voted to revoke her order on a 5–2 party-line vote on April 9, 2020, asserting that the order violated the free exercise of religion. Republican Attorney General Derek Schmidt opposed Kelly's order, issuing a memorandum calling it a violation of the Kansas state law, and urged law enforcement not to enforce it. Kelly called this "shockingly irresponsible"; at the time, there had been more than a thousand confirmed COVID-19 cases, and dozens of confirmed COVID-19 deaths, in Kansas, and of 11 identified sources of contagion, three had come from recent religious gatherings. She challenged the LCC's decision in the Kansas Supreme Court. Following an expedited oral argument (conducted remotely via Zoom teleconference), the state Supreme Court unanimously reinstated Kelly's orders, concluding that her executive order was valid and that the LCC lacked the authority to overturn it.

A week later, in a separate case, U.S. District Judge John W. Broomes in Wichita issued a temporary restraining order blocking enforcement of Kelly's order as to two churches (one in Junction City, the other in Dodge City), contending that the restriction violated religious freedom and free speech rights. That case became moot after Kelly issued a new executive order with less restrictive COVID-19 rules effective on May 4, 2020, under an agreement that allowed the churches to hold larger in-person services but required social distancing.

==== Healthcare ====
As governor, Kelly pushed the Republican-controlled Kansas legislature to accept the Medicaid expansion under the Affordable Care Act, to provide health care coverage to up to 150,000 Kansans. A Medicaid expansion plan had passed the Kansas Legislature in 2017, but Brownback vetoed it. During every legislative session of her governorship, Kelly has proposed legislation that would expand Medicaid, but she has not yet succeeded. In 2025, the legislation is called the Healthcare Access for Working Kansans (HAWK) Act.

Kelly has also supported reforming KanCare so that more citizens have access to health insurance.

==== Human services ====
Kelly proposed combining the Department of Children and Family Services with the Department of Aging and Disability Services into a consolidated, integrated Department of Human Services.

In January 2020, Kelly called for major changes to the Osawatomie State Hospital, the long-troubled state psychiatric hospital that has faced scrutiny from federal regulators over security, safety, and treatment lapses. She has supported a plan for state funding for mental health crisis centers in the state.

==== Immigrant rights ====
Kelly has clashed with immigrants rights advocates, signing a Republican-backed bill in 2022 that was written by her eventual gubernatorial opponent, then state attorney general Derek Schmidt. The state law was written to prevent the implementation of a recently passed local law in Wyandotte County, which sought to enact a community identification card program intended to benefit immigrants, the formerly incarcerated, those experiencing homelessness, those aged out of the foster care system, and the elderly.

==== School funding ====
Kelly has largely reversed former governor Sam Brownback's education agenda since taking office in 2019. She has said that she would like to ensure Kansas schools are funded and focus on improving Kansas students' performance to be competitive with other parts of the country. For example, she would address the statewide teacher shortage and improve pay for educators. She would also like to expand early childhood programs and increase options for students pursuing higher education.

==== Social issues ====
In her first official act as governor, Kelly signed an executive order reinstating the employment discrimination protections for LGBT state workers that Governor Sam Brownback had eliminated in 2015.

Kelly opposed a Republican-proposed anti-abortion amendment to the Kansas Constitution in early 2020, saying it would return Kansas to the "dark ages". Amid acrimonious debate, the state House fell four votes short of the two-thirds majority required to put it on the state ballot. In 2022, she expressed her opposition to the 2022 Kansas abortion referendum that would have removed the right to an abortion from the state constitution. The amendment was defeated, with nearly 60% of voters rejecting it.

=== Term limits and successor ===
In November 2025—facing term limits that prevent her from running for reelection again—Kelly endorsed State Senator Ethan Corson for governor. However, Corson lost to Cindy Holscher in the Democratic primary. Holscher then won the 2026 election and is set to be sworn in as governor on January 11, 2027.

== Personal life ==
Kelly married physician Ted Daughety, a specialist in pulmonary and sleep disorders, in 1983. They moved to Topeka in 1986. They have two adult daughters. Kelly and Daughety divorced in 2024.

Kelly is Catholic.

== Other political activism ==
In 2023, Kelly launched Middle of the Road PAC in an effort to elect candidates.

== Electoral history ==
Kansas Gubernatorial election, 2022
Party	Candidate	Votes	%	±%
Democratic	Laura Kelly (incumbent); David Toland (incumbent)	499,849	49.54%	+1.53%
Republican	Derek Schmidt; Katie Sawyer	477,591	47.33%	+4.35%
Independent	Dennis Pyle; Kathleen Garrison	20,452	2.03%	N/A
Libertarian	Seth Cordell; Evan Laudick-Gains	11,106	1.10%	−0.80%
Total votes		1,008,998	100.0%	
Democratic hold				

Kansas gubernatorial Democratic primary, 2022
Party	Candidate	Votes	%
Democratic	Laura Kelly (incumbent); David Toland (incumbent)	270,968	93.84
Democratic	Richard Karnowski; Barry Franco	17,802	6.16
Total votes		288,770	100

Kansas Gubernatorial election, 2018
Party	Candidate	Votes	%	±%
Democratic	Laura Kelly	506,727	48.01%	
Republican	Kris Kobach	453,645	42.98%	
Independent	Greg Orman	68,590	6.50%	
Libertarian	Jeff Caldwell	20,020	1.9%	
Independent	Rick Kloos	6,584	0.6%	
Majority		53,082	5.03%	
Turnout		1,055,566		
Democratic gain from Republican		Swing	+2.2%	

Kansas gubernatorial Democratic primary, 2018
Party	Candidate	Votes	%	±%
Democratic	Laura Kelly	78,746	51.5%	
Democratic	Carl Brewer	30,693	20.1%	
Democratic	Josh Svaty	26,722	17.5%	
Democratic	Arden Andersen	12,845	8.4%	
Democratic	Jack Bergeson	3,850	2.5%	
Majority		48,053	31.4%	
Turnout		152,856		

Kansas Senate 18th district election, 2016
Party	Candidate	Votes	%
Democratic	Laura Kelly (incumbent)	15,007	51.6
Republican	Dave Jackson	14,076	48.4
Total votes		29,083	100.0
Democratic hold			

Kansas Senate 18th district election, 2012
Party	Candidate	Votes	%
Democratic	Laura Kelly (incumbent)	14,813	51.7
Republican	Dick Barta	13,833	48.3
Total votes		28,646	100.0
Democratic hold			

Kansas Senate 18th district election, 2008
Party	Candidate	Votes	%
Democratic	Laura Kelly (incumbent)	18,009	58.1
Republican	James Zeller	12,959	41.8
Total votes		30,968	100.0
Democratic hold			

Kansas Senate 18th district election, 2004
Primary election
Party	Candidate	Votes	%
Democratic	Laura Kelly	4,559	71.8
Democratic	D. Kent Hurn	1,793	28.2
Total votes		6,352	100.0
General election
Democratic	Laura Kelly	15,388	50.1
Republican	Dave Jackson (incumbent)	15,290	49.9
Total votes		30,678	100.0
Democratic gain from Republican			

== See also ==
- List of female governors in the United States

== Notes ==
Party political offices
Preceded by Paul Davis	Democratic nominee for Governor of Kansas; 2018, 2022	Succeeded by Cindy Holscher
Preceded by Tim Walz	Chair of the Democratic Governors Association; 2024–2025	Succeeded by Andy Beshear
Political offices
Preceded by Jeff Colyer	Governor of Kansas; 2019–present	Incumbent
U.S. order of precedence (ceremonial)
Preceded by JD Vance as Vice President	Order of precedence of the United States; Within Kansas	Succeeded by Mayor of city in which event is held
Preceded by JD Vance as Vice President	Order of precedence of the United States; Within Kansas	Succeeded by Otherwise Mike Johnson as Speaker of the House
Preceded by Tina Kotek as Governor of Oregon	Order of precedence of the United States; Outside Kansas	Succeeded by Patrick Morrisey as Governor of West Virginia
