= First ladies and gentlemen of Kansas =

Title of spouse of Kansas governor

First Gentleman of Kansas
- Incumbent; Vacant since October 2024
- Inaugural holder: Sara Tappan Doolittle Robinson
- Formation: February 9, 1861

First Lady or First Gentleman of Kansas is the title attributed to the spouses of the governors of the U.S. state of Kansas, especially from 1933. The most recent first gentleman is Ted Daughety, former husband of Governor Laura Kelly, who held the role from January 2019 to October 2024 when the couple divorced.

== Territorial first ladies ==
- The area that became Kansas was part of Louisiana Territory, later renamed Missouri Territory, until 1821, and unorganized until it became its own territory on May 30, 1854; see First Ladies and Gentlemen of Missouri for the period from 1805 to 1821.
- A small part of Kansas was once claimed as part of the Republic of Texas (see List of presidents of the Republic of Texas, and before that, was part of Mexico (see Spanish governors of New Mexico).

#	Name	Took office	Left office	Governor
1	Amalia Hutter	July 7, 1854	August 16, 1855	Andrew Horatio Reeder
2	Sarah Osbun	September 7, 1855	August 18, 1856	Wilson Shannon
3	Mary Bache	May 27, 1857	December 15, 1857	Robert J. Walker
4	Louise Rombach	December 1857	November 1858	James W. Denver
5	Eliza Scott	December 1858	December 1860	Samuel Medary

== First ladies and gentlemen of the State of Kansas ==
#	Name	Took office	Left office	Governor
1	Sara Tappan Doolittle Robinson	February 9, 1861	January 12, 1863	Charles L. Robinson
2	Rebecca Ann Canaday	January 12, 1863	January 9, 1865	Thomas Carney
3	Isabel Marshall Chase	January 9, 1865	November 4, 1868	Samuel J. Crawford
4	Ida King Leffingwell	November 4, 1868	January 11, 1869	Nehemiah Green
5	Charlotte Richardson Cutter	January 11, 1869	January 13, 1873	James M. Harvey
6	Julia Delehay	January 13, 1873	January 8, 1877	Thomas A. Osborn
7	Rosa Lyon	January 8, 1877	January 13, 1879	George T. Anthony
8	Susan J. Parker	January 13, 1879	January 8, 1883	John St. John
9	Elizabeth Rider	January 8, 1883	January 12, 1885	George Washington Glick
10	Ida Challiss	January 12, 1885	January 14, 1889	John A. Martin
11	Amanda Leonard	January 14, 1889	January 9, 1893	Lyman U. Humphrey
12	Ida Bishop	January 9, 1893	January 14, 1895	Lorenzo D. Lewelling
13	Caroline Jenkins Nash	January 14, 1895	January 11, 1897	Edmund N. Morrill
14	Sarah J. Boyd	January 11, 1897	January 9, 1899	John W. Leedy
15	Emma Lenora Hills	January 9, 1899	January 12, 1903	William E. Stanley
16	Ida Albert Weede	January 12, 1903	January 9, 1905	Willis J. Bailey
17	Sarah Louise Dickerson	January 9, 1905	January 11, 1909	Edward W. Hoch
18	Stella Hosteller	January 11, 1909	January 13, 1913	Walter R. Stubbs
19	Ora May Murray	January 13, 1913	January 11, 1915	George H. Hodges
20	Florence Crawford	January 11, 1915	January 13, 1919	Arthur Capper
21	Elsie Nuzman	January 13, 1919	January 8, 1923	Henry J. Allen
22	Mary Purdom	January 8, 1923	January 12, 1925	Jonathan M. Davis
23	Barbara Ellis	January 12, 1925	January 14, 1929	Ben S. Paulen
24	Minnie E. Hart	January 14, 1929	January 12, 1931	Clyde M. Reed
25	Theo Cobb	January 9, 1933	January 11, 1937	Alf Landon
26	Eula M. Biggs	January 11, 1937	January 9, 1939	Walter A. Huxman
27	Cliffe Dodd	January 9, 1939	January 11, 1943	Payne Ratner
28	Marie Thomsen	January 11, 1943	January 13, 1947	Andrew F. Schoeppel
29	Alice Fredrickson	January 13, 1947	November 28, 1950	Frank Carlson
30	Elizabeth Blair Sutton	November 28, 1950	January 8, 1951	Frank L. Hagaman
31	Marcella Tillmans	January 8, 1951	January 10, 1955	Edward F. Arn
32	Leadell Schneider	January 10, 1955	January 3, 1957	Fred Hall
33	Cora Hedrick	January 3, 1957	January 14, 1957	John McCuish
34	Mary Virginia Blackwell	January 14, 1957	January 9, 1961	George Docking
35	Arlene Auchard	January 9, 1961	January 11, 1961	John Anderson Jr.
36	Hazel Bowles	January 11, 1965	January 9, 1967	William H. Avery
37	Meredith Gear	January 9, 1967	January 13, 1975	Robert Docking
38	Olivia Fisher	January 13, 1975	January 8, 1979	Robert F. Bennett
39	Ramona Hawkinson Carlin	January 8, 1979	November 15, 1980	John W. Carlin
40	Karen Carlin	1981	1985	John W. Carlin
41	Patti Rooney	January 12, 1987	January 14, 1991	Mike Hayden
42	Spencer Finney	January 14, 1991	January 9, 1995	Joan Finney
43	Linda Graves	January 9, 1995	January 13, 2003	Bill Graves
44	K. Gary Sebelius	January 13, 2003	April 28, 2009	Kathleen Sebelius
45	Stacy Abbott	April 28, 2009	January 10, 2011	Mark Parkinson
46	Mary Brownback	January 10, 2011	January 31, 2018	Sam Brownback
47	Ruth Colyer	January 31, 2018	January 14, 2019	Jeff Colyer
48	Ted Daughety	January 14, 2019	October 2024	Laura Kelly

== See also ==
- List of governors of Kansas
