= Don Svaty =

American politician (born 1943)

Member of the Kansas House of Representatives from the 108th district
- In office August 5, 2009 – January 10, 2011
- Preceded by: Joshua Svaty
- Succeeded by: Steven C. Johnson

Personal details
- Born: December 13, 1943 (age 82)
- Party: Democratic
- Spouse: Niki Svaty
- Children: Josh Svaty
- Occupation: Farmer and Stockman

Don Svaty (born December 13, 1943) is a former member of the Kansas House of Representatives, representing the 108th district as a Democrat. On August 5, 2009, he succeeded his son, Joshua Svaty, who had been appointed as Kansas Secretary of Agriculture by Governor Mark Parkinson.

Don is a farmer and stockman from Ellsworth County, Kansas.

== Committee membership ==
- Agriculture and Natural Resources, Ranking Minority Member
- Energy and Environmental Policy, Member
- Energy and Utilities, Member
