= Ted Daughety =

American pulmonologist-immunologist

First Gentleman of Kansas
- In role January 14, 2019 – October 2024
- Governor: Laura Kelly
- Preceded by: Ruth Colyer (as First Lady)
- Succeeded by: Greg Holscher (elect, 2027)

Personal details
- Born: July 19, 1949 (age 77)
- Spouse: Laura Kelly (m. 1983; div. 2024)
- Children: 2
- Education: Baylor University; University of Texas Southwestern Medical Center
- Occupation: Pulmonologist-immunologist

Ted W. Daughety (born July 19, 1949) is a retired American pulmonologist-immunologist specialized in sleeping and breathing disorders. He was the first gentleman of Kansas as the spouse of Governor Laura Kelly from January 2019 until their divorce in October 2024.

== Education ==
Daughety graduated from Baylor University. He earned a M.D. from the University of Texas Southwestern Medical Center and completed a residency at the Medical University of South Carolina. He conducted a fellowship at the University of California, San Francisco.

== Career ==
Daughety worked for the National Jewish Hospital and Saint Joseph Hospital in Denver. He held various academic appointments with the San Francisco VA Medical Center and the University of Colorado Health Sciences Center. In 1986, he joined the Salina Clinic as a pulmonary specialist and immunologist. Daughety specializes in the diagnosis and treatment of breathing disorders including asthma and bronchitis. On February 1, 2019, Daughety closed his outreach clinic at Neman Regional Health and resigned as the sleep disorder center medical director. He had retired as a pulmonologist in April 2020. During the COVID-19 pandemic in Kansas, he resumed work at a screening clinic.

== Personal life ==
On January 14, 2019, Daughety became the third first gentleman of Kansas as the spouse of Governor Laura Kelly. They married in 1983. They moved into the Cedar Crest residence. Daughety and Kelly have two daughters. Kelly and Daughety divorced in October 2024.
