= Bátor Tábor Foundation =

Hungarian nonprofit organisation

The Bátor Tábor Foundation is a Hungarian nonprofit organisation that provides recreational therapy programs for children with serious or chronic illnesses and their families. Founded in 2001 by healthcare and child psychology professionals, the foundation operates residential camps, hospital outreach and community programs in Hungary and neighbouring central European countries. The organisation has served people from Hungary, Poland, Slovakia, and the Czech Republic. Bátor Tábor has received coverage from Hungarian media outlets. A report by HEOL.hu noted that tens of thousands of children and family members have participated in its programs since its establishment in 2001. The foundation's methodology has also been examined in peer-reviewed journals.
