= Senator Huntington (disambiguation) =

Jabez W. Huntington (1788–1847) was a U.S. Senator from Connecticut. Senator Huntington may also refer to:

- Abel Huntington (1777–1858), New York State Senate
- George Huntington (politician, born 1796) (1796–1866), New York State Senate
- Samuel Huntington (Ohio politician) (1765–1817), Ohio State Senate
- Terrie Huntington (born 1949), Kansas State Senate
