= David Adkins (Kansas politician) =

American politician

Member of the Kansas State Senate from the 7th District
- In office 2001–2005
- Preceded by: Audrey Langworthy
- Succeeded by: David Wysong

Member of the Kansas House of Representatives from the 28th District
- In office 1993–2001
- Preceded by: Kerry Patrick
- Succeeded by: Doug Patterson

Personal details
- Born: March 11, 1961
- Party: Republican
- Education: University of Kansas (BA, JD)

David Adkins (born March 11, 1961) is an American attorney and former member of the Kansas State Legislature. As of 2023, he leads The Council of State Governments as its ninth executive director and CEO.

== Biography ==
David Adkins serves as Executive Director and CEO of The Council of State Governments (CSG), the nation’s only nonpartisan organization serving all three branches of state government. Founded in 1933, CSG brings together state leaders from across the country to share ideas and develop policy solutions that put the best ideas into practice.

During his 12 years in the Kansas Legislature, serving in both the House and Senate, Adkins was elected chair of CSG Midwest and named a CSG Henry Toll Fellow, the nation’s premier leadership program for state officials. In the legislature, he chaired committees on appropriations, taxation, juvenile crime, higher education and reapportionment.

Adkins combines policy expertise with a deep belief that states remain America’s best laboratories for solving big challenges.

Prior to joining CSG, Adkins was a partner in a law firm, founding executive director of a community foundation and vice chancellor for external affairs at the University of Kansas Medical Center.

He earned degrees in political science and law from the University of Kansas, where he became the first KU student named a Harry S. Truman Scholar.

Adkins is a fellow of the National Academy of Public Administration and serves in advisory and leadership roles for organizations advancing the common good at the state and national levels.
