= Ethan Corson =

American politician and attorney

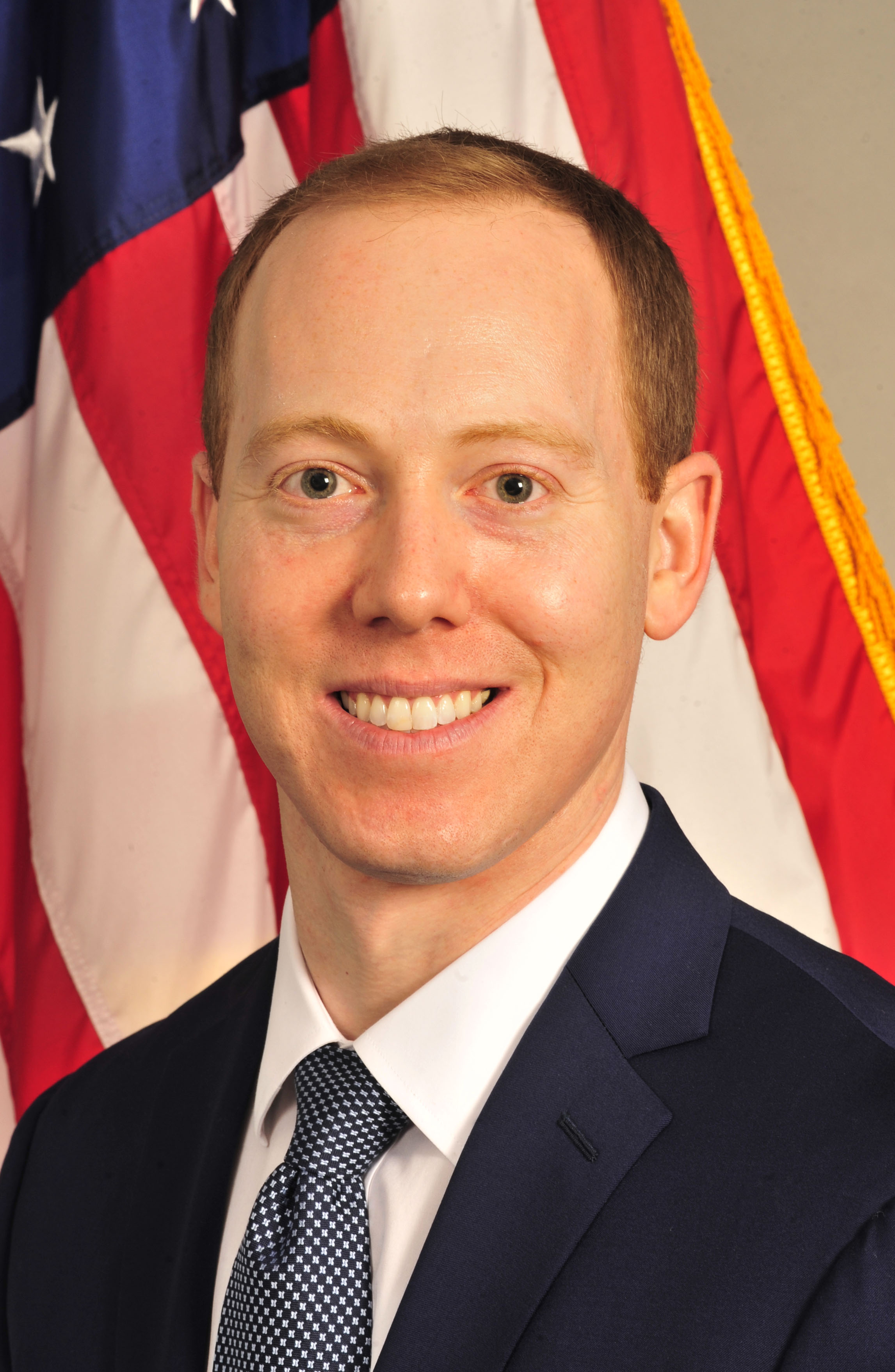

Member of the Kansas Senate from the 7th district
- Incumbent
- Assumed office January 11, 2021
- Preceded by: Barbara Bollier

Personal details
- Born: May 28, 1982 (age 44)
- Party: Democratic
- Spouse: Jenna Brofsky
- Children: 2
- Education: Garden City Community College (attended); Washington University (BS, JD)

Ethan Corson (born 1982) is an American politician and attorney who represents the 7th district in the Kansas Senate. Elected in 2020, he assumed office on January 11, 2021. A member of the Democratic Party, he ran for governor of Kansas in the 2026 election, but lost to Cindy Holscher in the Democratic primary.

== Early life and education ==
Corson was raised in Johnson County, Kansas, and attended Shawnee Mission South High School. After graduating from high school, Corson played baseball at Garden City Community College. He earned a Bachelor of Science degree in political science, journalism, and communication from the Washington University in St. Louis, followed by a Juris Doctor from the Washington University School of Law.

== Career ==
After graduating from law school, Corson worked as an attorney in Washington, D.C., and later served as a senior advisor to Penny Pritzker in the United States Department of Commerce. He also served as chief of staff of the International Trade Administration and director of the Office of the Executive Secretariat in the Commerce Department. Corson returned to Kansas to serve as the executive director of the Kansas Democratic Party. In 2019, he was a visiting fellow at the Robert J. Dole Institute of Politics at the University of Kansas.

After Barbara Bollier declined to seek re-election to the Kansas Senate and instead ran in the 2020 United States Senate election, Corson announced his candidacy to succeed her. Corson did not face an opponent in the Democratic primary and defeated Republican nominee Laura McConwell in the November general election.

On July 22, 2025, Corson announced his candidacy for governor of Kansas in the 2026 election. In November 2025, Governor Laura Kelly — who is ineligible to seek reelection due to term limits — endorsed Corson, citing similar views and "middle-of-the-road" political stances. He came in second place, losing the nomination to State Senator Cindy Holscher.

2021-2022 Kansas Senate committee assignments

- Judiciary
- Utilities
- Assessment and Taxation
- Legislative Post Audit Committee
- Joint Committee on Administrative Rules and Regulations
- Joint Committee on Corrections and Juvenile Justice Oversight

== Personal life ==
Corson is married to Jenna Brofsky, an attorney and member of the Fairway, Kansas City Council. They have two sons.
