= K. Gary Sebelius =

American judge

Magistrate Judge of the United States District Court for the District of Kansas
- In office 2003 – February 20, 2019

First Gentleman of Kansas
- In role January 13, 2003 – April 28, 2009
- Governor: Kathleen Sebelius
- Preceded by: Linda Graves
- Succeeded by: Stacy Parkinson

Personal details
- Born: Keith Gary Sebelius; November 8, 1949 (age 76) Norton, Kansas, U.S.
- Spouse: Kathleen Sebelius (m. 1974)
- Children: 2
- Parent: Keith Sebelius (father)
- Relatives: John J. Gilligan (father-in-law)
- Education: Kansas State University (BA); Georgetown University (JD)

Keith Gary Sebelius (born November 8, 1949) is an American lawyer who was a magistrate judge of the United States District Court for the District of Kansas from 2003 to 2019. He is the husband of former United States Secretary of Health and Human Services Kathleen Sebelius and served as the First Gentleman of Kansas from 2003 to 2009, while his wife was governor.

== Early life and education ==
Sebelius was born in Norton, Kansas, the son of Elizabeth Adeline (née Roberts) and Keith George Sebelius, a United States congressman from Kansas. Sebelius earned a bachelor's degree magna cum laude from Kansas State University in 1971 and a J.D. degree from Georgetown University Law Center in 1974.

== Professional career ==
Before becoming a judge, Sebelius had a long career as a lawyer in Topeka, Kansas. He worked as an associate at the law firm of Eidson, Lewis, Porter & Haynes from 1974 until 1979, and then served as a partner at the firm from 1979 until 1989. From 1989 until 1993, Sebelius was a partner at the firm of Davis, Wright, Unrein, Hummer & McCallister. Sebelius then worked as a partner at the Topeka law firm Wright, Henson, Somers, Sebelius, Clark & Baker from 1993 until 2003. During his time in private practice, Sebelius became best known for defending the Topeka Board of Education in the reopened Brown v. Board of Education case in federal court.

== Failed nomination to district court ==
On June 6, 2000, President Bill Clinton nominated Sebelius to be a judge on the United States District Court for the District of Kansas to fill the vacancy created by the decision by Judge George Thomas Van Bebber to take senior status. However, with the United States Senate controlled by Republicans, many of Clinton's judicial nominations languished. In particular, Sebelius' nomination was reported to have been held up by Kansas Sen. Sam Brownback. President George W. Bush later successfully appointed Julie A. Robinson to the seat to which Sebelius had been nominated.

== Work as a U.S. magistrate judge ==
On August 16, 2002, the judges on the United States District Court for the District of Kansas appointed Sebelius to an eight-year term as a United States magistrate judge. Sebelius began hearing cases in February 2003 and was formally sworn in on June 11, 2003. He retired from the bench on February 20, 2019.

== Personal life ==
Sebelius married his wife, Kathleen Sebelius on New Year's Eve 1974. They have two sons.
