= Barbara Bollier =

American politician (born 1958)

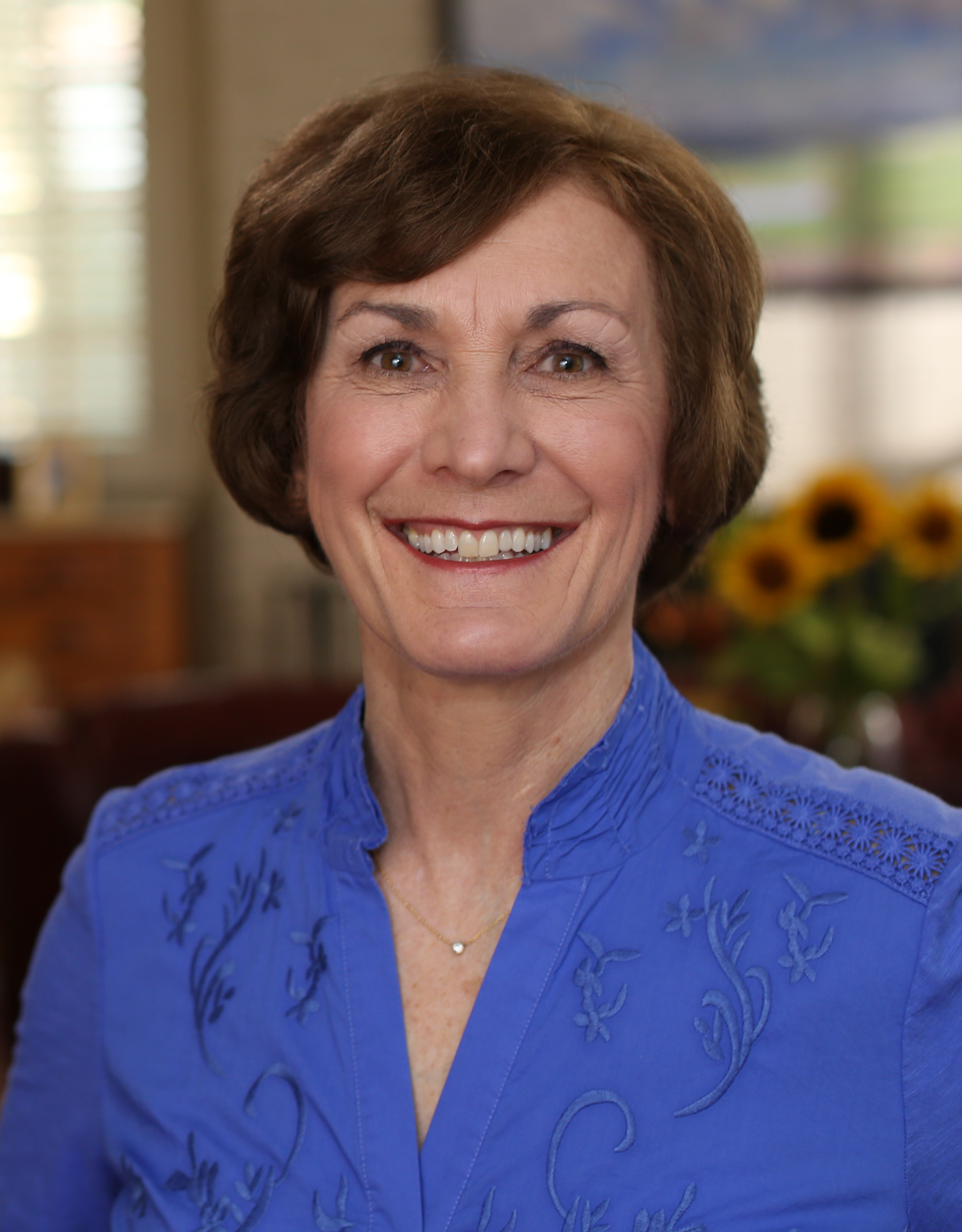
- Bollier in 2019

Member of the Kansas Senate from the 7th district
- In office January 9, 2017 – January 11, 2021
- Preceded by: Kay Wolf
- Succeeded by: Ethan Corson

Member of the Kansas House of Representatives
- In office January 5, 2010 – January 9, 2017
- Preceded by: Terrie Huntington
- Succeeded by: Jerry Stogsdill
- Constituency: 25th district (2010–2013); 21st district (2013–2017)

Personal details
- Born: Barbara Goolsbee; January 13, 1958 (age 68) Galveston, Texas, U.S.
- Party: Democratic (since 2018)
- Other political affiliations: Republican (before 2018)
- Spouse: Rene Bollier
- Children: 2, including Bobby
- Education: University of Kansas (BGS, MD)

Barbara Goolsbee Bollier (born January 13, 1958) is an American physician and politician. From 2017 to 2021, she was a member of the Kansas Senate representing the 7th district, which includes Mission Hills, Kansas in Johnson County. Bollier is a member of the Democratic Party, having left the Republican Party in 2018. Bollier was the Democratic nominee in the 2020 United States Senate election in Kansas, losing in the general election to Republican congressman Roger Marshall.

== Early life and education ==
Barbara Goolsbee was born in Galveston, Texas, on January 13, 1958, while her father, Robert L. Goolsbee (1931–2015), was in his medical residency, and her mother, Betty, was a nurse, whom Goolsbee had met during an internship in Kansas City, Missouri. She grew up in Fairway, Kansas, and Mission Hills, Kansas.

After receiving an undergraduate degree at the University of Kansas, Bollier earned a Doctor of Medicine degree from the University of Kansas School of Medicine. Her residency at Baylor College of Medicine was in anesthesiology; her father too had attended Baylor University.

== Medical career ==
After earning her M.D., Bollier joined her father's practice at Surgicenter of Kansas City.

Bollier retired from medicine in 1999. She then began to volunteer with the Center for Practical Bioethics and became active with the Shawnee Mission Education Foundation Board.

== Political career ==
=== Kansas House of Representatives ===
Bollier's legislative career began in 2010 when Republican precinct committee members appointed her to replace Terrie Huntington, who had been appointed to the Kansas Senate.

From 2010 to 2012, Bollier represented the 25th district as a Republican in the Kansas House of Representatives. She represented the 21st House district from 2013 to 2017.

Bollier did not have a Republican primary challenger in 2010 or 2012. In 2014 she faced Neil Melton, who challenged her from the right. Bollier won 59 percent to 41 percent.

=== Kansas State Senate ===
In May 2016, Bollier ran for the Kansas Senate 7th district after state Senator Kay Wolf announced that she was retiring. Bollier won the seat by defeating Democrat Megan England with 22,439 votes (54.3%) to 18,884 votes (45.6%).

In July 2018, Kansas Senate President Susan Wagle removed Bollier as the Vice Chair of the Senate Public Health and Welfare Committee after she endorsed Democrat Tom Niermann's campaign for Congress. In the November 2018 election, Bollier supported the Democratic candidate for governor Laura Kelly over the Republican candidate, Secretary of State Kris Kobach.

On December 12, 2018, Bollier changed her party affiliation to the Democratic Party, saying: "Morally, the party is not going where my compass resides. I'm looking forward to being in a party that represents the ideals that I do, including Medicaid expansion and funding our K–12 schools." Bollier said that the "breaking point" had been the Kansas Republican Party's inclusion of anti-transgender language in its platform. Bollier was one of three Kansas legislators to switch from the Republican Party to the Democratic Party in December 2018; the other two were state Representative Stephanie Clayton and state Senator Dinah Sykes.

=== 2020 U.S. Senate election ===
On October 16, 2019, Bollier announced that she would run in the 2020 election for the United States Senate seat being vacated by the retiring Pat Roberts. The next day, former United States Attorney for Kansas Barry Grissom dropped out of the race and endorsed Bollier. Grissom's withdrawal from the race came despite his having raised almost half a million dollars in contributions during the previous quarter. His departure left Bollier as the party's clear frontrunner in the primary. She won the Democratic primary on August 4, 2020 with 87.5% of the vote. In the general election, she faced the Republican nominee, 1st District Congressman Roger Marshall, who defeated Kansas Secretary of State Kris Kobach in the Republican primary.

Bollier's Senate candidacy was endorsed by former Democratic Governor Kathleen Sebelius. The Sebelius endorsement came after Sebelius referenced Bollier's history of almost a decade of consistent support for fully funding schools, Medicaid Expansion, and the repeal of what she called former Governor Sam Brownback's "devastating tax experiment".

On September 1, 2020, she published a list of 75 Republican current and former Kansas officeholders who supported her campaign. Bollier was also endorsed by Nancy Kassebaum, a Republican former U.S. senator. During her 2020 campaign, Bollier called for defending and expanding the Affordable Care Act. She does not support Medicare for All. Bollier lost to Marshall by a 12 point margin.

== Personal life ==
While in medical school, Bollier met her husband Rene Bollier, a family medicine physician in Kansas City. Their son Bobby Bollier is an American professional swimmer who was a 14-time NCAA All-American while at Stanford University before attending George Washington University Law School.

== Electoral history ==
=== 2020 ===
Democratic primary results
Party	Candidate	Votes	%
Democratic	Barbara Bollier	168,759	85.34%
Democratic	Robert Tillman	28,997	14.66%
Total votes		197,756	100.00%

United States Senate election in Kansas, 2020
Party	Candidate	Votes	%	±%
Republican	Roger Marshall	727,962	53.22%	+0.07%
Democratic	Barbara Bollier	571,530	41.79%	N/A
Libertarian	Jason Buckley	68,263	4.99%	+0.67
Total votes		1,367,755	100.00%	

=== 2016 ===
Kansas State Senate, District 7 General Election, 2016
Party	Candidate	Votes	%
Republican	Barbara Bollier	22,439	54.30%
Democratic	Megan England	18,884	45.70%
Total votes		41,323	100.0%
Republican hold			

Party political offices
Preceded by Chad Taylor; Withdrew	Democratic nominee for U.S. Senator from Kansas (Class 2); 2020	Succeeded by Adam Hamilton
