= Doug Patterson =

American politician

Member of the Kansas House of Representatives from the 28th district
- In office January 2001 – January 10, 2005
- Preceded by: David Adkins
- Succeeded by: Pat Colloton

Personal details
- Born: June 13, 1948 (age 78) Kansas City, Kansas
- Party: Republican
- Spouse: Dorothy Patterson

Doug Patterson (born June 13, 1948) is an American politician who served in the Kansas House of Representatives as a Republican from the 28th district from 2001 to 2005.
