= Kansas Department of Agriculture, Division of Water Resources =

State agency in Kansas, United States

Division of Water Resources
- The Great Seal of the State of Kansas

Agency overview
- Formed: 1927
- Headquarters: 1320 Research Park Drive, Manhattan, Kansas
- Agency executive: Earl Lewis, Chief Engineer
- Parent agency: Kansas Department of Agriculture
- Website: agriculture.ks.gov/water

The Division of Water Resources within the Kansas Department of Agriculture governs the use and allocation of the state's water resources; regulates the construction of dams, levees and other changes to streams; represents Kansas on its four interstate river compacts; and coordinates the National Flood Insurance Program in Kansas. These responsibilities are accomplished through the administration of 30 state laws, including the Kansas Water Appropriation Act, Groundwater Management District Act, Obstructions in Streams, and the Levee Law.

The Division of Water Resources is one of several state agencies managing the state's water resources. Its role is principally regulatory. Other agencies and their roles associated with water include the Kansas Department of Health and Environment (water quality regulation), Kansas Water Office (water planning and policy), and the Division of Conservation (soil and water conservation projects).

The chief engineer leads the Division of Water Resources. Earl Lewis has served as chief engineer since 2020, being the sixth chief engineer since the division's inception. The Division of Water Resources is organized around three programs: Water Appropriation, Water Structures, and Water Management Services. The Division of Water Resources is headquartered in Manhattan, Kansas, with field office locations in Topeka, Stafford, Stockton, and Garden City.

== History ==
=== 1927–1951 ===
Kansas interstate river compacts

The Division of Water Resources was created in 1927, which effectively consolidated the Kansas Water Commission of 1917 and the Division of Irrigation of 1919. George S. Knapp, who had been appointed state irrigation commissioner, became the first chief engineer in 1927. Under his 32 years of service, various laws were enacted, including the Levee Law (1929), Obstructions in Streams (1929), Water Storage Law (1941), and the Kansas Water Appropriation Act (1945). Also signed at this time were the Republican River Compact (1943) and the Arkansas River Compact (1949).

=== 1951–1972 ===
In 1951, Robert V. Smrha became the second chief engineer, and served for 21 years. Under his administration there were major amendments to the Kansas Water Appropriation Act in 1957 that addressed water right changes and filing requirements. In addition, the Kansas-Oklahoma Arkansas River Compact (1966) and the Big Blue River Compact (1971) were signed. In 1972 the Groundwater Management District Act was enacted.

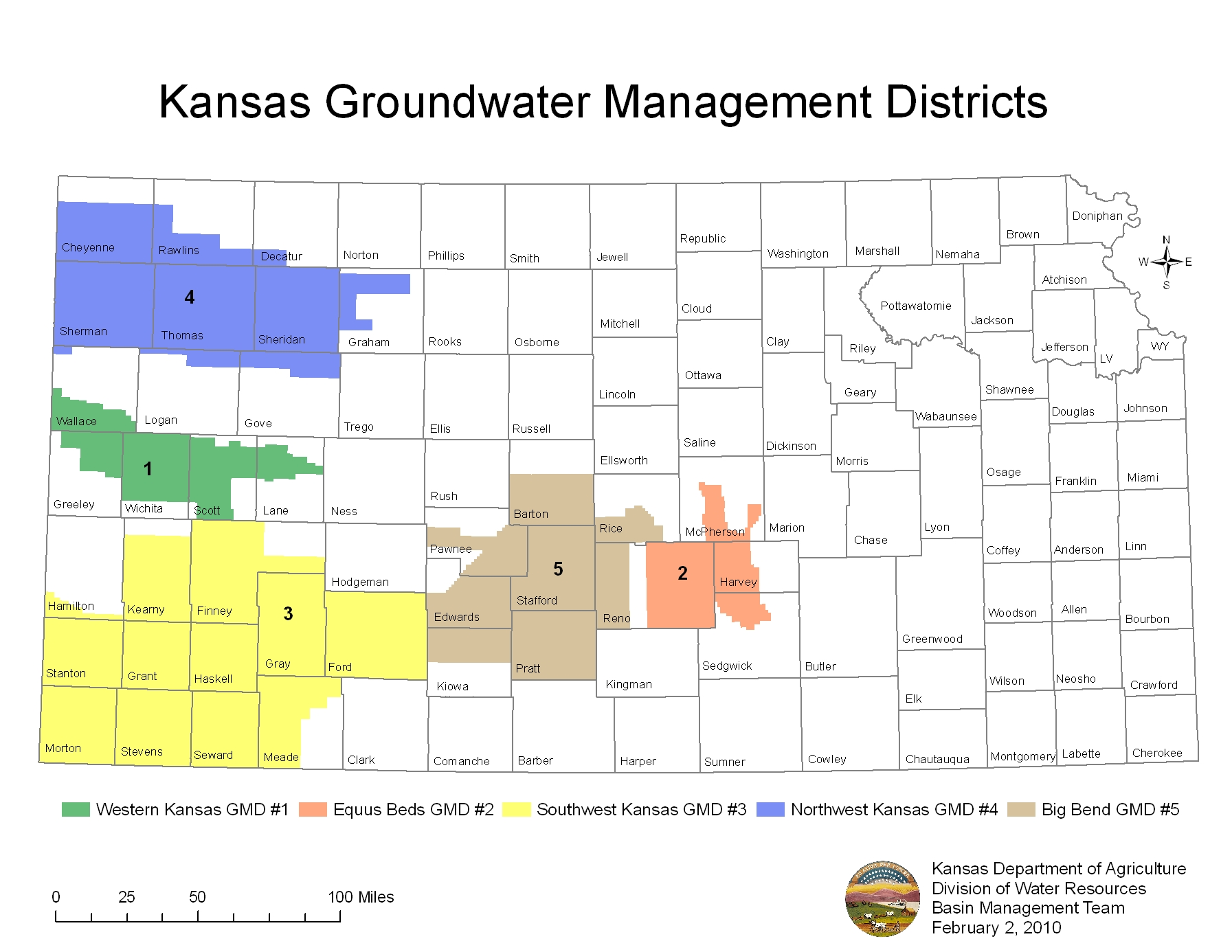
Kansas groundwater Mmanagement districts

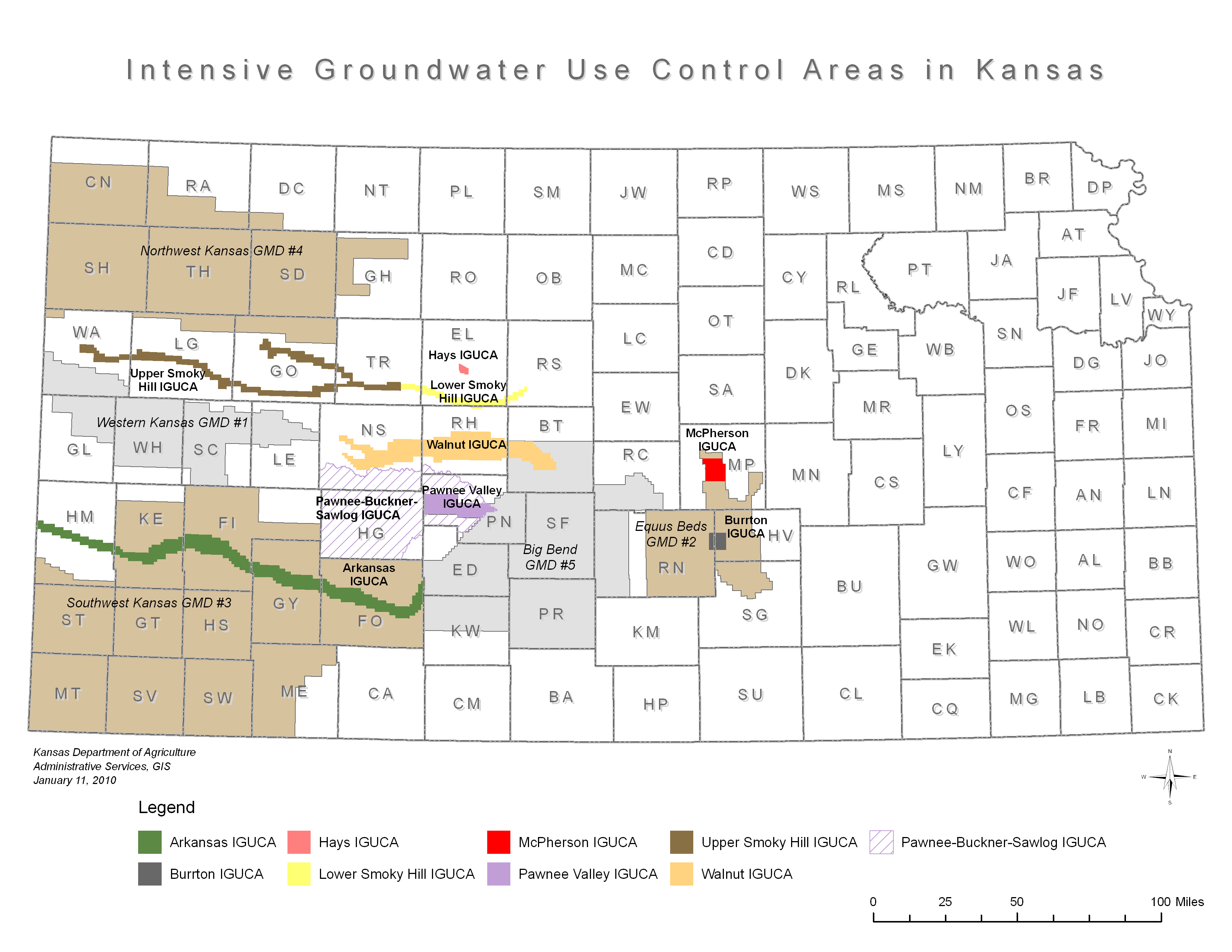
Intensive groundwater use control areas in Kansas

=== 1972–1983 ===
Guy E. Gibson was the third chief engineer, and served from 1972 to 1983. Under Gibson, Groundwater Management District Numbers 1, 2, 3, 4, and 5 were formed in Kansas from 1973 to 1976. Major amendments to the Groundwater Management District Act occurred in 1978, which added a process to allow for the creation of intensive groundwater use control areas. This addition to the statutes gave the chief engineer authority to implement more comprehensive corrective control provisions for water supply protection when local conditions require it or by the request of local stakeholders. Intensive groundwater use control areas were designated in McPherson in 1980 and the Pawnee River Valley in 1981. In addition, the enactment of the Water Plan Storage Act (1974) and the Water Transfer Act (1983) occurred under Gibson's administration.

=== 1983–2007 ===
In 1983, David L. Pope became the fourth chief engineer and served for 24 years. Over his tenure, extensive rules and regulations were developed and adopted under the Kansas Water Appropriation Act, Obstructions in Streams, and the Levee Law. He also designated additional intensive groundwater use control areas in Burrton (1984), Lower Smoky Hill River Valley (1984), Hays (1985), Arkansas River Valley (1986), Upper Smoky Hill River Valley (1988), and Walnut Creek (1992). In addition, Kansas v. Colorado was filed in 1985 to enforce terms of the Arkansas River Compact. In 1998, Kansas v. Nebraska and Colorado also filed to enforce terms of the Republican River Compact. The Final Settlement Stipulation of the Republican River Compact occurred in 2003. For the Arkansas River Compact violations, damages exceeding $35 million were paid to Kansas in 2005–2006. Other milestones under Pope's administration included the enactment of the Water Assurance Program Act (1986), Floodplain Zoning Ordinances Act (1991), and the Water Banking Act (2001).

=== 2007–present ===
The present chief engineer, David Barfield, initiated the enforcement of the Republican River Compact Settlement in 2007 and concluded the Kansas v. Colorado litigation enforcing the Arkansas River Compact in 2009 in favor of Kansas. He has worked to increase the development of groundwater modeling to analyze hydrologic conditions and for use as a tool to support decisions in water resource management. Barfield has ongoing dialogues with the groundwater management districts and stakeholders regarding options to address areas with over appropriation of water resources, many of which are located in the Ogallala aquifer.

== Programs ==
- Water Appropriation – Administers the Kansas Water Appropriation Act and rules and regulations pertaining to the management of water resources. This program issues permits to appropriate water, changes to existing water rights, regulates water use, and maintains records of all water rights in the state.
- Water Structures – Regulates, stream modifications, levees and floodplain fills for the protection of life, property and public safety; also provides technical assistance and coordination to local communities participating in the National Flood Insurance Program.
- Water Management Services – Provides technical service and data management and support to agency water programs. Consists of the following sub-programs:

- Interstate Water Issues – Assists the chief engineer in his responsibilities related to ensure Kansas fulfills its obligations and receives the full benefits under Kansas four interstate water compacts: the Kansas-Colorado Arkansas River, Big Blue River, Kansas-Oklahoma Arkansas, and the Republican River.

- Basin Management Team – Addresses water resource issues identified in the Kansas State Water Plan by developing water management strategies. Basin Management Team staff is involved in groundwater modeling, data analysis and report writing activities for project areas in Kansas.
