= Jerry Lunn =

American politician

Member of the Kansas House of Representatives from the 28th district
- In office January 14, 2013 – January 9, 2017
- Preceded by: Pat Colloton
- Succeeded by: Joy Koesten

Personal details
- Born: March 30, 1951 (age 75)
- Party: Republican
- Spouse: Tracy Lunn
- Children: 1
- Profession: Consultant, businessman

Jerry Lunn (born March 30, 1951) is an American politician. He has served as a Republican member for the 28th district in the Kansas House of Representatives since 2013. In 2016, the American Conservative Union gave him a 93% lifetime rating.
