= David Wysong =

American politician

Member of the Kansas Senate from the 7th district
- In office January 10, 2005 – December 13, 2009
- Preceded by: David Adkins
- Succeeded by: Terrie Huntington

Personal details
- Born: March 8, 1949 (age 77) Kansas City, Missouri, U.S.
- Party: Republican
- Spouse: Kathryn
- Children: 2
- Education: University of Kansas (BS)

David C. Wysong (born March 8, 1949) is a former Republican member of the Kansas Senate for the 7th district. He was first elected in 2004. He resigned in December 2009 and was replaced by Terrie Huntington.

Wysong is a Roman Catholic. He was born in Kansas City, Missouri. He received his bachelor's degree in journalism from the University of Kansas in 1972.

By 1979 he was running an advertising agency and in 1990 he became president of Wysong Capital Management. He entered politics in 1996 serving on the city council of Mission Hills, Kansas that year. He was elected to a term as a member of the Johnson County board of commissioners that year as well.

Wysong and his wife Kathy are the parents of two children.

== Issue positions ==
See: David Wysong issue positions on Project Vote Smart

== Committee assignments ==
Wysong serves on these legislative committees:

- Commerce (chair)
- Joint Committee on Economic Development (vice-chair)
- Ethics and Elections
- Public Health and Welfare
- Ways and Means

== Sponsored legislation ==
Recent sponsored bills by Sen. Wysong include:

- A bill regarding increased investments by the State
- A bill imposing restrictions for raising retailers' sales tax
- and multiple bills for regulating insurance

== Major Donors ==
Some of the top contributors to Wysong's 2008 campaign, according to the National Institute on Money in State Politics:

Steve Glassman, Gary Remley, Fred Couslon, Linda T. Watson, Missouri Bank, and others

Finance, insurance, and real estate companies were his largest donor group.
