= Pat Colloton =

American politician (born 1944)

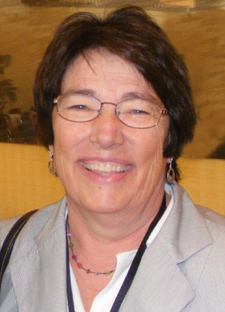

Member of the Kansas House of Representatives from the 28th district
- In office January 10, 2005 – January 14, 2013
- Preceded by: Doug Patterson
- Succeeded by: Jerry Lunn

Personal details
- Born: September 18, 1944 (age 81) Chicago, Illinois, U.S.
- Party: Republican
- Spouse: Patrick Colloton
- Children: 2
- Education: University of Wisconsin; University of Wisconsin Law School (JD)

Pat Colloton (born September 18, 1944) is a former Republican member of the Kansas House of Representatives, representing the 28th district. She served from 2004 to 2013.

Colloton, who has worked as an attorney since 1970, received her Bachelor's in Chemistry and Psychology from the University of Wisconsin, and her JD from UW Law School.

Prior to her election to the House, Colloton served as an alternative delegate to the Republican National Convention in 2004, and a delegate to the Kansas Republican Party Convention in 2003. She was also the Chair of the organizing committee for the Johnson County Republican Committee from 2003 to 2004. In 2013, she was appointed as the Assistant Attorney General of Kansas and tasked with leading the Anti-Human Trafficking Unit, as well as chairing the Human Trafficking Advisory Board, created in 2010.

Colloton has been active in a number of local organizations and is currently a member of the Leawood Chamber of Commerce, Lions Club, Rotary, Women's Club, and the Johnson County Bar and a member of the Kansas Sentencing Commission.

== Committee membership ==
- Corrections and Juvenile Justice (Chair)
- Joint Committee on Corrections and Juvenile Justice Oversight (Chair)
- Judiciary
- Human Trafficking Advisory Board (Chair)

== Major Donors ==
The top 5 donors to Colloton's 2008 campaign are mostly professional organizations:

- 1. Kansans for Lifesaving Cures $1,000
- 2. Kansas Insurance Agents $1,000
- 3. Kansas National Education Assoc $1,000
- 4. Kansas Assoc of Realtors $900
- 5. Kansas Bankers Assoc $800
