= Adrian Polansky =

American politician (born 1950)

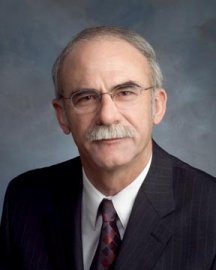

Executive Director of the Kansas Farm Service Agency
- Incumbent
- Assumed office July 14, 2009
- Preceded by: Bill R. Fuller
- In office 1993–2001

Kansas Secretary of Agriculture
- In office February 13, 2003 – July 14, 2009
- Appointed by: Kathleen Sebelius
- Succeeded by: Joshua Svaty

Personal details
- Party: Democratic
- Spouse: Kristine Polansky

Adrian Polansky (born c. 1950) was appointed secretary of the Kansas Department of Agriculture by Governor Kathleen Sebelius in February 2003. Polansky served on the Kansas Energy Council, the Governor's Council on Homeland Security and Kansas Task Force on Methamphetamine and Illegal Drugs. Polansky graduated from Kansas State University in 1972 with a Bachelor of Science degree in agronomy.

Polansky was appointed Executive Director of the Kansas Farm Service Agency on July 1, 2009, by the Obama Administration. He served in the same capacity from 1993 to 2001 under the Clinton Administration.

== Personal life ==
Polansky lives in Manhattan, Kansas with his wife, Kristine, who is an attorney. They married in January 2003. Polansky’s first wife, Joyce, died in 1993 after 18 years of marriage. A son, Adam, is a 2002 graduate of Kansas State University who currently is involved in managing the Belleville, Kansas-based family farm and seed business. Adam’s twin, A.J., was lost in an automobile accident in January 2001. A daughter, Amber, and her husband, are graduates of the University of Kansas pharmacy school. They own and operate City Pharmacy in Minneapolis, Kansas. Benjamin Larscheid, Polansky’s stepson by his current marriage, attends Ft. Hays State University.

== Organizations ==
- Member, Kansas Crop Improvement Association, 1964–present
- Secretary/Treasurer, National Association of Wheat Growers Education Foundation, 1987
- President, Kansas Crop Improvement Association, 1986–1987
- Agriculture Council of America, 1979–1985
- Former Policy Chairman, Kansas Farmers Union
- Former President, Republic County Farmers Union
- Member, Former Chairman, United States Wheat Associates.
