= Mike Beam =

American politician

Kansas Secretary of Agriculture
- Incumbent
- Assumed office January 14, 2019
- Governor: Laura Kelly
- Preceded by: Jackie McClaskey

Personal details
- Education: Kansas State University (BA)

Michael Beam is an American government official who serves as the Kansas Secretary of Agriculture. Prior to his appointment to the position by Governor Laura Kelly, Beam served as Senior Vice President for the Kansas Livestock Association.

== Career ==
Following his graduation for Kansas State University with a degree in Animal Sciences, Beam joined the Kansas Livestock Association as a Field Representative. The Kansas Livestock Association acts as the primary advocacy organization for the state's livestock industry on legislative and industry issues. Over the next 38 years, Beam worked a variety of positions for the organization, including as Executive Director of Ranchland Trust of Kansas, and finally as Senior Vice President. Beam also served as President of Agribusiness Council of Kansas City.

== Kansas Secretary of Agriculture ==
On January 10, 2019, Kelly announced that she would appoint Beam as Kansas Secretary of Agriculture following her inauguration on January 14, 2019. Beam was confirmed by the Kansas Senate on April 5, 2019 by a unanimous recommendation.
