= Kay Wolf =

American politician

Member of the Kansas Senate from the 7th district
- In office January 14, 2013 – January 9, 2017
- Preceded by: Terrie Huntington
- Succeeded by: Barbara Bollier

Member of the Kansas House of Representatives from the 21st district
- In office August 8, 2005 – January 14, 2013
- Preceded by: Dean Newton
- Succeeded by: Barbara Bollier

Personal details
- Born: October 8, 1949 (age 76)
- Party: Republican
- Spouse: Steve Wolf

Kay Wolf (born October 8, 1949) is a former Republican member of the Kansas Senate, representing the 7th district from 2013 until she announced her retirement in 2016 and was replaced by Barbara Bollier in 2017. Previously, she served in the Kansas House of Representatives, representing the 21st district, from her appointment on August 8, 2005, until 2013.

Before her appointment Kay served on the Prairie Village City Council and was the director of client services for Haren Laughlin Construction. She is a member of the Johnson County Library Foundation and sits on the board of directors of Temporary Lodging for Children and Families.

== Committee membership ==
- Taxation
- Vision 2020
- Veterans, Military and Homeland Security
- Judiciary
- Joint Committee on State-Tribal Relations

== Major donors ==
The top 5 donors to Wolf's 2008 campaign were mainly professional organizations:

- 1. Kansas Contractors Assoc $1,000
- 2. Stewart, Jon L $1,000
- 3. Kansas Bankers Assoc $850
- 4. Kansas Optometric Assoc $750
- 5. Kansas Hospital Assoc $750
