= List of mayors of Salina, Kansas =

Salina, Kansas mayors

The following is a list of mayors of the city of Salina, Kansas, United States of America.

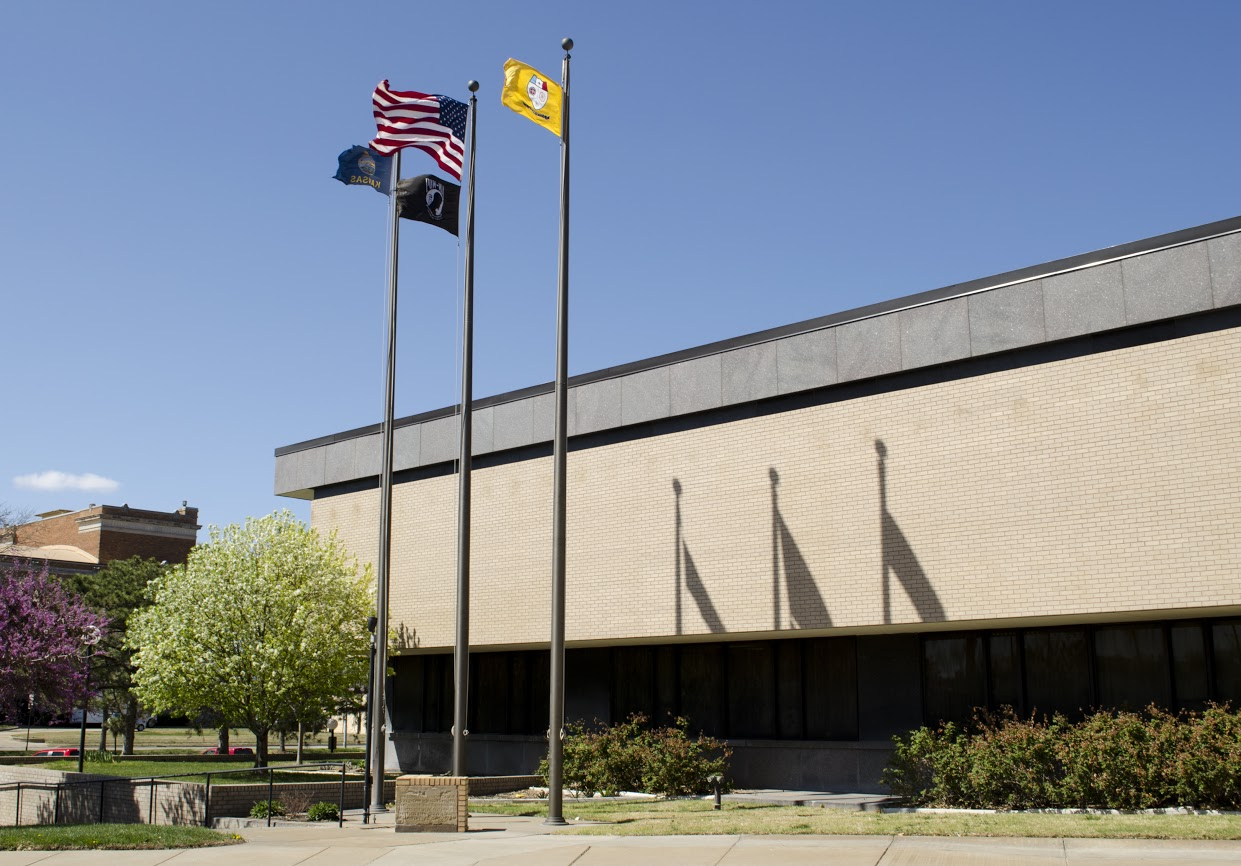
City-County Building in Salina, Kansas, 2015

- C. H. Martin, c.1870
- C. R. Underwood, c.1871, 1889–1890, 1897-1898
- James W. Russell, c.1872
- R. H. Bishop, c.1873, 1875
- W. S. Wells, c.1874
- Charles S. Radcliff, c.1876-1878
- A. W. Wickham, c.1878-1879
- William Berg, c.1879-1880
- D. J. Addison, c.1881-1882
- E. W. Ober, c.1883-1884
- Willis Bristol, c.1885-1886
- C. W. Banks, c.1887-1888
- Smith George, c.1891-1892
- R. P. Cravens, c.1892-1894
- James T. Hayward, c.1895-1896
- T. W. Roach, c.1899-1900
- Thomas Anderson, c.1901-1904
- David H. Shields, c.1905-1906
- D. W. Hills, c.1907-1908
- C. B. Kirtland, c.1909-1912
- V. E. Niquette, c.1913-1914
- J. E. Putnam, c.1915-1916
- Ed Mathews, c.1917-1921
- F. S. Dyar, c.1921-1923
- J. S. Hargett, c.1923-1926
- Guy T. Helvering, c.1926-1930
- Charles F. Dodds, c.1930-1931
- M. A. Stevenson, c.1931-1934
- Robert J. Pafford, c.1934-1935
- F. C. Peters, c.1935-1937
- Ed Morgenstern, c.1937-1945
- J. H. Moore Jr., c.1945-1946
- Lloyd W. Price, c.1946-1947, 1949-1950
- Al Noyce, c.1947-1948
- A. W. Stedham, c.1948-1949
- Richard W. King, c.1950-1951
- Carl Ramsey, c.1951-1952, 1960-1961
- Ward E. Barcafer, c.1952-1954
- E. P. Wenger, c.1954-1955
- Max S. Lake, c.1955-1956
- W. Hawkes, c.1956-1957
- Ralph Exline, c.1957-1958, 1962-1963
- Harold Jaeger, c.1958-1959
- Don C. McCune, c.1959-1960
- R. W. Bull, c.1961-1962
- Gaylord E. Spanger, c.1963-1964
- Donald Tucker, c.1964
- Carl R. Rundquist, c.1964-1965, 1967-1968
- Robert M. Stark, c.1965-1966
- G. N. Waddell, c.1966-1967
- William Yost, c.1968-1969
- Donald D. Millikan, c.1969-1970
- Robert C. Caldwell, c.1970-1972, 1975-1976
- Jack Weisgerber, c.1972-1974, 1978-1979
- William M. Usher, c.1974-1975
- Gerald F. Simpson, c.1976-1977
- Keith G. Duckers, c.1977-1978, 1982-1983
- Karen M. Graves, c.1979-1980
- Dan S. Geis, c.1980-1981
- Merle A. Hodges, c.1981-1982, 985-1986
- John F. Burgess, c.1983-1984
- Charles B. Roth, c.1984-1985
- Joseph M. Ritter, c.1986-1987
- Stephen C. Ryan, c.1987-1988, 1991-1992
- Sydney Soderberg, c.1988-1989
- Joseph A. Warner, c.1989-1990, 1994-1995
- Robert E. Frank, c.1990-1991
- Carol E. Beggs, c.1992-1993
- Peter F. Brungardt, c.1993-1994, 1998-1999
- John Divine, c.1995-1996
- Evelyn Maxwell, c.1996-1997
- Kristin M. Seaton, c.1997-1998, 2001-2003
- Monte D. Shadwick, c.1999-2000, 2004-2005
- Alan E. Jilka, c.2000-2001, 2003–2004, 2007–2008
- Deborah P. Divine, c.2005-2006
- Donnie D. Marrs, c.2006-2007
- John K. Vanier II, c.2008-2009
- M. Luci Larson, c.2009-2010
- Aaron Peck, c.2010
- Trent Davis, c.2019
- Mike Hoppock, c.2020
- Bill Longbine, c.2024

== See also ==
- Salina history
- List of first African-American mayors
