= Sara Tappan Doolittle Robinson =

- Sara Tappan Doolittle Lawrence
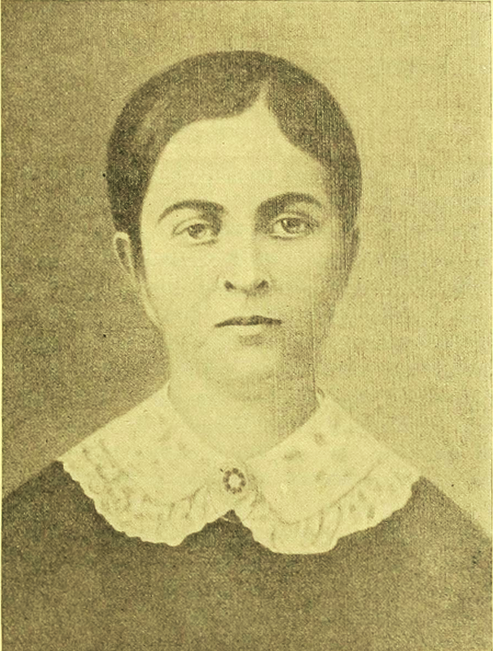
- Born: July 12, 1827; Belchertown, Massachusetts, U.S.
- Died: November 15, 1912 (aged 85); Lawrence, Kansas, U.S.
- Education: New Salem Academy
- Occupations: Writer; historian
- Spouse: Charles Robinson
- Writing career
- Years active: 1856-1911
- Period: 19th century
- Genres: History, Memoir
- Subjects: Kansas, American West, Political History
- Notable works: Kansas; its interior and exterior life

Sara Tappan Doolittle Robinson (née Lawrence) (July 12, 1827 – November 15, 1912) was an American writer and historian. She served as the inaugural First Lady of Kansas, 1861–1863, being the second wife of Charles L. Robinson (1818–1894), the first Governor of Kansas. Robinson is most notable for her book, Kansas : its interior and exterior life; including a full view of its settlement, political history, social life, climate soil, productions, scenery, etc (1856), an antislavery account of the Bleeding Kansas period in the mid-1850s. The book was considered "epoch making" for its time.

== Biography ==
She was born in Belchertown, Massachusetts. She was the eldest daughter of Myron and Clarissa (Dwight) Lawrence. In her youth, many distinguished people of the time visited the family home, including Daniel Webster, Harriet Martineau, Stephen Olin, Robert Rantoul, George Ashmun and W. B. Calhoun.

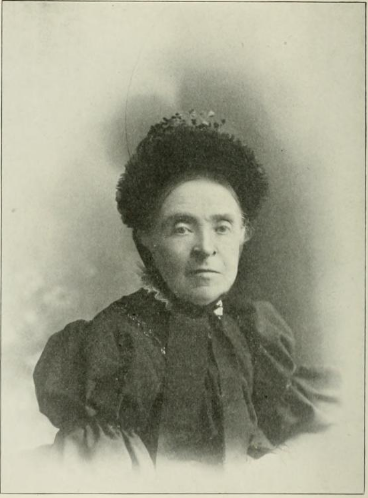
Sara Tappan Doolittle Robinson

She attended school in Belchertown and also studied at the New Salem Academy. While attending school, she fell and injured her spine, which led to sympathetic blindness. Dr. Robinson (later Governor) was practicing medicine in Belchertown, where he was introduced to Miss Lawrence. Under his care, she regained her health. They married on October 30, 1851.

Robinson was a member of the Betty Washington Chapter of the Daughters of the American Revolution (D.A.R.). She founded a research table in the Marine Biological Laboratory at Woods Hole, Massachusetts for young women. She gave the first donation toward marking the Santa Fe Trail. The Robinsons did not have any children. She had been with the Sunflower State from its inception, and died in Lawrence, Kansas at the couple's "Oakridge" home in 1911. Their estate, valued at $200,000, was bequeathed to the University of Kansas. The couple's private papers, 1834–1911, are part of the holdings of the Kansas State Historical Society.

== Selected publications ==
- Kansas; its interior and exterior life. Including a full view of its settlement, political history, social life, climate, soil, productions, scenery, etc. (1856)
- Personal recollections of Mrs. Sara T.D. Robinson of the Quantrell Raid of Aug. 21, 1863. (between 1863 and 1911)
