= Kansas's 7th Senate district =

American legislative district

Kansas's 7th State Senate district
Senator
Ethan Corson; D–Fairway
- Demographics: 87% White; 3% Black; 5% Hispanic; 3% Asian; 2% Other
- Population (2018): 73,076

Kansas's 7th Senate district is one of 40 districts in the Kansas Senate. It has been represented by Democrat Ethan Corson since 2021.

== Geography ==
District 7 covers the inner suburbs of Kansas City in Johnson County, including Prairie Village, Mission, Roeland Park, Fairway, Mission Hills, Westwood, and parts of Leawood and Overland Park.

The district is located entirely within Kansas's 3rd congressional district, and overlaps with the 19th, 21st, 24th, and 25th districts of the Kansas House of Representatives. It borders the state of Missouri.

== Recent election results from statewide races ==
Year	U.S. President	U.S. Senator	U.S. House	Governor	Attorney General
2008	Obama (D): 53.5 – 45.2%	[Data unknown/missing]	[Data unknown/missing]	—	—
2012	Obama (D): 49.5 – 48.3%	—	[Data unknown/missing]	—	—
2016	Clinton (D): 56 – 35%	Wiesner (D): 48.7 – 46.8%	[Data unknown/missing]	—	—
2018	—	—	Davids (D): 63 – 35.1%	Kelly (D): 66.2 – 27%	Swain (D): 60.8 – 39.2%
2020	Biden (D): 65 – 33%	Bollier (D): 64 – 33%	[Data unknown/missing]	—	—

== Recent election results ==
=== 2020 ===
2020 Kansas Senate election, District 7
Party	Candidate	Votes	%
Democratic	Ethan Corson	28,215	59.3
Republican	Laura McConwell	19,348	40.7
Total votes		47,563	100
Democratic hold			

=== 2016 ===
2016 Kansas Senate election, District 7
Party	Candidate	Votes	%
Republican	Barbara Bollier	22,439	54.3
Democratic	Megan England	18,884	45.7
Total votes		41,323	100
Republican hold			

=== 2012 ===
2012 Kansas Senate election, District 7
Primary election
Party	Candidate	Votes	%
Republican	Kay Wolf	5,176	57.1
Republican	David Harvey	3,889	42.9
Total votes		9,065	100
General election
Republican	Kay Wolf	20,738	53.1
Democratic	Kyle Russell	18,334	46.9
Total votes		39,072	100
Republican hold			
