= Josh Svaty =

American politician (born 1979)

Secretary of Agriculture of Kansas
- In office July 14, 2009 – January 10, 2011
- Governor: Mark Parkinson
- Preceded by: Adrian Polansky
- Succeeded by: Dale Rodman

Member of the Kansas House of Representatives from the 108th district
- In office January 8, 2003 – July 14, 2009
- Preceded by: Dennis McKinney
- Succeeded by: Don Svaty

Personal details
- Born: November 7, 1979 (age 46) Ellsworth, Kansas, U.S.
- Party: Democratic
- Spouse: Kimberly Svaty
- Children: 4
- Education: Sterling College (BS)

Joshua Svaty (/ˈswɑːti/; born November 7, 1979) is an American politician, farmer, and businessman from Kansas. He announced his bid for the 2018 Kansas gubernatorial election as a Democrat on May 16, 2017. In 2002, at the age of 22, Svaty was elected to the Kansas House of Representatives and served until he was appointed secretary of the Kansas Department of Agriculture by Governor Mark Parkinson on July 14, 2009. After leaving office in 2011, Svaty served as the Vice President of The Land Institute, a nonprofit agricultural research entity near Salina. He and his wife own a farm in Ellsworth County, Kansas.

== Education ==
Svaty received his undergraduate degree from Sterling College, a small liberal arts college in Sterling, Kansas. He later attended Washburn University School of Law in Topeka, Kansas, partly during his term in the Kansas House of Representatives.

== Career ==
=== Campaign for Governor ===
Since announcing he was running for Governor of Kansas in May 2017, Svaty visited all 105 Kansas counties as part of his campaign trail, traveling over 16,701 miles and counting.

In May 2018, Svaty announced his running mate for lieutenant governor to be Katrina Lewison, a Manhattan-Ogden USD 383 Board of Education member and former Blackhawk helicopter pilot.

=== House of Representatives ===
Svaty was first elected to the Kansas House of Representatives at the age of 22. Svaty started his term on January 8, 2003 as a representative of the 108th district, which consisted of Ellsworth County, rural Saline County, parts of south Salina, and Solomon in Dickinson County. Svaty, a member of the Democratic Party, was elected in a district in which the Republican Party held a 2-to-1 registration advantage. He was re-elected to his House seat three times.

==== Committee membership ====
- Energy and Utilities
- Agriculture and Natural Resources (Ranking Member)
- Joint Committee on Energy and Environmental Policy

==== Major donors ====
The top 5 donors to Svaty's 2008 campaign:

- 1. AT&T $1,500
- 2. Kansas National Education Assoc $1,000
- 3. Kansas Medical Society $1,000
- 4. Kansas Contractors Assoc $1,000
- 5. Pioneer Communications $1,000

=== Secretary of Agriculture ===
Governor Mark Parkinson appointed Svaty as the Kansas Secretary of Agriculture in 2009. He served in this role from 2009-2011.

=== EPA ===
Svaty served as senior advisor to the regional administrator for the Environmental Protection Agency’s Region 7 for more than two years, following his time as the Secretary of Agriculture.

=== The Land Institute ===
Svaty served as the vice president of The Land Institute, a science-based research organization based in Saline County that is working on developing perennial grain crops, before he returned to farming in Ellsworth County. He left The Land Institute in 2015 to focus fully on Free State Farms.

=== Free State Farms ===
Svaty and his wife, Kimberly, own and operate Free State Farms, a crop and livestock operation in Ellsworth County. Free State Farms was formed in 2010 and is a fully diversified operation that includes wheat, sorghum, soybeans, sunflowers, and a cow/calf operation.
