= Terrie Huntington =

American politician (born 1949)

Member of the Kansas Senate from the 7th district
- In office January 2010 – January 14, 2013
- Preceded by: David Wysong
- Succeeded by: Kay Wolf

Member of the Kansas House of Representatives from the 25th district
- In office January 13, 2003 – January 2010
- Preceded by: Alfred J. Lane
- Succeeded by: Barbara Bollier

Personal details
- Born: October 24, 1949 (age 76) Wichita, Kansas, U.S.
- Party: Republican
- Spouse: Jim Huntington
- Children: 2
- Education: University of Kansas
- Profession: marketing communications

Terrie Huntington (October 24, 1949) is an American politician and member of the Republican Party who served as a member of the Kansas House of Representatives from 2003 to 2010 and as a member of the Kansas State Senate from 2010 to 2013.

== Career ==
Prior to her election to the House, Huntington has served as a member of the Village Presbyterian Church, Shawnee Mission Education Foundation, National Development Council, and Northeast Johnson County Chamber of Commerce.

Huntington served in the Kansas House of Representatives, representing the 25th district, from 2003 until 2010, when she resigned to join the Senate.

In the Kansas Senate, Huntington represented the 7th district. She was appointed to serve the remainder of David Wysong's term, who had resigned.

After being targeted for defeat in the 2012 primary elections for her moderate positions, Huntington declined to run for election to a full term. She was succeeded by fellow Republican Kay Wolf.

== Personal life ==
She is a graduate of the University of Kansas and has been married to her husband, Jim, for 33 years. They have two children.

== Committee assignments ==
Huntington served on these legislative committees in the Senate:

- Ways and Means
- Local Government
- Kansas Public Employees Retirement System Select
- Educational Planning
- Public Health and Welfare
- Transportation

== Major donors ==
The top 5 donors to Huntington's 2008 campaign are individuals:

- 1. Totten, Bob $500
- 2. Kemp, Brad $500
- 3. Desetti, Mark $500
- 4. Bell, Luke $500
- 5. Brownback, Sam $500

Political offices
Preceded by David Wysong	Kansas Senate (District 7); January 2010 - January 14, 2013	Succeeded by Kay Wolf
Preceded by Alfred J. Lane	Kansas House of Representatives (District 25); January 13, 2003 - January 2010	Succeeded by Barbara Bollier
