= Kansas Department of Agriculture =

State agency of Kansas

Agency overview
- Formed: 1862 adopted by Kansas Legislature as Kansas Agriculture Society (1857 - first public meeting)
- Headquarters: 1320 Research Park Drive; Manhattan, Kansas
- Employees: About 314
- Agency executive: Mike Beam, Secretary of Agriculture
- Website: website

The Kansas Department of Agriculture (KDA) is a department of the government of Kansas under the Governor of Kansas. It is responsible for providing services and expertise that promote agriculture and protect Kansas' food supply and natural resources while stimulating economic growth.

The current Secretary of Agriculture is Mike Beam, who was appointed by Governor Laura Kelly in 2019.

== History ==
The Kansas Department of Agriculture's history traces back to the 1850s when a group of farmers in Kansas Territory created agriculture "societies". Records of the earliest society, established in 1857, are sparse because they were burned when a confederate named William Quantrill raided and burned Lawrence, Kansas. The Kansas State Agricultural Society held its first public meeting in 1857, while Kansas was a territory. The Kansas Legislature officially adopted the Kansas State Agricultural Society as a state entity in 1862.

The Kansas Board of Agriculture was created in 1872, building upon the work of the Kansas State Agricultural Society, which had served as a model for departments of agriculture nationwide. The agency became the Kansas Department of Agriculture in 1995. Kansas Farmer, an agricultural publication in Kansas, was established in 1863 in Topeka by the Kansas State Board of Agriculture. Kansas State University has a collection of its magazines.

On March 5, 1862, the Kansas Legislature created the Kansas State Agricultural Society, with Floyd Perry Baker temporarily presiding, by statute to organize agricultural work statewide. In 1872, the Kansas Legislature created the State Board of Agriculture from the structure of the Agriculture Society. It became the grandfather of agricultural departments in all fifty states.

The board's early years were spent organizing a state fair and acting as an immigration agency to attract needed settlers to homestead in Kansas. Gradually, the state lost its image as a part of the "Great American Desert". Farms and towns sprang up on the fertile plains of the future wheat state. The Board of Agriculture through an annual report and various publications about Kansas served as a source of information and new techniques in farming.

Through the grasshopper invasion, droughts, blizzards, and through the invention of barbed wire, the development of combines and advances undreamed in 1872, the Kansas Board of Agriculture has served the producers and consumers of Kansas agricultural products. In 1994, a court found the selection process for choosing a Secretary of Agriculture was unconstitutional and placed the governor of Kansas in charge. Following this the Board was renamed the Kansas Department of Agriculture.

== Activities ==
The Kansas Department of Agriculture (KDA) has many divisions and programs including the Agricultural Laboratory, Agricultural Marketing, Advocacy, and Outreach Team, Dairy and Feed Safety, Division of Animal Health, Division of Conservation, Division of Water Resources, Emergency Management, Food Safety and Lodging, Grain Warehouse, Meat and Poultry Inspection, Pesticide and Fertilizer, Plant Protection and Weed Control, and Weights and Measures. The department also provides a large variety of services including licensing guides, grants and cost-share programs, Kansas commodity commissions, export inspections (foreign or domestic), soil fumigation notifications, weed free forage inspections, export certificate applications, live plant inspection applications, and much more.

On June 16, 2014, the majority of the department's employees were moved from Topeka to offices in Manhattan, Kansas.

=== Former Secretaries ===
- Alfred Gray 1873-1880
- Joseph K. Hudson 1880-1881
- Foster Dwight Coburn 1881-1882, 1894-1914
- William Sims 1882 - 1888
- Martin Mohler 1888 - 1894
- Jacob C. Mohler 1914 - 1950
- Roy Freeland - 1950 - 1977
- William W. Duitsman 1977 - 1982
- Harland Priddle 1982 - 1986
- Sam Brownback 1986 - 1993
- Phillip Fishburn 1993 - 1995
- Allie Devine 1995 - 1999
- Jamie Clover-Adams 2000-2002
- Adrian Polansky 2003 - 2009
- Joshua Svaty 2009 - 2011
- Dale Rodman 2011 - 2013
- Jackie McClaskey 2013 - 2019

== Leadership ==
The department is administered by the Secretary of Agriculture. Under Governor Laura Kelly, Mike Beam was appointed as Secretary in January 2019.

=== State Board of Agriculture ===
The Kansas State Board of Agriculture serves as an advisory board to the Governor of Kansas and the Secretary of Agriculture. The Board is composed of nine members, appointed by the Governor to serve four year terms. One member is appointed from each of Kansas' four congressional districts, with the remaining five being appointed at-large. No two members can reside in the same county and no more than five members may be from the same political party. The Board is responsible for electing its own chair and Vice Chair.

The Board assists the Governor and Secretary in the development of legislative priorities and Departmental rules and regulations, except those which relate solely to personnel matters of the department. The Board, however, has no powers, duties or functions concerning the day-to-day operations of the department.

The Board includes the following: Tracy Brunner (District 1), Janis Lee (District 1), Jerry C. McReynolds (District 1), William Pracht (District 2), Thad G. Geiger (District 2), Scott Thellman (District 2), Scott Strickland (District 3), Donna Pearson McClish (District 3), and Michael L. Springer (District 4).

Prior to the current system for selecting members of the board, farm interest groups would send delegates to a convention held for this purpose. The board members then selected the Secretary of Agriculture who would be confirmed by the Kansas Senate. This system was ruled unconstitutional by the courts in 1994, making way for the current system

== Divisions ==
- Secretary of Agriculture
  - Administrative Services - responsible for coordinating the management functions of the Department
    - Office of the Secretary
    - Fiscal Section
    - Agriculture Statistics
    - Human Resources
    - Information Technology
    - Legal Section
    - Emergency Management
    - Information Technology Section
  - Agricultural Business Services
    - Agricultural Laboratory
      - Grain Warehouse
      - Weights & Measures
    - Dairy and Feed Safety
    - Food Safety and Lodging
    - Meat and Poultry Inspection
    - Plant Protection and Weed Control
    - Pesticide and Fertilizer
    - Agricultural Marketing, Advocacy and Outreach Team
  - Division of Animal Health
  - Division of Conservation
  - Division of Water Resources - governs how the state's water resources are allocated and used and regulates through statute the construction of dams, levees and other changes to streams.
    - Appropriations
    - Management Services
    - Structures
