= Charles Roth =

American politician

Member of the Kansas House of Representatives from the 71st district
- In office February 2, 2005 – January 14, 2013
- Preceded by: Carol E. Beggs
- Succeeded by: Diana Dierks

Personal details
- Born: October 2, 1946 (age 79) Salina, Kansas, U.S.
- Party: Republican
- Spouse: Marcy
- Children: 3
- Education: University of Kansas

Charles Roth (October 2, 1946) is a Republican member of the Kansas House of Representatives, representing the 71st district. He has served after being first appointed February 2, 2005 to 2013.

Roth, a graduate of the University of Kansas, owned Joseph P. Roth and sons from 1968-2005.

He has been long active in the community, including a year as mayor of Salina from 1984-1985. Additionally he has been a member of the Community Health Investment Program, Salina County Club, Salina United Way Board, and Salina Area Chamber of Commerce.

== Committee membership ==
- Education
- Corrections and Juvenile Justice
- Government Efficiency and Fiscal Oversight

== Major donors ==
The top 5 donors to Roth's 2008 campaign:

- 1. Kansans for Lifesaving Cures $1,000
- 2. Koch Industries $1,000
- 3. Kansas Assoc of Realtors $900
- 4. Wal-Mart $800
- 5. Kansas Bankers Assoc $800

== See also ==
- List of mayors of Salina, Kansas
