= Audrey Langworthy =

American politician

Member of the Kansas Senate from the 7th district
- In office January 14, 1985 – January 8, 2001
- Preceded by: Norman Gaar
- Succeeded by: David Adkins

Personal details
- Born: April 1, 1934 (age 92) Grand Forks, North Dakota
- Party: Republican
- Education: University of Kansas

Audrey Langworthy (born April 1, 1934) is an American politician who served in the Kansas Senate from the 7th district from 1985 to 2001.

Langworthy attended the University of Kansas. Before her time in the Kansas Senate, Langworthy was elected as a city council member. In the Senate, Langworthy defeated and replaced longtime Kansas Senator Norman Gaar, who had been in the chamber since 1965. She self-identified as a moderate Republican, and unlike more conservative members of her party she took a pro-choice stance on abortion, which was a hotly contested issue in Kansas during her time in the Senate. She declined to run for re-election in 2000.
