= Recreational therapy =

Form of therapy

Recreational Therapist
- ICD-9-CM: 93.81
- MeSH: D057173

Recreational therapy or therapeutic recreation (TR) is a systematic process that utilizes recreation, leisure, and other activities as interventions to address the assessed needs of individuals with illnesses and/or disabling conditions, as a means to psychological and physical health, recovery and well-being. Recreational therapy may also be simply referred to as recreation therapy, but in short, it is the utilization and enhancement of leisure.

The work of recreational therapists differs from other professionals on the basis of using leisure activities alone to meet well-being goals, they work with clients to enhance motor, social and cognitive functioning, build confidence, develop coping skills, and integrate skills learned in treatment settings into community settings. Intervention areas vary widely and are based upon enjoyable and rewarding interests of the client. Examples of intervention modalities include creative arts (e.g., crafts, music, dance, drama, among others), games, sports like adventure programming, exercises like dance/movement, and skill enhancement activities (Motor, locomotion, sensory, cognition, communication, and behavior).

"Today, the United States Department of Labor projects that there are over 19,000 recreational therapists in the United States. As of January 2023, there are 19,278 professionals who hold active, inactive, or eligible for re-entry status on the NCTRC registry. The CTRS credential is the most professionally advanced credential for the field of therapeutic recreation."

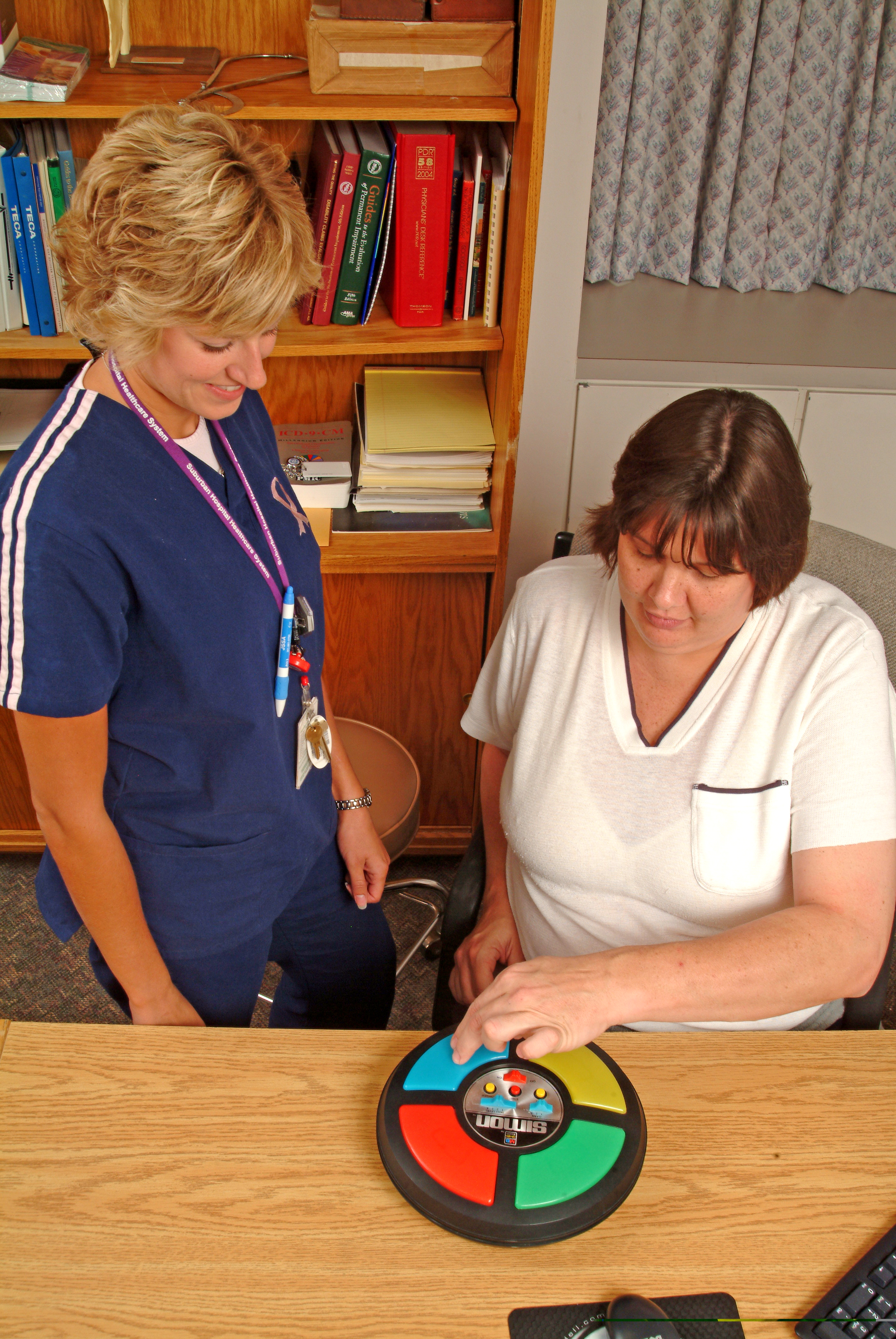
A patient playing Simon during a recreational therapy session

There are four approaches in therapeutic recreation:

- Recreation services: Providing recreation services to people with disabilities for experiencing leisure and its benefits, often this takes a rehabilitation tone in approach for helping clients to reach an optimal level of health and well-being.
- Therapeutic approach: The purpose of this approach is curative in nature. It attempts to lessen and ameliorate the effects of illness' and disabilities, it also can be prescriptive for improving certain functional capacities.
- Umbrella or combined approach: Use of recreation as a subjective continuation of enjoyable activities as well as a recreation service for bringing purposeful change.
- Leisure ability approach: An approach that operates leisure activities therapeutically and engages the clients fully for participation with good dissemination on the benefits of structured leisure/ leisure awareness education (Gun & Peterson, 1978).

Eight domains of leisure are: leisure awareness, leisure attitudes, leisure skills, community integration skills, community participation, cultural and social behaviors, interpersonal skills.

== Educational programs ==
A bachelor's degree in recreational therapy is required for most entry-level positions. These programs typically cover areas such as treatment and program planning, human body, physiology, kinesiology, and professional ethics. Some programs offer the opportunity to specialize in occupational therapy, and in the intervention of those that are mentally or physically challenged. Most employers prefer to hire candidates who are Certified Therapeutic Recreation Specialists (CTRS). Therapists become certified through the National Council for Therapeutic Recreation Certification (NCTRC) or through a provincial regulatory body such as, Therapeutic Recreation Ontario (TRO). To qualify for certification under the Academic Path, applicants must have a bachelor's degree in TR, complete an internship under the supervision of a CTRS, and pass a written exam. There is also an Equivalency Path A and B for certification. The requirements are slightly different and include a bachelor's degree outside of TR, paid work experience, and successful completion of the written exam.

=== Pre-Internship Requirements ===
- An individual must be enrolled in a regionally accredited baccalaureate degree program (or higher). Degrees include; "(a) therapeutic recreation (recreation therapy); (b) recreation or leisure with an option in therapeutic recreation; (c) therapeutic recreation, recreation, or leisure in combination with other fields of study (e.g., Therapeutic Recreation and Health Studies; Recreation and Sport Management; Leisure and Tourism); and (d) a major in another field of study with a concentration/emphasis/sub-plan/option/minor/certificate in recreation therapy/therapeutic recreation".
- A a minimum of 90 credit hours towards attaining the degree must be completed.
- A minimum of 18 semester or 24 quarter credit hours of Recreational Therapy/Therapeutic Recreation (RT/TR) specific courses have to be completed:
  - A minimum of 6 courses in RT/TR are required (two of the required must be taught by applicant as an educator).
  - Each individual must take 3 semester hours or 4 quarter hours coursework in each of the areas; anatomy and physiology, abnormal psychology, human growth and development across the lifespan, and the remaining semester hours or quarter hours should be fulfilled in the areas of social sciences and humanities.

=== Internship Requirements ===
- The duration of the Internship is a minimum of 560 hours over the course of 14 consecutive weeks (or more).
- If you go under 20 hours in a week (Sun-Sat), the internship must restart.
- Supervision by internship supervisor must have active CTRS (Certified Therapeutic Recreation Specialist) and have been certified for at least one year prior to supervising interns.
- Internship completion must appear on official academic transcript.

The CTRS credential, is evidence that the individual completed and met the qualifications for the NCTRC's CTRS Certification Standards. This is a limited license that requires individuals to continue education and trainings.

=== Continuing Education ===
Recreation Therapists with the Certified Therapeutic Recreation Specialist (CTRS) credential are required to complete 50 clock hours (5.0 CEUs) of continuing education within a 5 year span as part of the overall requirements to renew national certification through NCTRC.

NCTRC has outlined several ways a CTRS can earn continuing education Continuing Education.

These include:

a.) Academic Courses

b.) Teleconferences/Audio Seminars like ATRA's webinar series.

c.) Internet Course Programs: Some online programs identified are on the Therapeutic Recreation Directory website: Therapeutic Recreation Directory: CEU Opportunities. The largest online providers for RT continuing education are: 1) ATRA- American Therapeutic Recreation Association Webinars 2) Rec Therapy Today 3) SMART CEUs Hub- Success Makers Are Rec Therapists- Unlimited NCTRC Pre-Approved CEUs

d.) Conferences: American Therapeutic Recreation Association (ATRA) and state branches of ATRA. Recreation therapists can attend conferences provided by related professional organizations and earn CEUs (pending the session meets Therapeutic Recreation (TR) knowledge areas required by NCTRC.

e.) Internships & Externships: Supervised guidance to practice.

== Professional Organizations ==
The American Therapeutic Recreation Association (ATRA) and the Canadian Therapeutic Recreation Association (CTRA) are the largest national membership organizations representing the interests and needs of recreational therapists in the U. S. and Canada. ATRA is the only organization that represents the therapeutic recreation profession in the United States."ATRA, was incorporated in the District of Columbia in 1984 as a non-profit, grassroots organization in response to a growing concern about the dramatic changes in the healthcare industry. As a result of this response, ATRA has grown from a membership of 60 individuals in June 1984 to 2,200 in 2014."

== Credentialing ==
Certification: The National Council for Therapeutic Recreation Certification, a charter member of the National Organization for Competency Assurance (NOCA), also provides a certification that expires after 5 years. "NCTRC was founded to protect the consumer of recreational therapy services and the public at large, resulting in many benefits to the public, the profession, the individual practitioner, and the organization." Those who are certified must apply for re-certification at the end of the expiration period. Specialty certification is now available in five areas. Health and human service professionals who acquire a higher level of knowledge and more advanced skills provide the consumer with a greater depth of service compared to individuals who practice at less advanced levels. Specialization is well recognized within professional practice and has become the norm within the health and human service delivery system today. The median salary for recreational therapists in the United States was estimated $51,330 a year in 2022. This number may vary slightly based on specific geographic region, years of experience, and type of employing agency.

Licensure: There are currently five states that require a Recreational Therapy licensure (Utah, North Carolina, New Hampshire, New Jersey and Oklahoma). To practice Recreational Therapy in these states, professionals must possess a current, valid state license. In addition to the five currently licensed states, numerous other states are currently moving toward developing licensure. Through the Joint Task Force on Recreational Therapy Licensure sponsored by the American Therapeutic Recreation Association and the National Council for Therapeutic Recreation Certification, significant progress is being made in the licensure arena. Licensure is being pursued by the profession as a further means of protecting the public from potential harm.
