= 2022 United States House of Representatives elections in Kansas =

- November 8, 2022

All 4 Kansas seats to the United States House of Representatives
	Majority party	Minority party
Party	Republican	Democratic
Last election	3	1
Seats won	3	1
Seat change	Steady	Steady
Popular vote	569,567	425,322
Percentage	56.85%	42.46%
Swing	▼0.25%	▲1.45%

Republican
50–60%
60–70%
70–80%
80–90%
>90%
Democratic
50–60%
60–70%

The 2022 United States House of Representatives elections in Kansas were held on November 8, 2022, to elect the four U.S. representatives from the state of Kansas, one from each of the state's four congressional districts. The elections coincided with other elections to the House of Representatives, elections to the United States Senate, and various state and local elections.

== Overview ==
District	Republican		Democratic		Others		Total		Result
District	Votes	%	Votes	%	Votes	%	Votes	%	Result
District 1	161,333	67.67%	77,092	32.33%	0	0.00%	238,425	100.0%	Republican hold
District 2	134,506	57.64%	98,852	42.36%	0	0.00%	233,358	100.0%	Republican hold
District 3	128,839	42.76%	165,527	54.94%	6,928	2.30%	301,294	100.0%	Democratic hold
District 4	144,889	63.34%	83,851	36.66%	0	0.00%	228,740	100.0%	Republican hold
Total	569,567	56.85%	425,322	42.46%	6,928	0.69%	1,001,817	100.0%	

Popular vote
Republican	56.85%
Democratic	42.46%
Other	0.69%

House seats
Republican	75.00%
Democratic	25.00%

== District 1 ==
2022 Kansas's 1st congressional district election
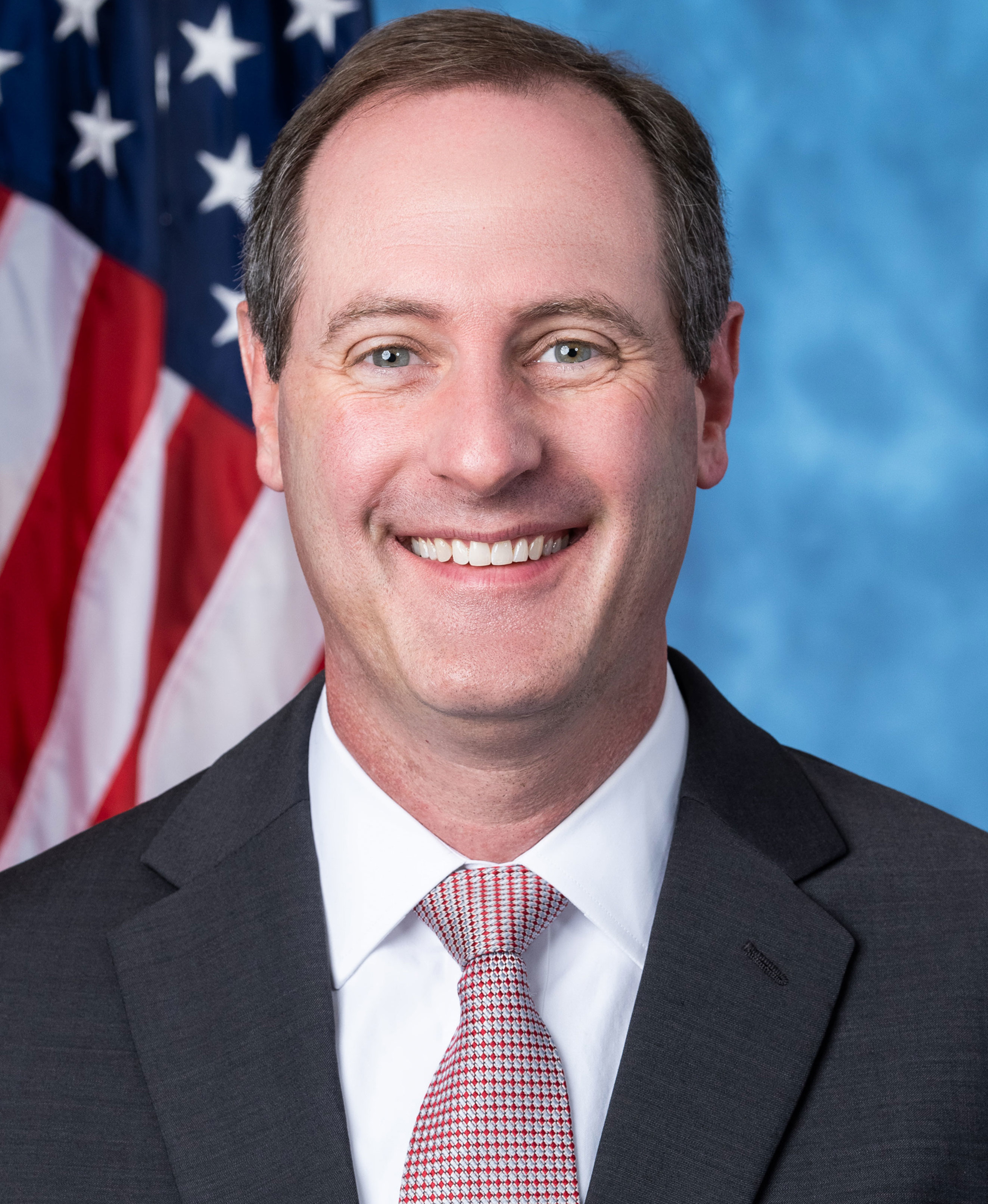

Nominee	Tracey Mann	Jimmy Beard
Party	Republican	Democratic
Popular vote	161,333	77,092
Percentage	67.7%	32.3%
- Mann: 50–60% 60–70% 70–80% 80–90% >90% Beard: 50–60% 60–70% 70–80% 80–90% >90% Tie: 50% No votes
U.S. Representative before election
Tracey Mann
Republican
Elected U.S. Representative
Tracey Mann
Republican

The 1st district encompasses much of rural western and northern Kansas, as well as much of the city of Lawrence. Other cities in the district include Manhattan, Salina, Dodge City, Garden City, Hays and Hutchinson. The incumbent was Republican Tracey Mann, who was elected with 71.2% of the vote in the previous version of this district in 2020.

=== Republican primary ===
==== Candidates ====
===== Nominee =====
- Tracey Mann, incumbent U.S. representative

==== Endorsements ====
Tracey Mann

U.S. executive branch officials

- Donald Trump, former president of the United States

==== Results ====
Republican primary results
Party	Candidate	Votes	%
Republican	Tracey Mann (incumbent)	117,899	100.0
Total votes		117,899	100.0

=== Democratic primary ===
==== Candidates ====
===== Nominee =====
- Jimmy Beard, teacher

==== Results ====
Democratic primary results
Party	Candidate	Votes	%
Democratic	Jimmy Beard	42,589	100.0
Total votes		42,589	100.0

=== General election ===
==== Predictions ====
Source	Ranking	As of
The Cook Political Report	Solid R	May 19, 2022
Inside Elections	Solid R	May 27, 2022
Sabato's Crystal Ball	Safe R	February 16, 2022
Politico	Solid R	April 5, 2022
RCP	Safe R	June 9, 2022
Fox News	Solid R	July 11, 2022
DDHQ	Solid R	July 20, 2022
538	Solid R	June 30, 2022
The Economist	Safe R	September 28, 2022

==== Results ====
2022 Kansas's 1st congressional district election
Party	Candidate	Votes	%
Republican	Tracey Mann (incumbent)	161,333	67.7
Democratic	Jimmy Beard	77,092	32.3
Total votes		238,425	100.0
Republican hold			

== District 2 ==
2022 Kansas's 2nd congressional district election
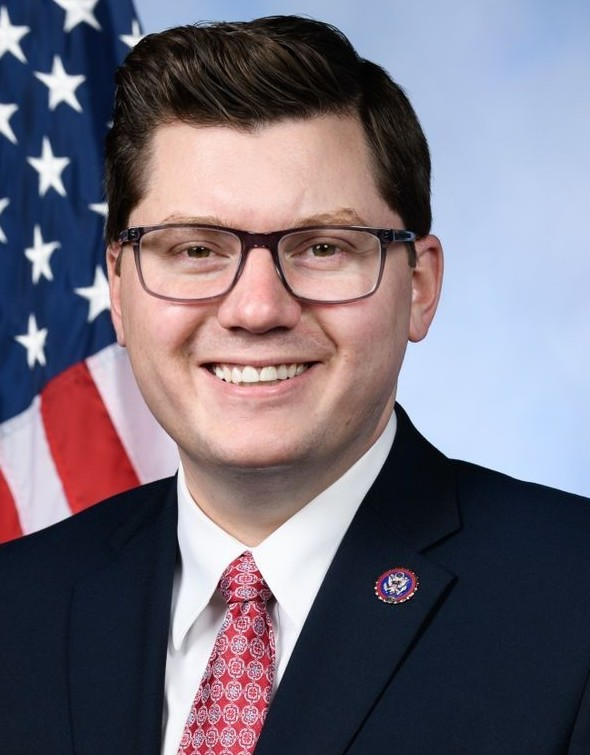

Nominee	Jake LaTurner	Patrick Schmidt
Party	Republican	Democratic
Popular vote	134,506	98,852
Percentage	57.6%	42.4%
- LaTurner: 40–50% 50–60% 60–70% 70–80% 80–90% >90% Schmidt: 50–60% 60–70% 70–80% 80–90% >90% Tie: 50% No votes
U.S. Representative before election
Jake LaTurner
Republican
Elected U.S. Representative
Jake LaTurner
Republican

The 2nd district stretches across much of eastern Kansas from Nebraska to Oklahoma, including the cities of Topeka, Emporia, Junction City and Pittsburg, as well as portions of Kansas City and Lawrence. The incumbent was Republican Jake LaTurner, who was elected with 55.2% of the vote in the previous version of this district in 2020.

=== Republican primary ===
==== Candidates ====
===== Nominee =====
- Jake LaTurner, incumbent U.S. representative

==== Results ====
Republican primary results
Party	Candidate	Votes	%
Republican	Jake LaTurner (incumbent)	94,578	100.0
Total votes		94,578	100.0

=== Democratic primary ===
==== Candidates ====
===== Nominee =====
- Patrick Schmidt, retired U.S. Navy officer

==== Results ====
Democratic primary results
Party	Candidate	Votes	%
Democratic	Patrick Schmidt	54,439	100.0
Total votes		54,439	100.0

=== General election ===
==== Debate ====
2022 Kansas's 2nd congressional district debate
No.	Date	Host	Moderator	Link	Republican	Democratic
Key: P Participant A Absent N Not invited I Invited W Withdrawn						
Key: P Participant A Absent N Not invited I Invited W Withdrawn					Jake LaTurner	Patrick Schmidt
1	Nov. 2, 2022	KTWU; Washburn University; Political Science Department	Bob Beatty		P	P

==== Predictions ====
Source	Ranking	As of
The Cook Political Report	Solid R	May 19, 2022
Inside Elections	Solid R	May 27, 2022
Sabato's Crystal Ball	Safe R	February 16, 2022
Politico	Solid R	April 5, 2022
RCP	Safe R	June 9, 2022
Fox News	Solid R	July 11, 2022
DDHQ	Solid R	July 20, 2022
538	Solid R	June 30, 2022
The Economist	Safe R	September 28, 2022

==== Polling ====
Poll source	Date(s) administered	Sample size (Note: Key: A – all adults RV – registered voters LV – likely voters V – unclear)	Margin of error	Jake LaTurner (R)	Patrick Schmidt (D)	Undecided
Jayhawk Consulting (Note: This poll was sponsored by Schmidt's campaign)	October 10–12, 2022	500 (LV)	–	45%	42%	14%

==== Results ====
2022 Kansas's 2nd congressional district election
Party	Candidate	Votes	%
Republican	Jake LaTurner (incumbent)	134,506	57.6
Democratic	Patrick Schmidt	98,852	42.4
Total votes		233,358	100.0
Republican hold			

== District 3 ==
2022 Kansas's 3rd congressional district election
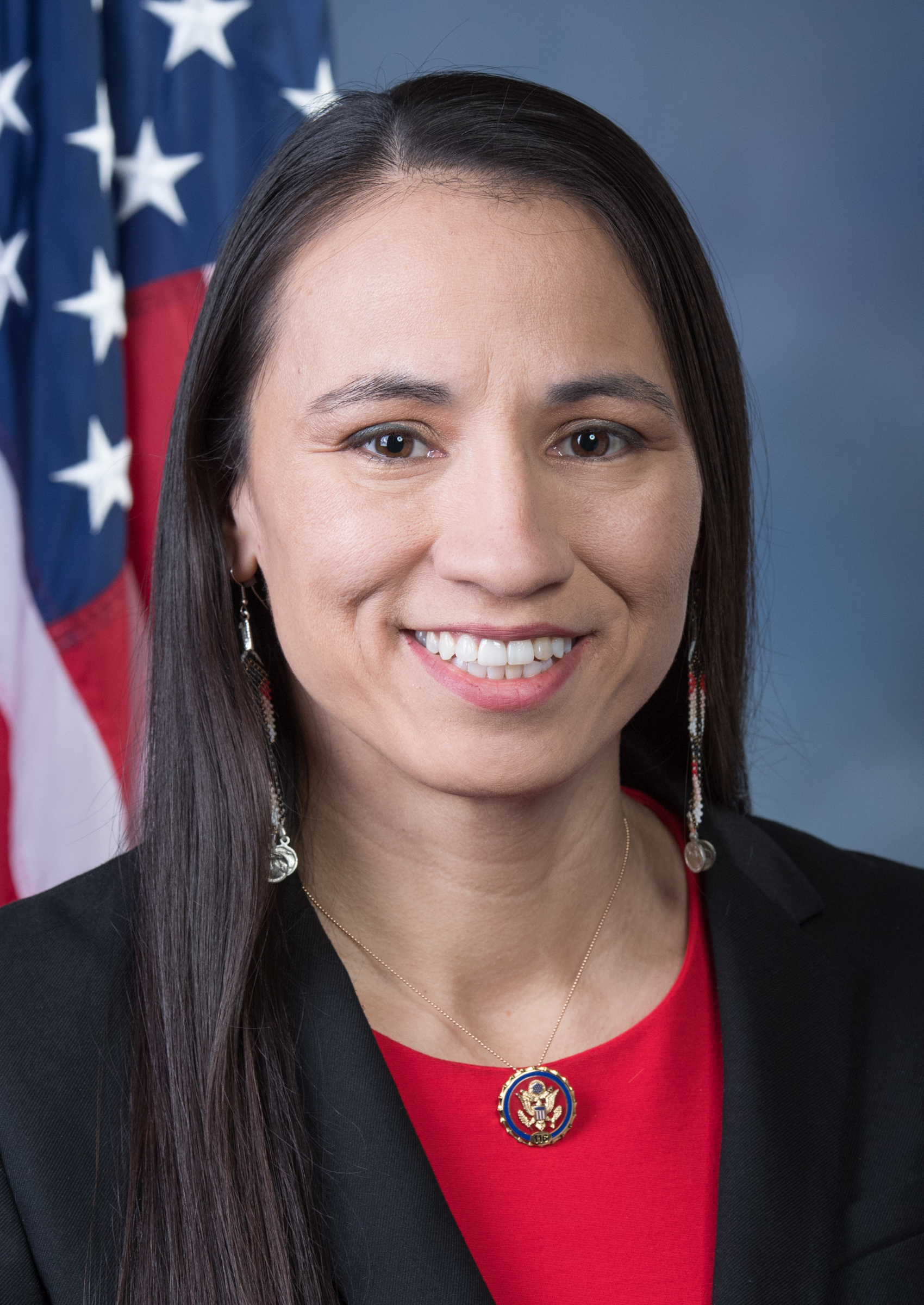

Nominee	Sharice Davids	Amanda Adkins
Party	Democratic	Republican
Popular vote	165,527	128,839
Percentage	54.9%	42.8%
- Davids: 40–50% 50–60% 60–70% 70–80% 80–90% >90% Adkins: 40–50% 50–60% 60–70% 70–80% 80–90% >90% Tie: 40–50% 50% No votes
U.S. Representative before election
Sharice Davids
Democratic
Elected U.S. Representative
Sharice Davids
Democratic

The 3rd district encompasses much of the Kansas City metropolitan area, including a portion of Kansas City, all of Johnson County, and several rural counties to the south and west. Incumbent Democrat Sharice Davids was reelected.

=== Democratic primary ===
==== Candidates ====
===== Nominee =====
- Sharice Davids, incumbent U.S. representative

==== Endorsements ====
Sharice Davids

Organizations

- American Israel Public Affairs Committee
- Brady Campaign
- Democratic Majority for Israel
- EMILY's List
- End Citizens United
- Equality PAC
- Feminist Majority PAC
- Giffords
- Humane Society of the United States Legislative Fund
- Jewish Democratic Council of America
- League of Conservation Voters
- LPAC
- NARAL Pro-Choice America
- National Women's Political Caucus
- Planned Parenthood Action Fund
- Sierra Club
- Women's Political Committee

==== Results ====
Democratic primary results
Party	Candidate	Votes	%
Democratic	Sharice Davids (incumbent)	103,945	100.0
Total votes		103,945	100.0

=== Republican primary ===
==== Candidates ====
===== Nominee =====
- Amanda Adkins, former chair of the Kansas Republican Party and nominee for this district in 2020

===== Eliminated in primary =====
- John McCaughrean, former Army intelligence analyst

==== Endorsements ====
Amanda Adkins

U.S. representatives

- Kevin McCarthy, U.S. representative for California's 23rd congressional district and House Minority Leader
- Elise Stefanik, U.S. representative for New York's 21st congressional district

Organizations

- Congressional Leadership Fund
- Maggie's List

==== Results ====
Republican primary results
Party	Candidate	Votes	%
Republican	Amanda Adkins	96,896	77.2
Republican	John McCaughrean	28,573	22.8
Total votes		125,469	100.0

=== Libertarian convention ===
==== Candidates ====
===== Nominee =====
- Steven Hohe, nominee for this district in 2016 and 2020

=== General election ===
==== Debate ====
2022 Kansas's 3rd U.S. House of Representatives debate
No.	Date	Host	Moderator	Link	Democratic	Republican
Key: P Participant A Absent N Not invited I Invited W Withdrawn						
Key: P Participant A Absent N Not invited I Invited W Withdrawn					Sharice Davids	Amanda Adkins
1	Oct. 21, 2022	KCPT; KCUR-FM; Shawnee Mission Post	Nick Haines		P	P

==== Predictions ====
Source	Ranking	As of
The Cook Political Report	Lean D	October 25, 2022
Inside Elections	Tilt D	September 23, 2022
Sabato's Crystal Ball	Lean D	November 2, 2022
Politico	Lean D	October 3, 2022
RCP	Tossup	October 26, 2022
Fox News	Lean D	November 1, 2022
DDHQ	Likely D	October 28, 2022
538	Likely D	October 27, 2022
The Economist	Likely D	November 1, 2022

==== Polling ====
Poll source	Date(s) administered	Sample size	Margin of error	Sharice Davids (D)	Amanda Adkins (R)	Other	Undecided
Siena College/The New York Times	October 19–24, 2022	431 (LV)	± 5.2%	55%	41%	2% (Note: Hohe with 2%)	2%
Jayhawk Consulting (Note: This poll was sponsored by Patrick Schmidt's campaign for Kansas's 2nd congressional district)	October 10–12, 2022	500 (LV)	–	47%	39%	–	14%
RMG Research	July 21–28, 2022	400 (LV)	± 4.9%	45%	46%	2%	8%

==== Results ====
2022 Kansas's 3rd congressional district election
Party	Candidate	Votes	%
Democratic	Sharice Davids (incumbent)	165,527	54.9
Republican	Amanda Adkins	128,839	42.8
Libertarian	Steve Hohe	6,928	2.3
Total votes		301,294	100.0
Democratic hold			

== District 4 ==
2022 Kansas's 4th congressional district election
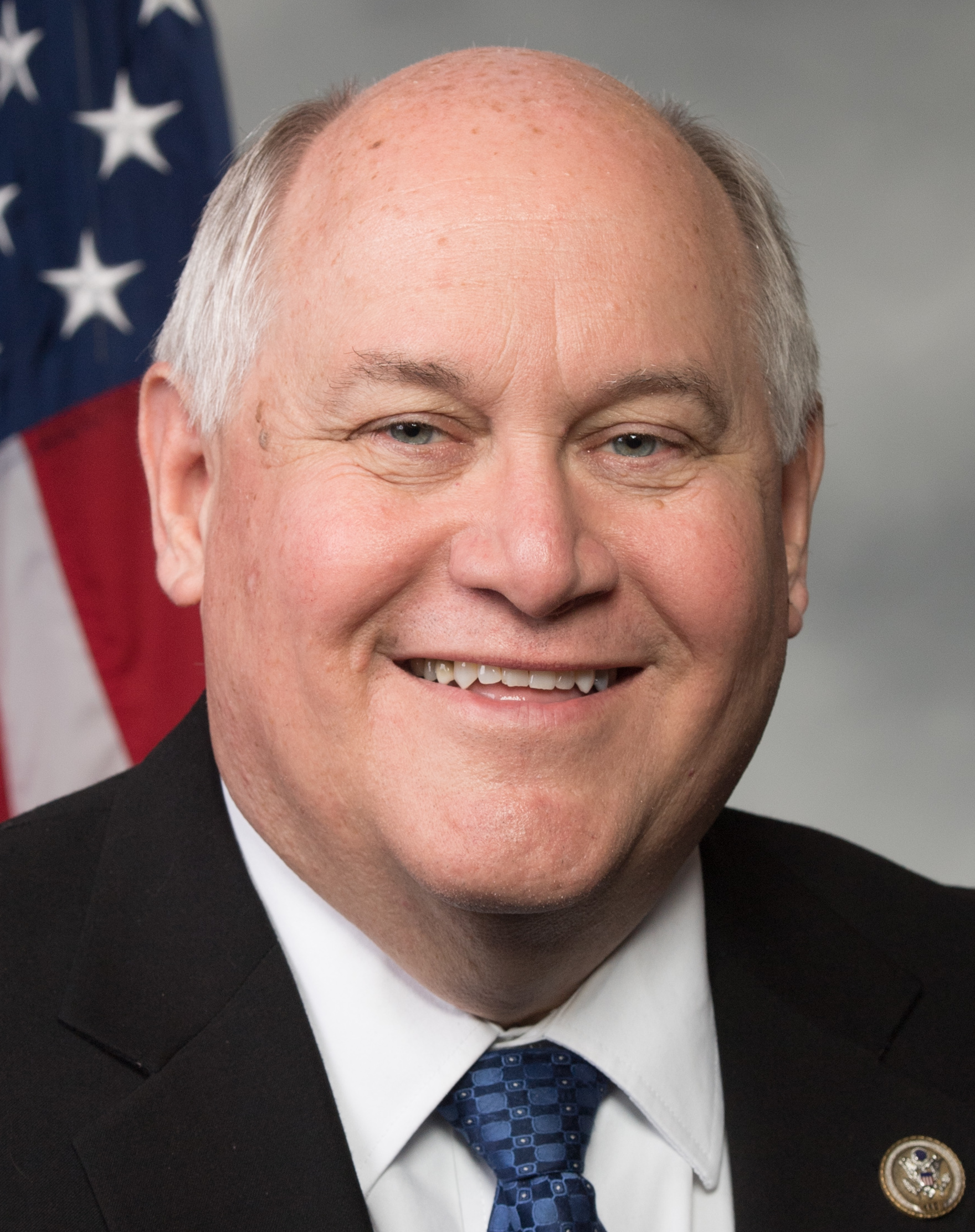

Nominee	Ron Estes	Bob Hernandez
Party	Republican	Democratic
Popular vote	144,889	83,851
Percentage	63.3%	36.7%
- Estes: 50–60% 60–70% 70–80% 80–90% >90% Hernandez: 50–60% 60–70% 70–80% 80–90% >90% Tie: 50% No votes
U.S. Representative before election
Ron Estes
Republican
Elected U.S. Representative
Ron Estes
Republican

The 4th district is located in south-central Kansas, taking in Wichita and the surrounding suburbs, including Derby and Newton, as well as rural neighboring areas. The incumbent was Republican Ron Estes, who was reelected with 63.7% of the vote in the previous version of this district in 2020.

=== Republican primary ===
==== Candidates ====
===== Nominee =====
- Ron Estes, incumbent U.S. representative

==== Results ====
Republican primary results
Party	Candidate	Votes	%
Republican	Ron Estes (incumbent)	102,915	100.0
Total votes		102,915	100.0

=== Democratic primary ===
==== Candidates ====
===== Nominee =====
- Bob Hernandez, U.S. Army veteran

==== Results ====
Democratic primary results
Party	Candidate	Votes	%
Democratic	Bob Hernandez	42,222	100.0
Total votes		42,222	100.0

=== General election ===
==== Predictions ====
Source	Ranking	As of
The Cook Political Report	Solid R	May 19, 2022
Inside Elections	Solid R	May 27, 2022
Sabato's Crystal Ball	Safe R	February 16, 2022
Politico	Solid R	April 5, 2022
RCP	Safe R	June 9, 2022
Fox News	Solid R	July 11, 2022
DDHQ	Solid R	July 20, 2022
538	Solid R	June 30, 2022
The Economist	Safe R	September 28, 2022

==== Results ====
2022 Kansas's 4th congressional district election
Party	Candidate	Votes	%
Republican	Ron Estes (incumbent)	144,889	63.3
Democratic	Bob Hernandez	83,851	36.7
Total votes		228,740	100.0
Republican hold			

== See also ==
- 2022 Kansas elections

== Notes ==
Partisan clients
