= 2022 Kansas Secretary of State election =

- November 8, 2022
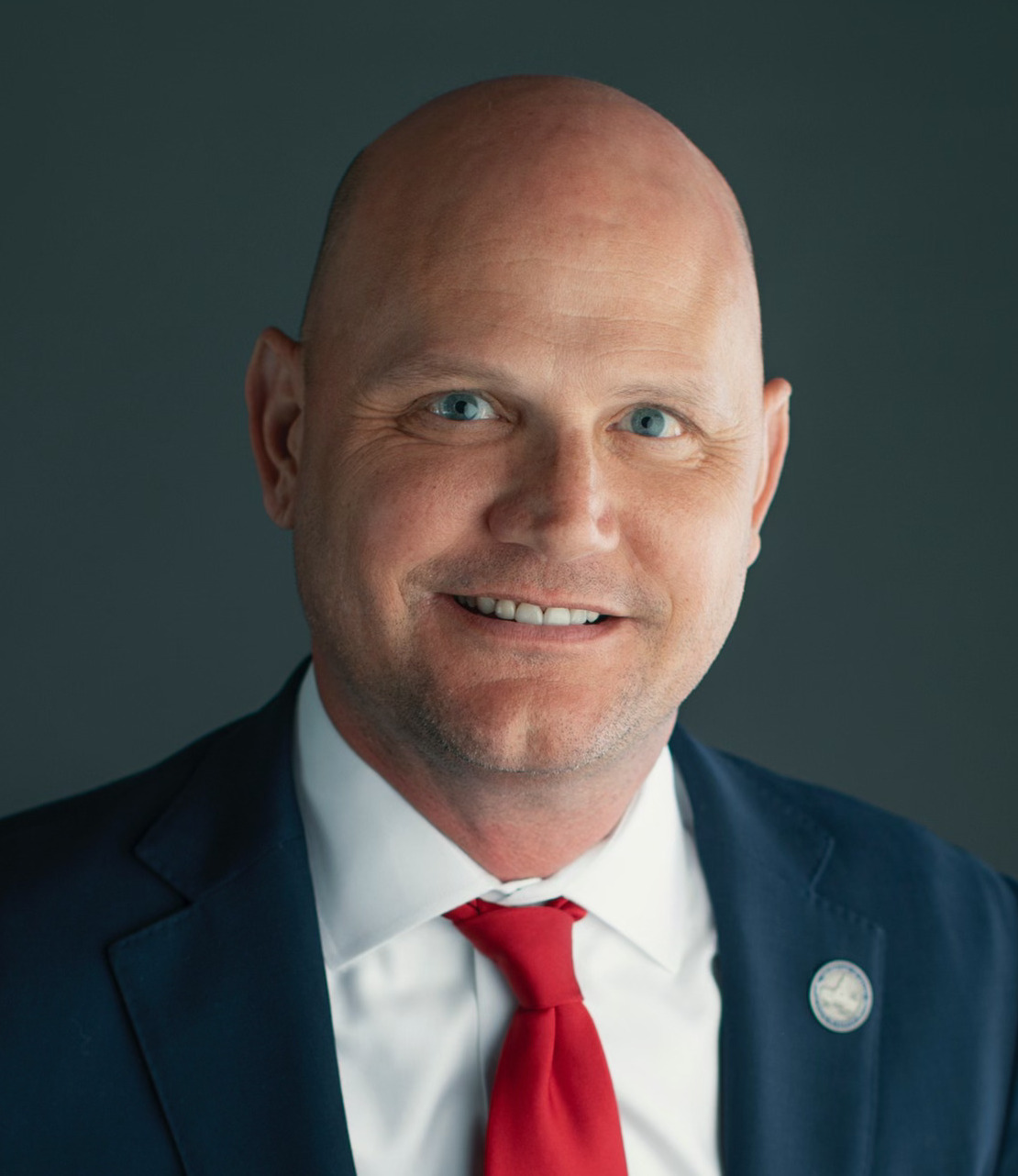

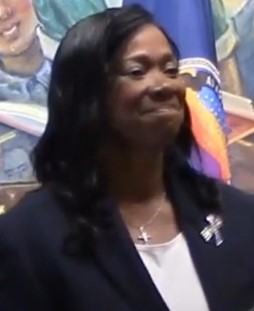
Nominee	Scott Schwab	Jeanna Repass
Party	Republican	Democratic
Popular vote	580,908	386,661
Percentage	58.36%	38.84%
- Schwab: 40–50% 50–60% 60–70% 70–80% 80–90% >90% Repass: 40–50% 50–60% 60–70% 70–80% 80–90% >90% Lang: 50–60% >90% Tie: 40–50% 50% No votes
Secretary of State before election
Scott Schwab
Republican
Elected Secretary of State
Scott Schwab
Republican

The 2022 Kansas Secretary of State election was held on November 8, 2022, to elect the Secretary of State of Kansas. Incumbent Republican Scott Schwab won re-election to a second term, defeating Democratic candidate Jeanna Repass with 58.4% of the vote.

== Republican primary ==
=== Candidates ===
==== Declared ====
- Mike Brown, former Johnson County Commissioner
- Scott Schwab, incumbent secretary of state

=== Endorsements ===
Scott Schwab

Organizations

- American Conservative Union

=== Results ===
Results by county Schwab: 50–60%; 60–70%; 70–80%; Brown: 50–60%; 60–70%

Republican primary results
Party	Candidate	Votes	%
Republican	Scott Schwab (incumbent)	245,998	55.24%
Republican	Mike Brown	199,316	44.76%
Total votes		445,314	100%

== Democratic primary ==
=== Candidates ===
==== Declared ====
- Jeanna Repass, church outreach director

=== Results ===
Democratic primary results
Party	Candidate	Votes	%
Democratic	Jeanna Repass	246,870	100%
Total votes		246,870	100%

== Libertarian convention ==
=== Candidates ===
==== Nominee ====
- Cullene Lang, veteran and perennial candidate

== General election ==
=== Debate ===
2022 Delaware U.S. House of Representatives debate
No.	Date	Host	Moderator	Link	Republican	Democratic
Key: P Participant A Absent N Not invited I Invited W Withdrawn						
Key: P Participant A Absent N Not invited I Invited W Withdrawn					Scott Schwab	Jeanna Repass
1	Nov. 1, 2022	KTWU; League of Women Voters of Kansas	Bob Beatty	YouTube	P	P

=== Predictions ===
Source	Ranking	As of
Sabato's Crystal Ball	Safe R	December 1, 2021
Elections Daily	Safe R	November 7, 2022

=== Results ===
2022 Kansas Secretary of State election
Party	Candidate	Votes	%	±%
Republican	Scott Schwab (incumbent)	580,908	58.36%	▲5.76
Democratic	Jeanna Repass	386,661	38.84%	▼5.03
Libertarian	Cullene Lang	27,844	2.80%	▼0.73
Total votes		995,413	100%	
Republican hold				

==== By congressional district ====
Schwab won all four congressional districts, including one that elected a Democrat.

District	Schwab	Repass	Representative
1st	66%	31%	Tracey Mann
2nd	59%	38%	Jake LaTurner
3rd	49%	48%	Sharice Davids
4th	62%	35%	Ron Estes

== See also ==
- 2022 Kansas elections
