= Kansas's 3rd congressional district =

U.S. House district for Kansas

Coordinates: 38.8°N 94.8°W

- Interactive map of district boundaries since January 3, 2023
- Representative: Sharice Davids; D–Roeland Park
- Distribution: 94.65% urban; 5.35% rural
- Population (2025): 761,455
- Median household income: $102,893
- Ethnicity: 75.0% White; 10.0% Hispanic; 4.9% Two or more races; 4.7% Asian; 4.6% Black; 0.7% other
- Cook PVI: D+2

Kansas's 3rd congressional district is a congressional district in the U.S. state of Kansas. Located in eastern Kansas, the district encompasses all of Anderson, Franklin, Johnson and Miami counties and parts of Wyandotte County. The district includes most of the Kansas side of the Kansas City metropolitan area, including all of Overland Park, Leawood, Lenexa, Shawnee, Gardner, and Olathe and parts of Kansas City. As currently drawn, the district is the wealthiest in the state.

The 3rd district is represented by Democrat Sharice Davids, who was first elected in 2018, defeating Republican incumbent Kevin Yoder. Reapportionment in 2022 altered the district's boundaries to add Anderson and Franklin counties and the part of Miami County that was not already in the 3rd congressional district. The southern part of Wyandotte County roughly along I-70 stayed in the district, while the area north of I-70 moved to the 2nd congressional district. With a Cook Partisan Voting Index rating of D+2, it is the only Kansas district that is not heavily Republican.

== History ==
=== 2000 demographics ===
Following redistricting after the 2000 U.S. census, there were 672,124 people, 258,439 households, and 173,022 families residing in the district. The population density was 864.4/mi^{2} over a land area of 778 square miles (2,020 km^{2}). There were 272,721 housing units at an average density of 350.7/mi^{2}. The racial makeup of the district is 82.70% White, 8.88% Black or African American, 2.60% Asian, 0.70% Native American, 0.04% Pacific Islander, 3.09% from other races, and 1.99% from two or more races. Hispanic or Latino of any race were 6.79% of the population.

There were 258,439 households, out of which 36.52% had children under the age of 18 living with them, 53.21% were married couples living together, 10.27% had a female householder with no husband present, and 33.05% were non-families. 26.12% of all households were made up of individuals, and 7.35% had someone living alone who was 65 years of age or older. The average household size was 2.55 and the average family size was 3.11.

In the district, the population distribution by age is 26.60% under the age of 18, 10.49% from 18 to 24, 31.65% from 25 to 44, 21.17% from 45 to 64, and 10.09% who were 65 years of age or older. The median age was 33.6 years. For every 100 females there were 95.78 males. For every 100 females age 18 and over, there were 92.54 males.

The median income for a household in the district is $51,118, and the median income for a family was $62,695. Males had a median income of $42,348 versus $30,353 for females. The per capita income for the district was $26,133. About 4.9% of families and 7.8% of the population were below the poverty line, including 8.7% of those under age 18 and 6.0% of those age 65 or over.

Among the population aged 16 years and older, 71.0% were in the civilian labor force and 0.1% were in the armed forces. Of the employed civilian workers, 12.8% were government workers and 5.6% were self-employed. Management, professional, and related occupations employed 41.5% of the workforce, and sales and office occupations an additional 28.8%. Only 0.2% were employed in farming, fishing, and forestry occupations. The largest employment by industry was: educational, health, and social services, 19.8%; professional, scientific, management, administrative, and waste management services, 12.0%; retail trade, 11.8%; and manufacturing, 10.4%. Agriculture, forestry, fishing and hunting, and mining industries only employed 0.4%.

The district's character is very different from the rest of Kansas, largely due to the influence of Kansas City and its suburbs. While Kansas's other congressional districts include significant rural territory, the 3rd is almost exclusively urban and suburban. As such, it is much friendlier to Democrats than the rest of the state. It was the only district in Kansas carried by Democrats in 2008, 2016, and 2020. The largest county, Johnson, has traditionally leaned Republican, though the brand of Republicanism practiced in the county has traditionally been a moderate one. The second-largest, Wyandotte, has long been one of the most Democratic counties in the state.

== 2020 redistricting ==
In recent years, as Eastern Kansas began to grow exponentially, the population has also increased, and has been voting more reliably Democratic. This led to Republican members of the Kansas House of Representatives and Kansas State Senate trying to gerrymander all four districts to be reliably Republican, with growing fears that Democrats could win a second seat as early as 2026 if they did not take action. Several skewed maps were drawn, but were not able to be passed due to a veto from the Democratic governor Laura Kelly. A somewhat less ambitious map was passed by the Kansas Legislature after several maps were vetoed, but critics say this map split notably Democratic Wyandotte County and separates it from Shawnee County, a county more closer regionally and demographically to Wyandotte County. The map was intended to draw Sharice Davids's seat out from under her. Nevertheless, Davids was reelected in 2022, after the map took effect. In 2024, Davids, defending against Republican challenger Prasanth Reddy, carried the district by 11 points.

== Composition ==
The 3rd district includes the entirety of the following counties, with the exception of Wyandotte; a portion of Kansas City is located within the 2nd district.

#	County	Seat	Population
3	Anderson	Garnett	7,838
59	Franklin	Ottawa	26,125
91	Johnson	Olathe	622,237
121	Miami	Paola	35,320
209	Wyandotte	Kansas City	165,281

== List of members representing the district ==
Member (District home)	Party	Years	Cong ress	Electoral history	District map
District created March 4, 1875
William Ripley Brown (Hutchinson)	Republican	March 4, 1875 – March 3, 1877	44th	Elected in 1874. Lost renomination.	
Thomas Ryan (Topeka)	Republican	March 4, 1877 – March 3, 1885	45th 46th 47th 48th	Elected in 1876. Re-elected in 1878. Re-elected in 1880. Re-elected in 1882. Redistricted to the 4th district.	
Bishop W. Perkins (Oswego)	Republican	March 4, 1885 – March 3, 1891	49th 50th 51st	Redistricted from the at-large district and re-elected in 1884. Re-elected in 1886. Re-elected in 1888. Lost re-election.	
Benjamin H. Clover (Cambridge)	Populist	March 4, 1891 – March 3, 1893	52nd	Elected in 1890. Retired.	
Thomas J. Hudson (Fredonia)	Populist	March 4, 1893 – March 3, 1895	53rd	Elected in 1892. Retired.	
Snyder S. Kirkpatrick (Fredonia)	Republican	March 4, 1895 – March 3, 1897	54th	Re-elected in 1894. Lost re-election.	
Edwin R. Ridgely (Pittsburg)	Populist	March 4, 1897 – March 3, 1901	55th 56th	Elected in 1896. Re-elected in 1898. Retired.	
Alfred M. Jackson (Winfield)	Democratic	March 4, 1901 – March 3, 1903	57th	Elected in 1900. Lost re-election.	
Philip P. Campbell (Pittsburg)	Republican	March 4, 1903 – March 3, 1923	58th 59th 60th 61st 62nd 63rd 64th 65th 66th 67th	Elected in 1902. Re-elected in 1904. Re-elected in 1906. Re-elected in 1908. Re-elected in 1910. Re-elected in 1912. Re-elected in 1914. Re-elected in 1916. Re-elected in 1918. Re-elected in 1920. Lost renomination.	
William H. Sproul (Sedan)	Republican	March 4, 1923 – March 3, 1931	68th 69th 70th 71st	Elected in 1922. Re-elected in 1924. Re-elected in 1926. Re-elected in 1928. Retired to Run for U.S. senator.	
Harold C. McGugin (Coffeyville)	Republican	March 4, 1931 – January 3, 1935	72nd 73rd	Elected in 1930. Re-elected in 1932. Lost re-election.	
Edward W. Patterson (Pittsburg)	Democratic	January 3, 1935 – January 3, 1939	74th 75th	Re-elected in 1934. Re-elected in 1936. Lost re-election.	
Thomas D. Winter (Girard)	Republican	January 3, 1939 – January 3, 1947	76th 77th 78th 79th	Elected in 1938. Re-elected in 1940. Re-elected in 1942. Re-elected in 1944. Lost renomination.	
Herbert A. Meyer (Independence)	Republican	January 3, 1947 – October 2, 1950	80th 81st	Elected in 1946. Re-elected in 1948. Died.	
Vacant		October 2, 1950 – November 7, 1950	81st		
Myron V. George (Altamont)	Republican	November 7, 1950 – January 3, 1959	81st 82nd 83rd 84th 85th	Elected in 1950 and seated early. Re-elected in 1952. Re-elected in 1954. Re-elected in 1956. Lost re-election.	
Denver D. Hargis (Coffeyville)	Democratic	January 3, 1959 – January 3, 1961	86th	Elected in 1958. Lost re-election.	
Walter Lewis McVey Jr. (Independence)	Republican	January 3, 1961 – January 3, 1963	87th	Elected in 1960. Lost renomination.	
Robert Ellsworth (Lawrence)	Republican	January 3, 1963 – January 3, 1967	88th 89th	Redistricted from the 2nd district and re-elected in 1962. Re-elected in 1964. Retired to run for U.S. senator.	
Larry Winn (Overland Park)	Republican	January 3, 1967 – January 3, 1985	90th 91st 92nd 93rd 94th 95th 96th 97th 98th	Elected in 1966. Re-elected in 1968. Re-elected in 1970. Re-elected in 1972. Re-elected in 1974. Re-elected in 1976. Re-elected in 1978. Re-elected in 1980. Re-elected in 1982. Retired.	
Jan Meyers (Overland Park)	Republican	January 3, 1985 – January 3, 1997	99th 100th 101st 102nd 103rd 104th	Elected in 1984. Re-elected in 1986. Re-elected in 1988. Re-elected in 1990. Re-elected in 1992. Re-elected in 1994. Retired.	
Vince Snowbarger (Olathe)	Republican	January 3, 1997 – January 3, 1999	105th	Elected in 1996. Lost re-election.	
Dennis Moore (Lenexa)	Democratic	January 3, 1999 – January 3, 2011	106th 107th 108th 109th 110th 111th	Elected in 1998. Re-elected in 2000. Re-elected in 2002. Re-elected in 2004. Re-elected in 2006. Re-elected in 2008. Retired.	
Dennis Moore (Lenexa)	Democratic	January 3, 1999 – January 3, 2011	106th 107th 108th 109th 110th 111th	Elected in 1998. Re-elected in 2000. Re-elected in 2002. Re-elected in 2004. Re-elected in 2006. Re-elected in 2008. Retired.	2003-2013
Kevin Yoder (Overland Park)	Republican	January 3, 2011 – January 3, 2019	112th 113th 114th 115th	Elected in 2010. Re-elected in 2012. Re-elected in 2014. Re-elected in 2016. Lost re-election.	2003-2013
Kevin Yoder (Overland Park)	Republican	January 3, 2011 – January 3, 2019	112th 113th 114th 115th	Elected in 2010. Re-elected in 2012. Re-elected in 2014. Re-elected in 2016. Lost re-election.	2013-2023
Sharice Davids (Roeland Park)	Democratic	January 3, 2019 – present	116th 117th 118th 119th	Elected in 2018. Re-elected in 2020. Re-elected in 2022. Re-elected in 2024. Re-elected in 2026.	2013-2023
Sharice Davids (Roeland Park)	Democratic	January 3, 2019 – present	116th 117th 118th 119th	Elected in 2018. Re-elected in 2020. Re-elected in 2022. Re-elected in 2024. Re-elected in 2026.	2023–present

== Recent election results from statewide races ==
Year	Office	Results
2008	President	McCain 54% - 45%
2008	Senate	Roberts 59% - 41%
2012	President	Romney 57% - 40%
2016	President	Trump 48% - 43%
2016	Senate	Moran 56% - 38%
2018	Governor	Kelly 54% - 39%
2018	Secretary of State	Schwab 49% - 48%
2018	Attorney General	Schmidt 50.5% - 49.5%
2018	Treasurer	LaTurner 50.3% - 49.7%
2020	President	Biden 51% - 47%
2020	Senate	Bollier 50% - 45%
2022	Senate	Moran 50% - 47%
2022	Governor	Kelly 57% - 40%
2022	Secretary of State	Schwab 49% - 48%
2022	Attorney General	Mann 59% - 41%
2022	Treasurer	Rogers 49% - 45%
2024	President	Harris 51% - 47%

== Recent election results ==
=== 2002 ===
Kansas's 3rd congressional district election (2002)
Party	Candidate	Votes	%
Democratic	Dennis Moore (incumbent)	107,931	50.16
Republican	Adam Taff	100,999	46.93
Reform	Dawn Bly	4,934	2.29
Libertarian	Doug Martin	1,328	0.62
Total votes		215,192	100.00
Turnout			
Democratic hold			

=== 2004 ===
Kansas's 3rd congressional district election (2004)
Party	Candidate	Votes	%
Democratic	Dennis Moore (incumbent)	184,050	54.82
Republican	Kris Kobach	145,542	43.35
Libertarian	Joe Bellis	3,191	0.95
Reform	Richard Wells	2,956	0.88
Total votes		335,739	100.00
Turnout			
Democratic hold			

=== 2006 ===
Kansas's 3rd congressional district election (2006)
Party	Candidate	Votes	%
Democratic	Dennis Moore (incumbent)	149,480	64.47
Republican	Chuck Ahner	78,446	33.84
Reform	Robert A. Conroy	3,925	1.69
Total votes		231,851	100.00
Turnout			
Democratic hold			

=== 2008 ===
Kansas's 3rd congressional district election (2008)
Party	Candidate	Votes	%
Democratic	Dennis Moore (incumbent)	202,541	56.44
Republican	Nick Jordan	142,307	39.66
Libertarian	Joe Bellis	10,073	2.81
Reform	Roger Tucker	3,937	1.10
Total votes		358,858	100.00
Turnout			
Democratic hold			

=== 2010 ===
Kansas's 3rd congressional district election (2010)
Party	Candidate	Votes	%
Republican	Kevin Yoder	136,246	58.40
Democratic	Stephene Moore	90,193	38.66
Libertarian	Jasmin Talbert	6,846	2.94
Total votes		233,285	100.00
Turnout			
Republican gain from Democratic			

=== 2012 ===
Kansas's 3rd congressional district election (2012)
Party	Candidate	Votes	%
Republican	Kevin Yoder (incumbent)	201,087	68.5
Libertarian	Joel Balam	92,675	31.5
Total votes		293,762	100
Republican hold			

=== 2014 ===
Kansas's 3rd congressional district election (2014)
Party	Candidate	Votes	%
Republican	Kevin Yoder (incumbent)	134,493	60.02
Democratic	Kelly Kultala	89,584	39.98
Total votes		224,077	100
Republican hold			

=== 2016 ===
Kansas's 3rd congressional district election (2016)
Party	Candidate	Votes	%
Republican	Kevin Yoder (incumbent)	176,022	51.3
Democratic	Jay Sidie	139,300	40.6
Libertarian	Steve Hohe	27,791	8.1
Total votes		343,113	100
Republican hold			

=== 2018 ===
Kansas's 3rd congressional district election (2018)
Party	Candidate	Votes	%
Democratic	Sharice Davids	164,253	53.3
Republican	Kevin Yoder (incumbent)	136,104	44.2
Libertarian	Chris Clemmons	7,643	2.5
Total votes		308,000	100
Democratic gain from Republican			

=== 2020 ===
Kansas's 3rd congressional district election (2020)
Party	Candidate	Votes	%
Democratic	Sharice Davids (incumbent)	220,049	53.6
Republican	Amanda Adkins	178,773	43.6
Libertarian	Steven Hohe	11,596	2.8
Total votes		410,418	100
Democratic hold			

=== 2022 ===
Kansas's 3rd congressional district election (2022)
Party	Candidate	Votes	%
Democratic	Sharice Davids (incumbent)	165,527	54.9
Republican	Amanda Adkins	128,839	42.8
Libertarian	Steve Hohe	6,928	2.3
Total votes		301,294	100
Democratic hold			

=== 2024 ===
Kansas's 3rd congressional district election (2024)
Party	Candidate	Votes	%
Democratic	Sharice Davids (incumbent)	209,871	53.4
Republican	Prasanth Reddy	167,570	42.6
Libertarian	Steve Roberts	15,892	4.0
Total votes		393,333	100
Democratic hold			

== Historical district boundaries ==
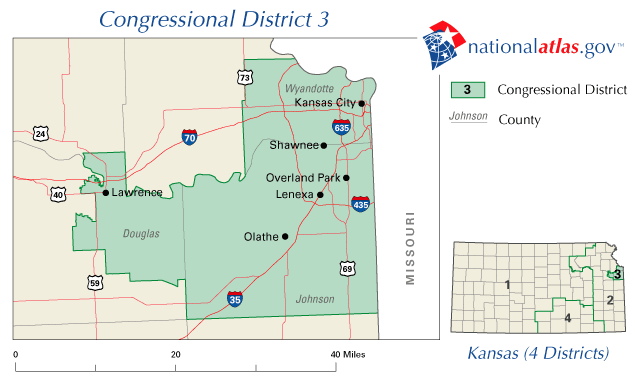
2003 – 2013

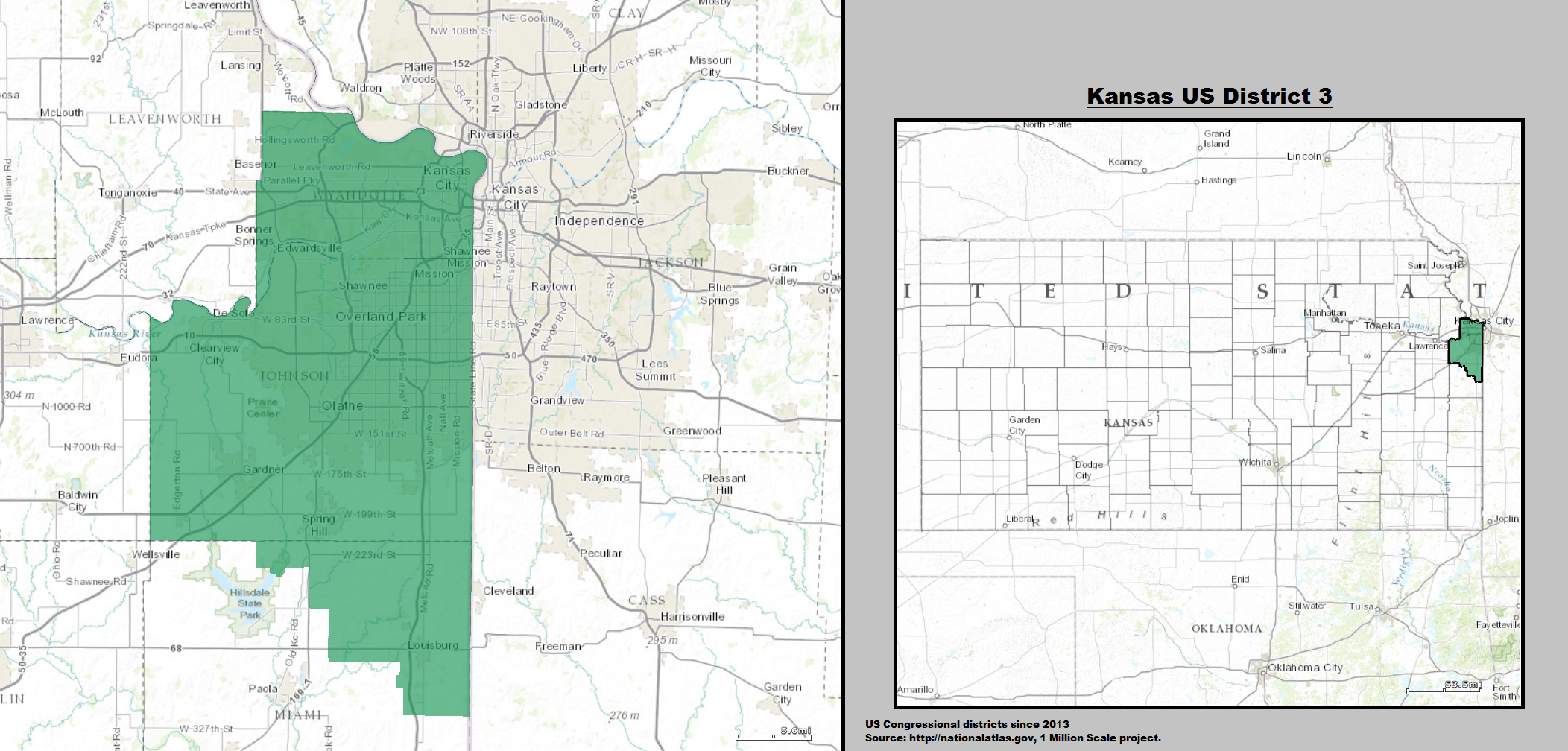
2013 - 2023

== See also ==
- Kansas's congressional delegations
- Kansas's congressional districts
- List of United States congressional districts
