= Kelly Arnold =

American politician (born 1978)

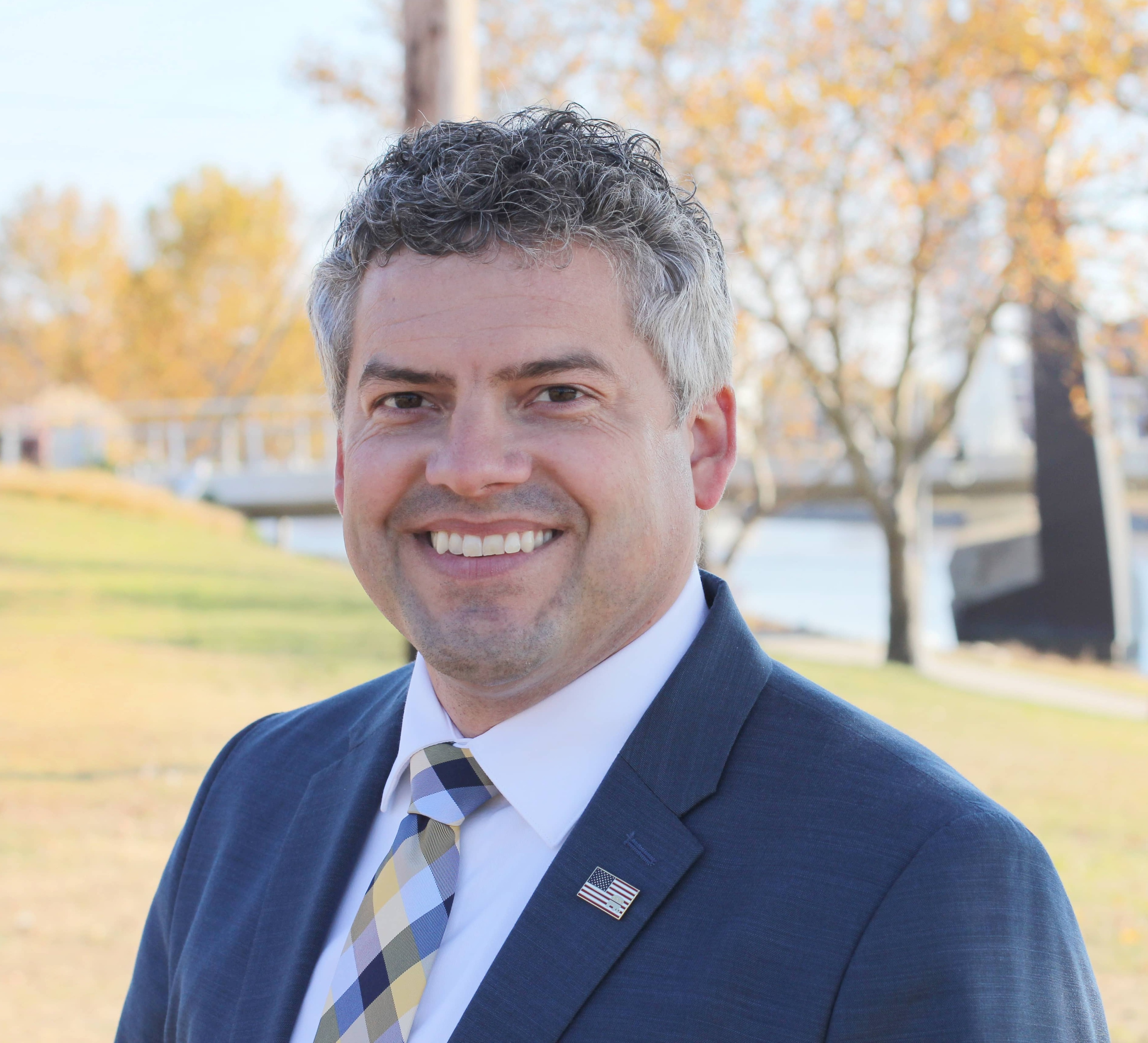
- Arnold in 2017

66th Chair of the Kansas Republican Party
- In office January 26, 2013 – February 16, 2019
- Preceded by: Amanda Adkins
- Succeeded by: Mike Kuckelman

Personal details
- Born: April 12, 1978 (age 48) McPherson, Kansas, U.S.
- Party: Republican
- Education: Tabor College, Kansas (BS); Wichita State University (MPA)
- Occupation: Politician
- Website: Official website

Kelly Arnold (born April 12, 1978) is an American politician serving as the Sedgwick County Clerk. He is in his fifth term, having first been elected in 2008. From January 2013 to February 2019, Kelly served as the chairman of the Kansas Republican Party.

== Early life and education ==
Kelly Arnold was born and raised in McPherson, Kansas. After he graduated from McPherson High School, he earned bachelor degrees in Business Management and Finance from Tabor College in Hillsboro. He later graduated from Wichita State University's Hugo Wall School of Public Affairs as Certified Master County Clerk.

== Career ==
Arnold worked in the finance industry before his 2008 election to the office of Sedgwick County Clerk. He ran unopposed in 2012 and 2016. He is responsible for private and commercial filings. He is a member of the Executive Committee for South Central Kansas of the County Clerks & Election Officials.

Arnold is former chairman of the board of trustees of the Kansas Public Employee Retirement System and the Board of Directors at Hillsboro State Bank.

=== Political career ===
From January 2013 to February 2019, Arnold served as Chairman of the Kansas Republican Party (KSGOP). In February 2017, Arnold won a third term to chair the KSGOP. Previously, Arnold had been state vice chairman and Finance Director of the KSGOP. Prior to that he had chaired the Sedgwick County Republican Party between 2006 and 2010.

Arnold served for over ten years in the Young Republican National Federation, two years of which as treasurer of the Federation and is also a co-founder of the Republican Men's Leadership Series.

In 2016, Arnold was part of the Convention Rules Committee and the Committee on Arrangements for the 2016 Republican National Convention. Later in the year, he was also one of the state's presidential electors receiving over 20,000 emails from anti-Trump activists.

In June 2017, Arnold weighed a run for the office of Secretary of State of Kansas. In early 2018, opted to focus on his role as party chairman and did not launch a primary campaign.

In 2020, Arnold ran against Democratic nominee Kelli Reid for Sedgwick County Clerk. He won the election with 58.8% of the votes. Arnold ran for the position again in 2024 with no opposition from the democratic party, winning the election with 99.1% of the votes.

== Personal life ==
Arnold lives in Wichita, Kansas.

Party political offices
Preceded by Amanda Adkins	Chairman of the Kansas Republican Party; 2013–2019	Succeeded by Mike Kuckelman
