= Scott Schwab =

American politician (born 1972)

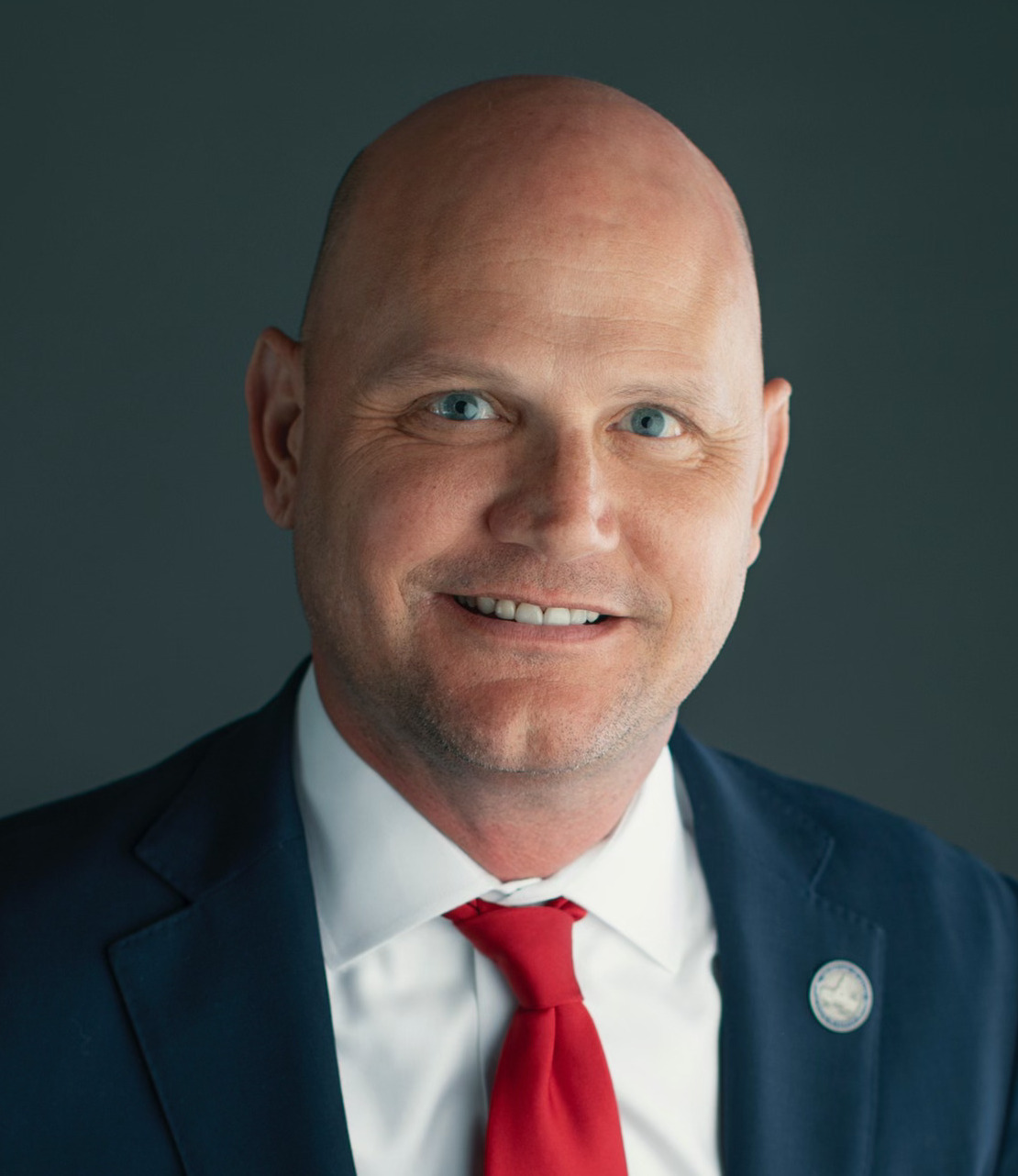
- Official portrait, 2022

32nd Secretary of State of Kansas
- Incumbent
- Assumed office January 14, 2019
- Governor: Laura Kelly
- Preceded by: Kris Kobach

Speaker pro tempore of the Kansas House of Representatives
- In office January 9, 2017 – January 14, 2019
- Preceded by: Peggy Mast
- Succeeded by: Blaine Finch

Member of the Kansas House of Representatives from the 49th district
- In office May 27, 2008 – January 14, 2019
- Preceded by: Benjamin Hodge
- Succeeded by: Megan Lynn
- In office January 13, 2003 – January 8, 2007
- Preceded by: Dennis Pyle
- Succeeded by: Benjamin Hodge

Personal details
- Born: Scott Joseph Schwab; July 9, 1972 (age 54) Great Bend, Kansas, U.S.
- Party: Republican
- Spouse: Michele
- Children: 4 (1 deceased)
- Education: Fort Hays State University (BA)

Scott Joseph Schwab (born July 9, 1972) is an American politician serving as the 32nd secretary of state of Kansas since 2019. A member of the Republican Party, Schwab previously served as a member of the Kansas House of Representatives, representing the 49th district. He was a candidate in the 2026 Kansas gubernatorial election but did not advance from the Republican primary.

== Early life ==
In 1994, Schwab earned a Bachelor of Arts from Fort Hays State University. After college, he worked as an agent for the Kansas Farm Bureau until 1999. He worked in the sales field until 2010, and then became the executive vice president of CompDME.

== Political career ==
=== Kansas House of Representatives ===
Schwab began serving as a member of the Kansas House of Representatives in June 2003. In 2004, he won the primary in the Republican district with 69.1% of the vote against Shannon Giles.

In 2006, he chose to run in the Republican primary for the 3rd congressional district, a seat held at that time by four-term Democratic incumbent Dennis Moore. Schwab faced banker Chuck Ahner of Overland Park, Thomas Scherer of Merriam and Paul Showen of Shawnee. Schwab lost the primary, taking 32.5% of the vote to Ahner's 51.9%. Benjamin B. Hodge won the Republican primary for the District 49 seat with 52.7% of the vote, and succeeded Schwab in the state House. However, Hodge resigned before the end of his term, and Schwab was appointed to finish out the session.

In 2008, Schwab ran again for his old 49th District seat, was unopposed in the primary, and defeated Democrat Kristi Boone in the general election.

=== Kansas Secretary of State ===
In 2017, Schwab announced that he would be a candidate for Kansas Secretary of State in the 2018 election. He said he was not interested in rolling back voting standards supported by then-incumbent Secretary of State Kris Kobach and that his experience as House Speaker pro tem and as chair of the elections and insurance committees qualified him for the position.

During his tenure as Secretary of State, Schwab maintained that there was no issue with voter fraud or election security in the state of Kansas, a position at odds with that of the U.S. president, the then 45th, Donald Trump. Schwab rejected conspiracy theories and distrust of elections from within the Republican Party after the 2020 election. Schwab filed to run for reelection in 2022 and won the GOP nomination, defeating a primary challenge from former Johnson County commissioner Mike Brown by 55% to 45%. He won re-election that November, defeating Democratic nominee Jeanna Repass.

=== 2026 Kansas gubernatorial campaign ===
Schwab was a candidate for the Republican nomination in the 2026 gubernatorial election in Kansas, but did not win the primary.

== Personal life ==
Schwab's 10-year-old son, Caleb, died after being decapitated on August 7, 2016, in an accident on the Verrückt water slide at the Schlitterbahn Kansas City waterpark. The family received a reported $20 million settlement.

In March 2018, Schlitterbahn and three current or former employees were indicted by the Kansas Attorney General on charges related to Caleb's death. The charges against the defendants were dismissed due to prosecutorial misconduct with the grand jury. After the death of his son, Schwab supported additional government regulations on the inspection of water parks. Schwab and his wife, Michele, have three surviving children.

In March 2025, Schwab announced that he had been diagnosed with lung cancer and would be undergoing treatment.

Kansas House of Representatives
Preceded by Peggy Mast	Speaker pro tempore of the Kansas House of Representatives; 2017–2019	Succeeded by Blaine Finch
Party political offices
Preceded by Kris Kobach	Republican nominee for Secretary of State of Kansas; 2018, 2022	Succeeded by Pat Proctor
Political offices
Preceded by Kris Kobach	Secretary of State of Kansas; 2019–present	Incumbent
