= Mike Kuckelman =

American politician

Chairman of the Kansas Republican Party
- In office February 16, 2019 – February 11, 2023
- Preceded by: Kelly Arnold
- Succeeded by: Mike Brown

Personal details
- Party: Republican
- Education: Washburn University (BBA, JD)

Mike Kuckelman is an American lawyer and politician from Kansas. He served as the chairman of the Kansas Republican Party from February 2019 to February 2023.

== Early life ==
A Catholic, Kuckelman attended the private Maur Hill Prep School. Kuckelman then attended Washburn University, receiving a BBA in accounting in 1986. He then attended the Washburn University School of Law, receiving a J.D. and admittance to the Kansas Bar in 1990. He then began his legal career first working as an associate at the law firm Blackwell Sanders (now Husch Blackwell) and later as a partner at the law firm Kuckelman-Torline-Kirkland. He specialized in European litigation, spending most of his time in London and was one of the lead attorneys appointed by the United States District Court for the Southern District of New York to litigate the World Trade Center cases after the September 11 attacks.

== Political career ==
=== Chairman of the Kansas Republican Party ===
Kuckelman became chairman of the Kansas Republican Party in February 2019 promising to continue the advancement of Republican principles. He was heavily involved in the 2022 Kansas gubernatorial election against Democratic governor Laura Kelly and promising to defeat her soundly. However, partly due to his presumptive support for Schmidt in the Republican primary and Senator Dennis Pyle changing party affiliation and obtaining enough signatures to file for the governor seat as an Independent, Derek Schmidt, the Republican Party candidate for the governor's office was defeated with 47.3% to Kelly's 49.5%. He also lost the 3rd congressional seat to a Democrat for the first time since 1963. He failed to overturn that in 2020. He did not seek another term, actively campaigned against, and was replaced by Mike Brown in February 2023.

=== Other offices ===
Kuckelman was selected as a delegate to the 2016, 2020 and most recently as an alternate to the 2024 Republican National Conventions. He also acted as a spokesman for Kansas City's, and by extension the whole Kansas City metropolitan area's unsuccessful bid to host the 2024 convention.

Party political offices
| Preceded by Kelly Arnold | Chairman of the Kansas Republican Party; 2019–2023 | Succeeded by Mike Brown |
