= 2026 United States House of Representatives elections in Kansas =

- November 3, 2026

All 4 Kansas seats to the United States House of Representatives
	Majority party	Minority party
Party	Republican	Democratic
Last election	3	1
Seats won	3	1
Seat change	Steady	Steady
Popular vote	546,411	523,002
Percentage	49.73%	47.60%
Swing	▼7.66%	▲7.30%

Republican
40–50%
50–60%
60–70%
70–80%
80–90%
90–100%
Democratic
40–50%
50–60%
60–70%
70–80%

The 2026 United States House of Representatives elections in Kansas were held on November 3, 2026, to elect the four U.S. representatives from the State of Kansas, one from each of the state's congressional districts. The elections coincided with other elections to the House of Representatives, elections to the United States Senate, and various state and local elections. The primary elections were held on August 4, 2026.

== Failed redistricting attempt ==
Republican Kansas state legislators announced a plan to call a special session to redraw the 3rd congressional district, but lacked the necessary support in the House, due to veto power from governor Laura Kelly.

== District 1 ==
2026 Kansas's 1st congressional district election
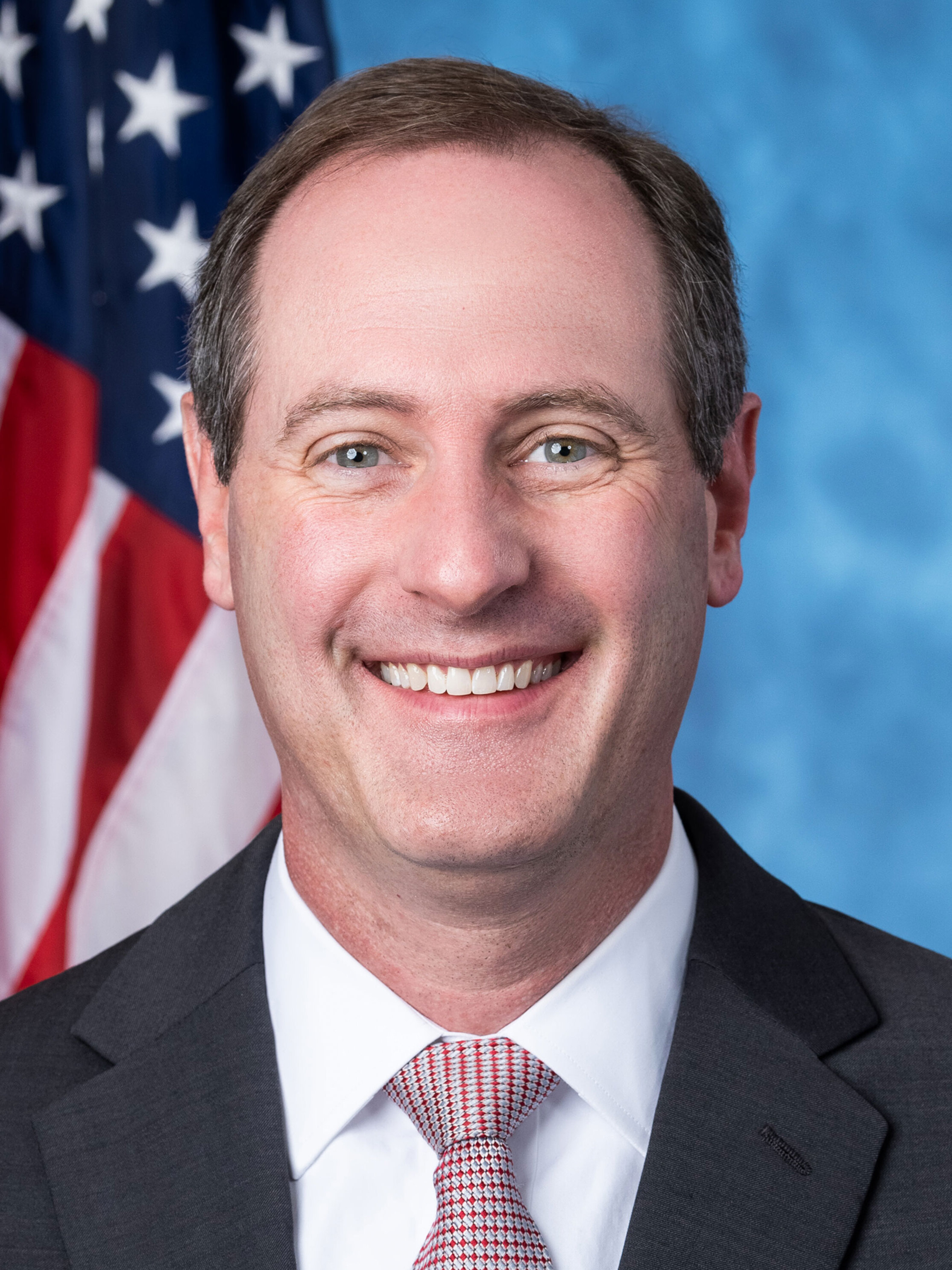

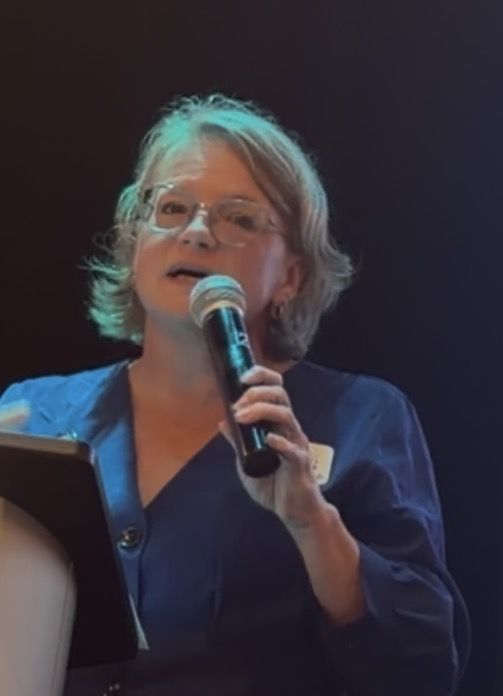
Nominee	Tracey Mann	Lauren Reinhold
Party	Republican	Democratic
Popular vote	151,805	97,628
Percentage	59.2%	38.1%
- County results Mann: 50–60% 60–70% 70–80% 80–90% 90–100% Reinhold: 50–60% 70–80%
U.S. Representative before election
Tracey Mann
Republican
Elected U.S. Representative
Tracey Mann
Republican

The 1st district encompasses all or part of 60 counties, spanning more than half the state, making it the seventh-largest district in the nation that does not cover an entire state. Located within the district are Manhattan, Salina, Dodge City, Garden City, Hays, McPherson, Hutchinson, and Lawrence. The incumbent is Republican Tracey Mann, who was re-elected with 69.1% of the vote in 2024.

=== Republican primary ===
==== Candidates ====
===== Nominee =====
- Tracey Mann, incumbent U.S. representative

===== Eliminated in primary =====
- Craig Musser

==== Endorsements ====
Tracey Mann

Executive branch officials

- Donald Trump, 45th and 47th president of the United States (2017–2021, 2025–present)

Organizations

- AIPAC
- National Rifle Association Political Victory Fund

==== Fundraising ====
Campaign finance reports as of March 31, 2026
Candidate	Raised	Spent	Cash on hand
Tracey Mann (R)	$1,220,355	$415,222	$2,558,830
Source: Federal Election Commission

==== Results ====
Republican primary results
Party	Candidate	Votes	%
Republican	Tracey Mann (incumbent)	74,523	81.0
Republican	Craig Musser	17,468	19.0
Total votes		91,991	100.0

=== Democratic primary ===
==== Candidates ====
===== Nominee =====
- Lauren Reinhold, former federal employee

===== Eliminated in primary =====
- Colin McRoberts, professor at the University of Kansas School of Business

==== Fundraising ====
Campaign finance reports as of March 31, 2026
Candidate	Raised	Spent	Cash on hand
Colin McRoberts (D)	$40,748	$32,967	$7,781
Lauren Reinhold (D)	$23,710	$14,952	$8,758
Source: Federal Election Commission

==== Results ====
Democratic primary results
Party	Candidate	Votes	%
Democratic	Lauren Reinhold	25,074	64.1
Democratic	Colin McRoberts	14,021	35.9
Total votes		39,095	100.0

=== Third-party and independent candidates ===
==== Nominee ====
- Steven Jacob (Libertarian)

==== Withdrawn ====
- Craig Musser (United Kansas), certified safety professional

=== General election ===
==== Predictions ====
Source	Ranking	As of
Decision Desk HQ	Safe R	July 14, 2026
The Cook Political Report	Solid R	May 29, 2025
Inside Elections	Solid R	May 29, 2025
Sabato's Crystal Ball	Safe R	May 29, 2025

==== Post-primary endorsements ====
Lauren Reinhold (D)

Labor unions

- National Education Association

==== Fundraising ====
Campaign finance reports as of July 15, 2026
Candidate	Raised	Spent	Cash on hand
Tracey Mann (R)	$1,488,465	$528,838	$2,713,324
Lauren Reinhold (D)	$40,651	$37,490	$3,162
Source: Federal Election Commission

==== Results ====
2026 Kansas's 1st congressional district election
Party	Candidate	Votes	%	±%
Republican	Tracey Mann (incumbent)	151,805	59.2	–9.9
Democratic	Lauren Reinhold	97,628	38.1	+7.2
Libertarian	Steven Jacob	6,978	2.7	–2.0
Total votes		256,411	100	

== District 2 ==
2026 Kansas's 2nd congressional district election
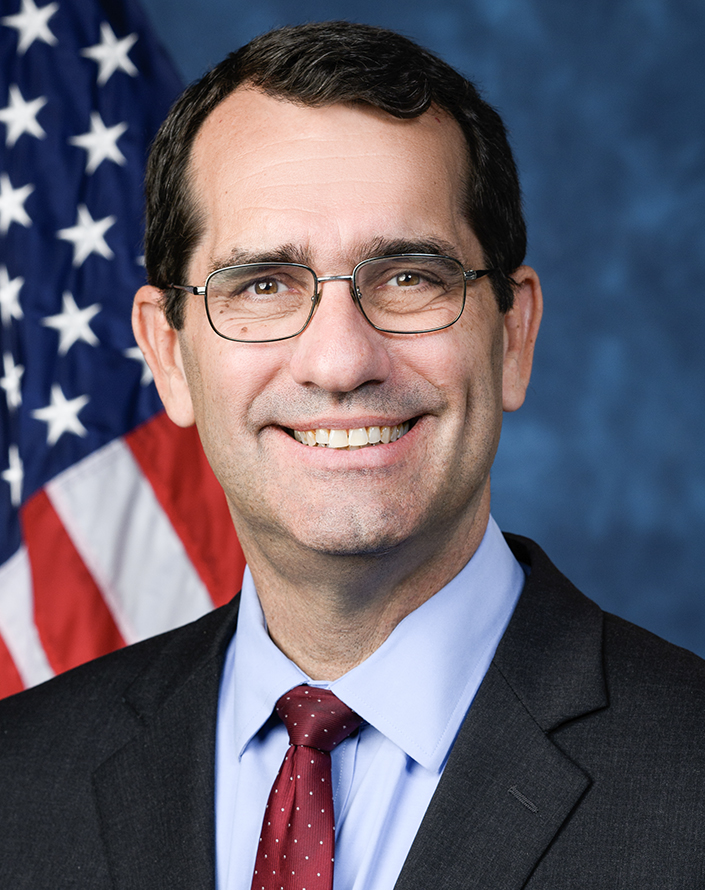

Nominee	Derek Schmidt	Don Coover
Party	Republican	Democratic
Popular vote	126,915	112,365
Percentage	51.0%	45.2%
- County results Schmidt: 40–50% 50–60% 60–70% 70–80% 80–90% Coover: 40–50% 50–60% 70–80%
U.S. Representative before election
Derek Schmidt
Republican
Elected U.S. Representative
Derek Schmidt
Republican

The 2nd district stretches across much of eastern Kansas from Nebraska to Oklahoma, including the cities of Topeka, Emporia, Junction City and Pittsburg, as well as portions of Kansas City and Lawrence. The incumbent is Republican Derek Schmidt, who was elected with 57.1% of the vote in 2024.

=== Republican primary ===
==== Candidates ====
===== Nominee =====
- Derek Schmidt, incumbent U.S. representative

===== Eliminated in primary =====
- Chad Young, candidate for this district in 2024

==== Endorsements ====
Derek Schmidt

Executive branch officials

- Donald Trump, 45th and 47th president of the United States (2017–2021, 2025–present)

Organizations

- AIPAC
- Kansas State Council of Fire Fighters
- National Rifle Association Political Victory Fund

==== Fundraising ====
Campaign finance reports as of March 31, 2026
Candidate	Raised	Spent	Cash on hand
Derek Schmidt (R)	$989,112	$339,810	$687,803
Source: Federal Election Commission

==== Results ====
Republican primary results
Party	Candidate	Votes	%
Republican	Derek Schmidt (incumbent)	62,969	79.9
Republican	Chad Young	15,845	20.1
Total votes		78,814	100.0

=== Democratic primary ===
==== Candidates ====
===== Nominee =====
- Don Coover, veterinarian

===== Disqualified =====
- Braeden Curwick

==== Fundraising ====
Campaign finance reports as of March 31, 2026
Candidate	Raised	Spent	Cash on hand
Don Coover (D)	$517,670	$332,707	$184,963
Braeden Curwick (D)	$231	$181	$90
Source: Federal Election Commission

==== Results ====
Democratic primary results
Party	Candidate	Votes	%
Democratic	Don Coover	38,737	100.0
Total votes		38,737	100.0

=== Third-party and independent candidates ===
==== Nominee ====
- John Hauer (Libertarian)

=== General election ===
==== Predictions ====
Source	Ranking	As of
Decision Desk HQ	Likely R	July 14, 2026
The Cook Political Report	Likely R	October 16, 2026
Inside Elections	Likely R	October 29, 2026
Sabato's Crystal Ball	Likely R	October 20, 2026

==== Post-primary endorsements ====
Derek Schmidt (R)

Organizations

- U.S. Chamber of Commerce
Don Coover (D)

U.S. representatives

- Adam Gray, CA-13 (2025–present)

Statewide officials

- Laura Kelly, governor of Kansas (2019–present)

Labor unions

- National Education Association

Organizations

- Blue Dog PAC

==== Fundraising ====
Campaign finance reports as of October 14, 2026
Candidate	Raised	Spent	Cash on hand
Derek Schmidt (R)	$1,772,989	$1,353,904	$457,586
Don Coover (D)	$1,363,193	$1,131,518	$231,676
Source: Federal Election Commission

==== Polling ====
Poll source	Date(s) administered	Sample size (Note: Key: A – all adults RV – registered voters LV – likely voters V – unclear)	Margin of error	Derek Schmidt (R)	Don Coover (D)	Undecided
DCCC	October 19–20, 2026	639 (LV)	± 3.9%	49%	46%	6%

==== Results ====
2026 Kansas's 2nd congressional district election
Party	Candidate	Votes	%	±%
Republican	Derek Schmidt (incumbent)	126,915	51.0	–6.1
Democratic	Don Coover	112,365	45.2	+7.0
Libertarian	John Hauer	9,404	3.8	–0.9
Total votes		248,684	100	

== District 3 ==
2026 Kansas's 3rd congressional district election
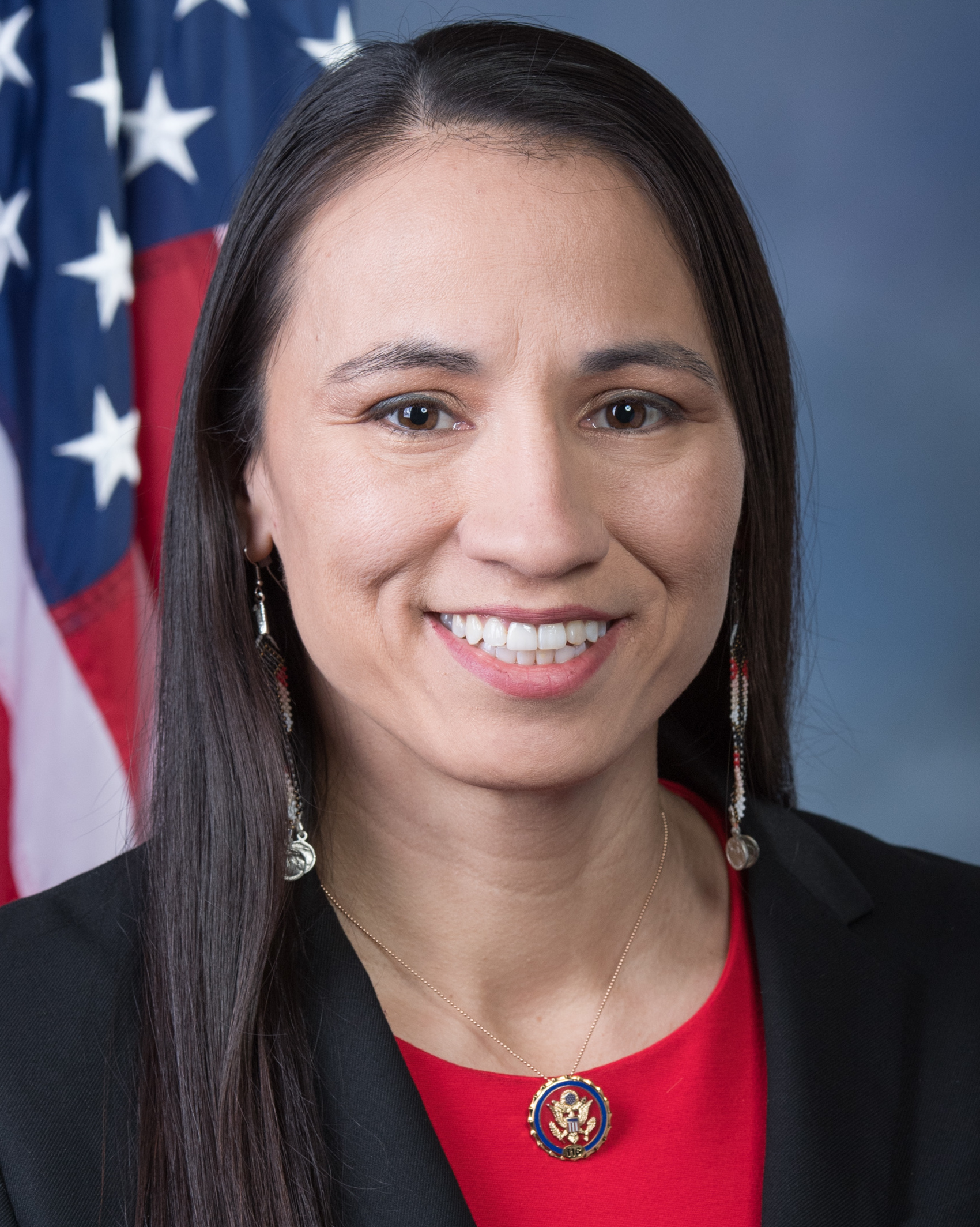

Nominee	Sharice Davids	Eric Jenkins
Party	Democratic	Republican
Popular vote	204,626	131,418
Percentage	59.6%	38.3%
- County results Davids: 60–70% Jenkins: 50–60% 70–80%
U.S. Representative before election
Sharice Davids
Democratic
Elected U.S. Representative
Sharice Davids
Democratic

The 3rd district encompasses much of the Kansas City metropolitan area, including a portion of Kansas City, all of Johnson County, and several rural counties to the south and west. The incumbent is Democrat Sharice Davids, who was re-elected with 53.4% of the vote in 2024.

=== Democratic primary ===
==== Candidates ====
===== Nominee =====
- Sharice Davids, incumbent U.S. representative

===== Eliminated in primary =====
- Sarah Preu, technology and communications professional

==== Endorsements ====
Sarah Preu

Organizations

- CAIR Action
- Progressive Democrats of America
- Track AIPAC
Sharice Davids

Labor unions

- American Federation of Government Employees
- Kansas AFL-CIO
- National Education Association

Organizations

- Democratic Majority for Israel
- Giffords
- Human Rights Campaign
- Jewish Democratic Council of America
- Joint Action Committee for Political Affairs
- J Street
- LGBTQ+ Victory Fund
- Planned Parenthood Action Fund

==== Fundraising ====
Campaign finance reports as of March 31, 2026
Candidate	Raised	Spent	Cash on hand
Sharice Davids (D)	$2,937,808	$1,905,382	$1,435,682
Source: Federal Election Commission

==== Results ====
Democratic primary results
Party	Candidate	Votes	%
Democratic	Sharice Davids (incumbent)	73,825	83.4
Democratic	Sarah Preu	14,715	16.6
Total votes		88,540	100.0

=== Republican primary ===
==== Candidates ====
===== Nominee =====
- Eric Jenkins, former Shawnee city councilman

===== Eliminated in primary =====
- Chase LaPorte, businessman and candidate for Governor of Kansas in 2022 (endorsed Steven A. Hohe in general election)

===== Withdrawn =====
- Gavin Solomon, businessman from New York
- Blake Stanley

==== Results ====
Republican primary results
Party	Candidate	Votes	%
Republican	Eric Jenkins	60,866	78.7
Republican	Chase LaPorte	16,507	21.3
Total votes		77,373	100.0

=== Third-party and independent candidates ===
==== Nominee ====
- Steven A. Hohe (Libertarian)

=== General election ===
==== Predictions ====
Source	Ranking	As of
Decision Desk HQ	Safe D	November 3, 2026
The Cook Political Report	Solid D	May 29, 2025
Inside Elections	Solid D	May 29, 2025
Sabato's Crystal Ball	Safe D	July 30, 2026

==== Post-primary endorsements ====
Sharice Davids (D)

Labor unions

- Association of Flight Attendants-CWA

==== Fundraising ====
Campaign finance reports as of October 14, 2026
Candidate	Raised	Spent	Cash on hand
Sharice Davids (D)	$4,656,759	$3,199,989	$1,860,026
Eric Jenkins (D)	$51,735	$32,794	$18,941
Source: Federal Election Commission

==== Results ====
2026 Kansas's 3rd congressional district election
Party	Candidate	Votes	%	±%
Democratic	Sharice Davids (incumbent)	204,626	59.6	+6.2
Republican	Eric Jenkins	131,418	38.3	–4.3
Libertarian	Steven A. Hohe	7,086	2.1	–1.9
Total votes		343,130	100	

== District 4 ==
2026 Kansas's 4th congressional district election
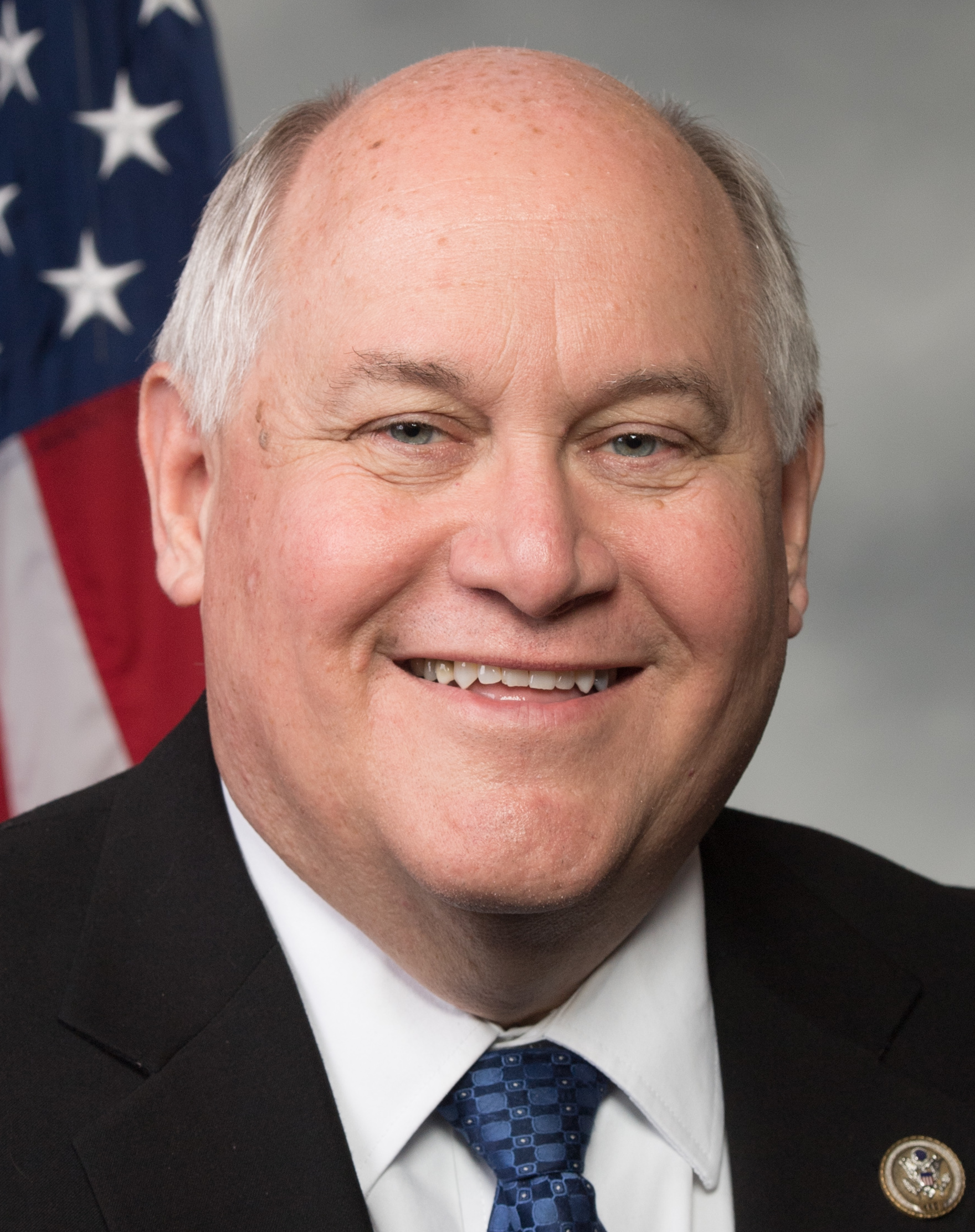

Nominee	Ron Estes	Katy Tyndell
Party	Republican	Democratic
Popular vote	141,285	117,274
Percentage	53.3%	44.3%
- County results Estes: 50–60% 60–70% 70–80% 80–90% Tyndell: 40–50%
U.S. Representative before election
Ron Estes
Republican
Elected U.S. Representative
Ron Estes
Republican

The 4th district encompasses the city of Wichita, the largest city in Kansas, three universities, Arkansas City, and the State of Kansas's only national airport. The incumbent is Republican Ron Estes who was re-elected with 65.0% of the vote in 2024.

=== Republican primary ===
==== Candidates ====
===== Nominee =====
- Ron Estes, incumbent U.S. representative

===== Eliminated in primary =====
- Frank McCollum, farmer

===== Withdrawn =====
- Michael Gaynor, laborer

==== Endorsements ====
Ron Estes

Executive branch officials

- Donald Trump, 45th and 47th president of the United States (2017–2021, 2025–present)

Organizations

- AIPAC
- National Rifle Association Political Victory Fund

==== Fundraising ====
Campaign finance reports as of March 31, 2026
Candidate	Raised	Spent	Cash on hand
Ron Estes (R)	$1,501,743	$1,077,173	$1,622,846
Source: Federal Election Commission

==== Results ====
Republican primary results
Party	Candidate	Votes	%
Republican	Ron Estes (incumbent)	67,464	80.9
Republican	Frank McCollum	15,961	19.1
Total votes		83,425	100.0

=== Democratic primary ===
==== Candidates ====
===== Nominee =====
- Katy Tyndell, attorney

===== Eliminated in primary =====
- Chris Carmichael, retired U.S. Air Force colonel
- Ryan Gilbert, law firm business manager

===== Withdrawn =====
- Cole Epley, foster care social worker (remained on ballot, endorsed Carmichael)
- Jordan Mitchell, activist
- Daniel Schneider, political organizer and Peace Corps veteran

==== Fundraising ====
Campaign finance reports as of March 31, 2026
Candidate	Raised	Spent	Cash on hand
Chris Carmichael (D)	$85,440	$41,992	$43,458
Katy Tyndell (D)	$138,931	$18,520	$120,411
Source: Federal Election Commission

==== Results ====
Democratic primary results
Party	Candidate	Votes	%
Democratic	Katy Tyndell	27,899	66.1
Democratic	Chris Carmichael	9,249	21.9
Democratic	Ryan Gilbert	3,231	7.7
Democratic	Cole Epley (withdrawn)	1,820	4.3
Total votes		42,199	100.0

=== Third-party and independent candidates ===
==== Nominee ====
- Drew Cranmer (Libertarian), data engineer

==== Withdrawn ====
- Paul Catanese (Independent)

==== Fundraising ====
Campaign finance reports as of March 31, 2026
Candidate	Raised	Spent	Cash on hand
Paul Catanese (I)	$3,040	$799	$2,241
Source: Federal Election Commission

=== General election ===
==== Predictions ====
Source	Ranking	As of
Decision Desk HQ	Safe R	July 14, 2026
The Cook Political Report	Solid R	May 29, 2025
Inside Elections	Solid R	May 29, 2025
Sabato's Crystal Ball	Safe R	May 29, 2025

==== Post-primary endorsements ====
Katy Tyndell (D)

Labor unions

- National Education Association

==== Fundraising ====
Campaign finance reports as of July 15, 2026
Candidate	Raised	Spent	Cash on hand
Ron Estes (R)	$1,855,035	$1,295,634	$1,757,677
Katy Tyndell (D)	$234,455	$161,558	$72,869
Source: Federal Election Commission

==== Results ====
2026 Kansas's 4th congressional district election
Party	Candidate	Votes	%	±%
Republican	Ron Estes (incumbent)	141,285	53.3	–11.7
Democratic	Katy Tyndell	117,274	44.3	+9.3
Libertarian	Drew Cranmer	6,347	2.4	N/A
Total votes		264,906	100	

== See also ==
- 2026 Kansas elections
- 2026 United States House of Representatives elections
- 2026 Kansas House of Representatives election
