= Benjamin Hodge (Kansas politician) =

American politician

Member of the Kansas House of Representatives from the 49th district
- In office January 2007 – May 2008
- Preceded by: Scott Schwab
- Succeeded by: Scott Schwab

Personal details
- Born: March 20, 1980 (age 46) Kansas City, Missouri
- Party: Republican

Benjamin B. Hodge (born March 20, 1980) is a Republican former American politician.

== Political Career ==
=== State Representative ===
Hodge served in the Kansas House of Representatives for less than one term. He was elected to District 49 of the Kansas House (representing Overland Park) in 2006, ascending to the seat in relatively close victories in both the primary (53%, vs. 47% for fellow Republican Bobby Love) and the general election (55%, vs. 45% for Democrat Bond Faulwell). Hodge resigned his state house seat less than 18 months into his term and was replaced by Scott Schwab on May 27, 2008.
