= Amanda Adkins (politician) =

American politician

65th Chair of the Kansas Republican Party
- In office January 31, 2009 – January 26, 2013
- Preceded by: Kris Kobach
- Succeeded by: Kelly Arnold

Personal details
- Born: Amanda Landes; 1974 or 1975 (age 50–51)
- Party: Republican
- Spouse: Jason Adkins
- Children: 2
- Education: University of Kansas (BS)

Amanda Adkins (née Landes; born 1974/1975) is an American politician and businesswoman who was the chairwoman of the Kansas Republican Party from 2009 to 2013. She was the Republican nominee for Kansas's 3rd congressional district in both the 2020 election and 2022 election, losing both times to Democratic incumbent Sharice Davids.

== Education ==
Amanda Landes, daughter of Bob and Leta (née Blessing) Landes, earned a Bachelor of Science degree in human biology and anthropology from the University of Kansas in 1998.

== Career ==
After graduating from the University of Kansas, Adkins was a legislative aide in the United States Senate for two years and a staffer on the United States House Committee on Rules. She later worked as the legislative director for Congressman David Dreier. She then worked as the director of GOPAC, a Republican political action committee and 527 training organization.

Adkins worked for the healthcare IT firm Cerner for 15 years. She took a leave of absence from her role as vice president for strategic growth in order to run for the U.S. House in 2020. In January 2021, she left the company permanently.

== Elections ==
=== 2020 U.S. House campaign ===
In the 2020 election, Adkins was a candidate for Kansas's 3rd congressional district. She won the Republican primary election against four other candidates but was defeated by the incumbent Democrat, Sharice Davids, in the November general election.

=== 2022 U.S. House campaign ===
In April 2021, Adkins announced that she would again run as a Republican candidate for the district in the 2022 election. She won the Republican primary election against John McCaughrean and lost to incumbent Democrat Davids on a rematch in the November general election.

== Personal life ==
Adkins and her husband, Jason, have two children, Madison and Dylan Adkins. They live in Overland Park, Kansas.

Party political offices
Preceded by Kris Kobach	Chairperson of the Kansas Republican Party; 2009–2013	Succeeded by Kelly Arnold
