= Maur Hill–Mount Academy =

Catholic boarding school in Kansas, U.S.

Location
- 1000 Green Street; Atchison, Atchison County, Kansas 66002; United States; 39°32′44.4″N 95°7′37″W

Information
- Type: Private, day, boarding school
- Motto: Ora Et Labora (Pray and work)
- Religious affiliations: Roman Catholic, Benedictine
- Established: 1863 (Mount); 1919 (Maur Hill)
- President: John Dahlstrand
- Principal: Kenneth Rolling
- Chaplain: Fr. Jeremy Heppler (St. Benedict's Abbey)
- Grades: 9–12
- Gender: Coeducational
- Average class size: 15
- Student to teacher ratio: 9:1
- Campus size: 90 acres
- Colors: Black and Gold
- Athletics conference: Northeast Kansas League
- Mascot: Raven
- Accreditation: Cognia
- Tuition: $32,500 (U.S. Boarder); $44,350 (International)
- Website: www.mh-ma.com

Maur Hill–Mount Academy is a coed Catholic, college prep, boarding high school in Atchison, Kansas. It is located in the Roman Catholic Archdiocese of Kansas City in Kansas and sponsored by the St. Benedict's Abbey (monastery) and Mount St. Scholastica (convent) in Atchison, KS. It became Maur Hill–Mount Academy with the merger of the two long established schools: Maur Hill Prep School (1919) was an all-boys school and Mount St. Scholastica Academy (1863), an all-girls school.

The student population is around 190–220 students, about 80–90 boarding and 100–120 day students from the surrounding area.

== Academics ==
Regular high school courses, honors courses, college courses and AP courses are all available. Upper-level students also are able to take college courses at Benedictine College.

== Accreditation and association memberships ==
It is accredited by Cognia and maintains memberships or association in the Secondary School Admission Test Board, Catholic Boarding School Association, Small Boarding School Association, the Cardinal Newman Society, and the National Catholic Education Association.

Although an independent school with primary sponsorship from St. Benedict's Abbey and the Mount St. Scholastica Monastery, it is recognized and maintains connection with Roman Catholic Archdiocese of Kansas City in Kansas.

The school competes athletically and academically as a member of the nine-school Northeast Kansas League.

== Notable alumni ==
- Mike Haverty (Maur Hill Prep School, 1962) – former president and CEO of Kansas City Southern Railway
- Mike Kuckelman (Maur Hill Prep School) – Chairman of the Kansas Republican Party
- Deran Sarafian (Maur Hill Prep School, 1975) – television producer and director, involved in CSI, House, and Lost
