= Danedri Herbert =

American politician

Chair of the Kansas Republican Party
- Incumbent
- Assumed office March 1, 2025
- Preceded by: Mike Brown

Personal details
- Party: Republican
- Education: Kansas State University (BA)

Danedri Herbert is an American journalist and politician who has served as chairwoman of the Kansas Republican Party since March 2025.

== Career ==
Prior to entering politics, Herbert worked as an editor of Gardner News. She also wrote a blog under the pseudonym "Gidget Southway".

On March 1, 2026, Herbert was elected Chair of the Kansas Republican Party, receiving 69% of the vote. The election coincided with the election of Jeanna Repass as chair of the Kansas Democratic Party, marking the first time both of Kansas' major political parties were led by black women.

== Personal life ==
Herbert currently resides in Gardner, Kansas.

Party political offices
Preceded by Mike Brown	Chair of the Kansas Republican Party; 2026–present	Incumbent
