= 2022 Kansas elections =

- November 8, 2022

Kansas state elections were held in the state of Kansas on November 8, 2022. Primary elections were held on August 2, 2022.

Voters elected all six executive officers, the lower house of the state legislature, and all of the state's delegations to the U.S. House.

== United States Congress ==
=== Senate ===
2022 United States Senate election in Kansas
Party	Candidate	Votes	%	±%
Republican	Jerry Moran (incumbent)	602,976	60.00%	−2.18%
Democratic	Mark Holland	372,214	37.04%	+4.80%
Libertarian	David Graham	29,766	2.96%	−2.62%
Total votes		1,004,956	100.0%	
Republican hold				

=== House of Representatives ===
Kansas elected four U.S. representatives, one for each congressional district.

District	Republican		Democratic		Others		Total		Result
District	Votes	%	Votes	%	Votes	%	Votes	%	Result
District 1	161,333	67.67%	77,092	32.33%	0	0.00%	238,425	100.0%	Republican hold
District 2	134,506	57.64%	98,852	42.36%	0	0.00%	233,358	100.0%	Republican hold
District 3	128,839	42.76%	165,527	54.94%	6,928	2.30%	301,294	100.0%	Democratic hold
District 4	144,889	63.34%	83,851	36.66%	0	0.00%	228,740	100.0%	Republican hold
Total	569,567	56.85%	425,322	42.46%	6,928	0.69%	1,001,817	100.0%	

Popular vote
Republican	56.85%
Democratic	42.46%
Other	0.69%

House seats
Republican	75.00%
Democratic	25.00%

== Governor and Lieutenant Governor ==
2022 Kansas gubernatorial election
Party	Candidate	Votes	%	±%
Democratic	Laura Kelly (incumbent); David Toland (incumbent)	499,849	49.54%	+1.53%
Republican	Derek Schmidt; Katie Sawyer	477,591	47.33%	+4.35%
Independent	Dennis Pyle; Kathleen Garrison	20,452	2.03%	N/A
Libertarian	Seth Cordell; Evan Laudick-Gains	11,106	1.10%	−0.80%
Total votes		1,008,998	100.0%	
Turnout			47.94%	
Democratic hold				

== Secretary of state ==
2022 Kansas Secretary of State election
Party	Candidate	Votes	%	±%
Republican	Scott Schwab (incumbent)	580,908	58.36%	▲5.76
Democratic	Jeanna Repass	386,661	38.84%	▼5.03
Libertarian	Cullene Lang	27,844	2.80%	▼0.73
Total votes		995,413	100%	
Republican hold				

== Attorney general ==
2022 Kansas Attorney General election
Party	Candidate	Votes	%	±%
Republican	Kris Kobach	506,817	50.80	▼8.18
Democratic	Chris Mann	490,925	49.20	▲8.18
Total votes		997,742	100.00	
Republican hold				

== Treasurer ==
2022 Kansas State Treasurer election
Party	Candidate	Votes	%
Republican	Steven Johnson	537,488	54.03
Democratic	Lynn Rogers (incumbent)	411,813	41.39
Libertarian	Steve Roberts	45,540	4.58
Total votes		994,841	100.00
Republican gain from Democratic			

== Insurance Commissioner ==
Incumbent Republican Vicki Schmidt won re-election. This was the only Kansas statewide election where Johnson County voted for the Republican nominee.

2022 Kansas Insurance Commissioner election
Party	Candidate	Votes	%
Republican	Vicki Schmidt (incumbent)	618,108	63.01%
Democratic	Kiel Corkran	362,882	36.99%
Total votes		980,990	100.00%
Republican hold			

== State Board of Education ==
All Kansas State Board of Education Republicans won.

2022 Kansas State Board of Education 1
Party	Candidate	Votes	%
Republican	Danny Zeck	59,425	61.36%
Democratic	Jeffery M. Howards	37,417	38.64%
Total votes		96,842	100.00%
Republican hold			

2022 Kansas State Board of Education 2
Party	Candidate	Votes	%
Republican	Michelle Dombrosky (incumbent)	61,757	52.40%
Democratic	Sheila Albers	56,101	47.60%
Total votes		117,858	100.00%
Republican hold			

2022 Kansas State Board of Education 5
Party	Candidate	Votes	%
Republican	Cathy Hopkins	74,080	100.00%
Total votes		74,080	100.00%
Republican hold			

2022 Kansas State Board of Education 7
Party	Candidate	Votes	%
Republican	Dennis Hershberger	83,029	100.00%
Total votes		83,029	100.00%
Republican hold			

2022 Kansas State Board of Education 9
Party	Candidate	Votes	%
Republican	Jim Porter (incumbent)	85,015	100.00%
Total votes		85,015	100.00%
Republican hold			

== State House of Representatives ==
The Kansas House of Representatives held elections for all 125 seats in 2022. Republicans maintained their supermajority in the chamber.

-
Party	Votes	%	Seats	+/–	%
Republican Party	566,412	62.57%	85	-1	68%
Democratic Party	334,211	36.92%	40	+1	32%
Libertarian Party	4,584	0.50%	0	–	0%
Total	905,207	100%	125	–	

== Abortion referendum ==
Value Them Both Amendment
Choice	Votes	%
For	385,014	40.84
Against	557,837	59.16
Total	942,851	100.00
Registered voters/turnout	1,929,972	48.85
Source: Secretary of State of Kansas
