= Mike Brown (Kansas politician) =

American Politician (Kansas)

Chair of the Kansas Republican Party
- In office February 11, 2023 – March 1, 2025
- Preceded by: Mike Kuckelman
- Succeeded by: Danedri Herbert

Personal details
- Born: Kansas City, Kansas, U.S.
- Party: Republican
- Spouse: Kristi Brown
- Children: 5
- Education: Johnson County Community College (attended); Kansas State University (attended)
- Website: Campaign website

Mike Brown is an American politician from Kansas who serves as Senior Director to the United States Treasurer in the U.S Department of the Treasury. Brown joined the Trump Administration in late October, 2025. Brown served from 2023-2025 as the Chairman of the Kansas Republican Party. In 2022, Brown challenged incumbent Scott Schwab in that year's Kansas Secretary of State election. Brown served as a Johnson County Kansas Commissioner from 2017-2021.

== Early life ==
Brown, a 6th generation Kansan, was born and raised in the Kansas City metro area. He graduated from Shawnee Mission Northwest High School as part of the class of 1987, and attended Johnson County Community College and Kansas State University. Brown worked in the construction industry since high school, opening his own home building company in 1990 and working as a land developer, homebuilder and general contractor.

== Political career ==
=== Early career ===
Brown started his political career volunteering for Republican Tim Shallenburger in the 2002 bid for governor and two local county commissioner campaigns in 2004 and 2008. In 2016, Mike was elected as a Johnson County (KS) Commissioner. He served in this office until 2021. He has also served in a series of other Kansas and county roles including Johnson County's Parks and Recreation Commissioner, Vice Chairman of the Kansas State Workforce Development Board, board member of the Kansas Black Chamber of Commerce, and the 2007 President (and a 12 year board member) of the Homebuilders’ Association of Greater Kansas City.

=== Secretary of State bid ===
In the 2022 Kansas Secretary of State election, Brown challenged incumbent Secretary of State of Kansas, Scott Schwab, claiming that Schwab was a part of the Republican establishment. Brown’s campaign was based on “Election Integrity First” and he lost with 44.76% to Schwab's 55.24%.

=== KSGOP Party Chairman ===
Mike Brown was elected Kansas GOP Party Chairman in 2022 against Helen Van Etten, a long-time Kansas GOP leader. During his tenure, Brown has worked to remove minority and womens group leaders from the state and executive committees. Supermajorities in the Kansas Senate and House were increased under Brown’s leadership. On March 11, 2024, an event was held in Brown's home county where attendees paid money to beat an effigy of Joe Biden. This renewed calls for him to be removed as party chairman.

During the 2024 Presidential campaign, Brown served as a Bundler for the Donald J. Trump for President campaign. He utilized his contacts across the state to raise considerable money for the presidents re-election.

On February 15, 2025, Brown announced that he would not be seeking re-election to another term as chairman. Brown stated that he did so because he had achieved his mission, the re-election of Donald Trump and needed to refocus his time on the care of his mother who recently had a stroke.

== Personal life ==
Brown is married to Kristi Brown who served as the Kansas State Director of the Trump 2024 campaign. The couple live in Overland Park, Kansas and Washington, DC. Together they have 5 grown children.

== Electoral history ==
2022 Kansas Secretary of State Republican primary results
Party	Candidate	Votes	%
Republican	Scott Schwab (incumbent)	245,998	55.24%
Republican	Mike Brown	199,316	44.76%
Total votes		445,314	100%

Kansas Republican Party Chairman
Party	Candidate	Votes	%
Republican	Mike Brown	90	50.56%
Republican	Helen Van Etten	88	49.16%
Total votes		178	100%

Party political offices
Preceded by Mike Kuckelman	Chair of the Kansas Republican Party; 2023–2025	Succeeded by Danedri Herbert
