= Sharice Davids =

American politician and attorney (born 1980)

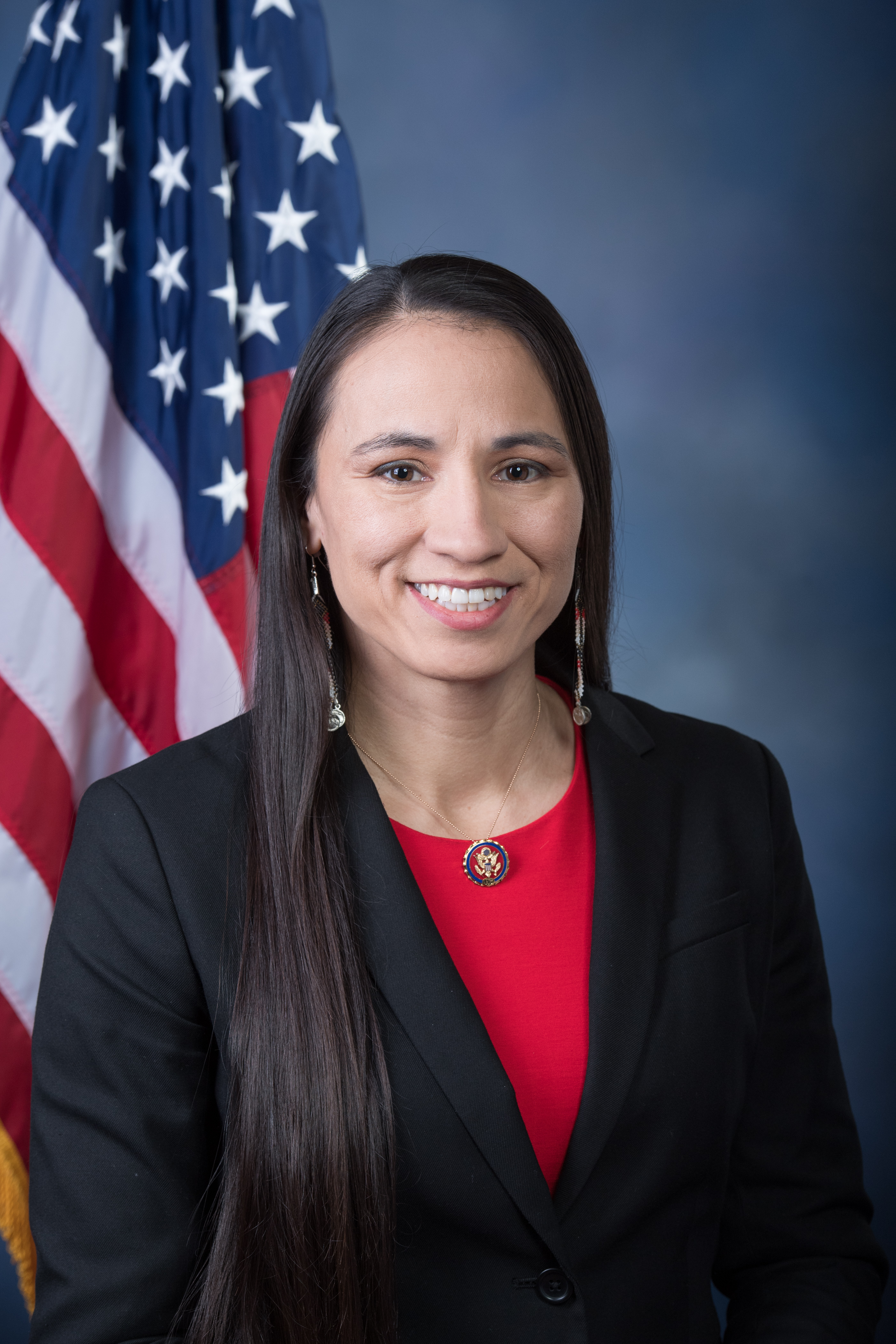
- Official portrait, 2019

Member of the U.S. House of Representatives from Kansas's 3rd district
- Incumbent
- Assumed office January 3, 2019
- Preceded by: Kevin Yoder

Personal details
- Born: Sharice Lynnette Davids; May 22, 1980 (age 46) Frankfurt, West Germany (now Germany)
- Citizenship: American; Ho-Chunk
- Party: Democratic
- Education: Haskell Indian Nations University (attended); University of Kansas (attended); Johnson County Community College (AA); University of Missouri, Kansas City (BBA); Cornell University (JD)
- Website: House website Campaign website
- Sharice Davids's voice Sharice Davids supporting the INVEST Act. Recorded June 30, 2021

Sharice Lynnette Davids (/ʃəˈris/; born May 22, 1980) is an American politician, attorney, and former mixed martial artist serving as the U.S. representative from Kansas's 3rd congressional district since 2019. A member of the Democratic Party, she represents a district that includes most of the Kansas side of the Kansas City metropolitan area, including Kansas City, Overland Park, Prairie Village, Leawood, Lenexa, and Olathe.

Davids was elected in 2018 and became the first Democrat to represent a Kansas congressional district in a decade. She is the first openly LGBT Native American elected to the United States Congress, the first openly LGBT person elected to the United States Congress from Kansas, and one of the first two Native American women (alongside Deb Haaland) elected to the United States Congress. She is also the second Native American to represent Kansas in Congress, after Charles Curtis, who represented Kansas in the U.S. House and Senate between 1893 and 1929. Davids and Senator-Elect Adam Hamilton will be the only Democrats in Kansas' Republican-dominated congressional delegation.

An attorney educated at the University of Missouri–Kansas City and Cornell Law School, Davids was also a professional mixed martial artist in the 2010s.

== Early life and education ==
Davids was born on May 22, 1980, in Frankfurt, West Germany. She is a member of the Ho-Chunk people, and an enrolled member of the Ho-Chunk Nation of Wisconsin.

Her maternal grandfather, Fredrick J. Davids, a United States Army veteran, was born into the Mohican Nation Stockbridge-Munsee Band, in Oneida, Wisconsin. Sharice was raised by her single mother, Crystal Herriage, who served in the U.S. Army.

Davids attended Leavenworth High School, Haskell Indian Nations University, Johnson County Community College, the University of Kansas, and the University of Missouri–Kansas City, graduating from the latter with a bachelor's degree in business administration in 2007. She earned her Juris Doctor from Cornell Law School in 2010. She lives in Roeland Park, Kansas, and was endorsed for reelection by The Kansas City Star in 2022.

== Mixed martial arts career ==
Davids began competing in mixed martial arts (MMA) as an amateur in 2006, and went professional in 2013. She had a 5–1 win–loss record as an amateur and a 1–1 record as a professional. She tried out for The Ultimate Fighter but did not make it onto the show, leading her to shift her focus away from MMA to travel the U.S. and live on Native American reservations to work with the communities on economic and community development programs.

=== Record ===
Professional

Res.	Record	Opponent	Method	Event	Date	Round	Time	Location	Notes
Loss	1–1	Rosa Acevedo	Decision (unanimous)	LCS 18	March 1, 2014	3	5:00	Torrington, Wyoming, United States	
Win	1–0	Nadia Nixon	Submission (triangle choke)	Shamrock FC – Conquest	November 1, 2013	1	2:08	Kansas City, Missouri, United States	

Amateur

Res.	Record	Opponent	Method	Event	Date	Round	Time	Location	Notes
Win	5–1	Heather Rafferty	Decision (unanimous)	Pride & Pain MMA	October 20, 2012	3	3:00	Hot Springs, South Dakota, United States	
Win	4–1	Chandra Engel	Submission (triangle choke)	Ultimate Blue Corner Battles	January 27, 2012	1	2:36	North Kansas City, Missouri, United States	
Win	3–1	Ronni Nanney	TKO (knee & punch)	Ultimate Blue Corner Battles	April 1, 2011	3	3:00	North Kansas City, Missouri, United States	
Win	2–1	Stacia Hoss	TKO (knee & punch)	Ultimate Blue Corner Battles	August 27, 2010	1	0:27	North Kansas City, Missouri, United States	
Loss	1–1	Erin Roper	Submission (armbar)	Shamrock FC: Midwest Fightfest	May 11, 2007	1	1:53	Kansas City, Missouri, United States	
Win	1–0	Courtney Martel	Technical Submission (triangle choke)	ISFC Midwest Fightfest	October 27, 2006	1	0:44	Kansas City, Missouri, United States	

== Legal career ==
Davids began her legal career at SNR Denton in 2010. She later directed community and economic development for the Pine Ridge Indian Reservation.

In 2016, Davids worked as a White House fellow in the Department of Transportation during the transition between the Obama and Trump administrations.

== U.S. House of Representatives ==
=== Elections ===
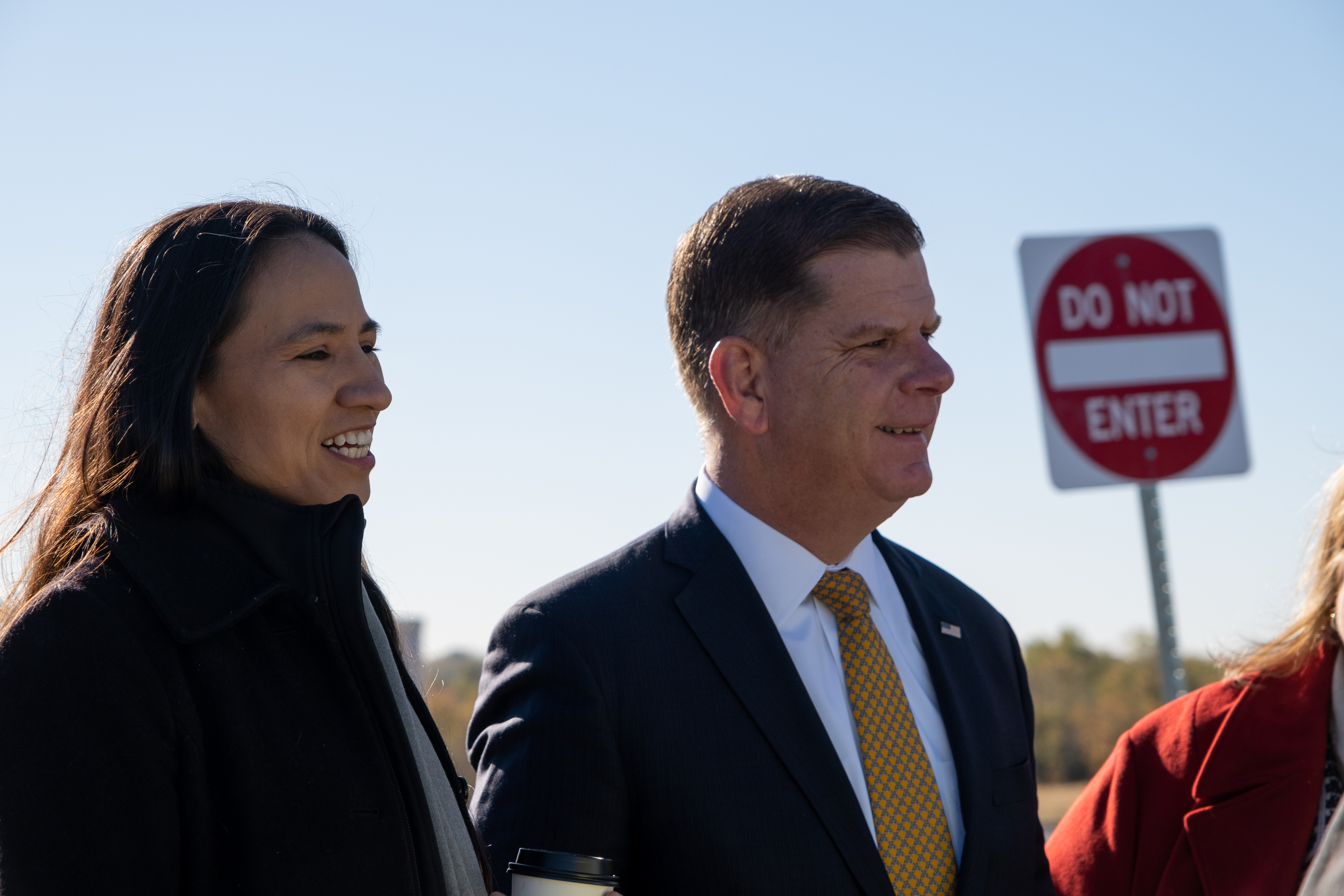
Davids with U.S. Labor Secretary Marty Walsh in 2022

==== 2018 ====
In 2018, Davids ran for the U.S. House of Representatives in Kansas's 3rd congressional district. In the August Democratic primary election, she defeated Brent Welder, who had been endorsed by Bernie Sanders, 37% to 34%.

During a July 2018 episode of the Millennial Politics Podcast, host Jordan Valerie Allen asked Davids whether she supported abolishing ICE, the agency that enforces immigration laws and falls within the oversight of the Department of Homeland Security, to which Davids responded, "you asked me about defunding, which I think is probably essentially the same thing. But yeah." Despite denials by Davids through campaign statements and a television advertisement, the Associated Press fact checker ruled that she did in fact lend her support to ending the agency.

In October, Kansas City NPR member station KCUR fact-checked the claims that incumbent representative Kevin Yoder and Davids made in separate interviews on its station and gave Yoder an "F". Yoder said that immigrants were making false asylum claims and would increase crime. Davids said that she supported single-payer health care, but it could not be enacted with Republicans in the White House. Meanwhile, she supports short-term goals like allowing Medicare to negotiate drug prices and getting generics to market faster. KCUR said that Davids's claim that teachers are not paid enough and can no longer take tax deductions for buying their own school supplies, was "partly true and partly false" since the tax deduction had been reinstated.

Davids defeated Yoder in the November 8 general election by 53.6% to 43.9%. Upon her swearing-in on January 3, 2019, she became the first Democrat to represent Kansas in the House since Dennis Moore left office in 2011. She is also only the second Democrat to represent what is now the 3rd since 1963.

In 2019, Davids and Deb Haaland of New Mexico, a member of the Laguna Pueblo tribe, became the first Native American women to serve in Congress. In March 2021, Haaland left Congress to become the secretary of interior in the Biden administration.

==== 2020 ====
In 2020, Davids was unopposed in the Democratic primary, winning 74,437 votes.

Davids faced the Republican nominee, Cerner Corporation executive and former Kansas Republican Party chairwoman Amanda Adkins, in the general election. Davids was endorsed by the Kansas City Star.

Davids defeated Adkins with 53.6% of the vote to Adkins's 43.6%.

==== 2022 ====
In 2022, Davids ran for reelection in the newly redrawn 3rd district. Redistricting shifted the district's boundaries westward, losing parts of Kansas City and adding more ex-urban and rural territory, which made the seat slightly more Republican-leaning. Despite these changes, Davids defeated Republican Amanda Adkins for the second time, winning 54.9% of the vote to Adkins's 42.8% and 2.3% for Libertarian candidate Steve Hohe. This represented a 2.1% improvement over her 2020 margin.

==== 2024 ====
In 2024, Davids won reelection to a fourth term by defeating Republican Prasanth Reddy by a margin of 53.4 to 42.6%.

=== Tenure ===
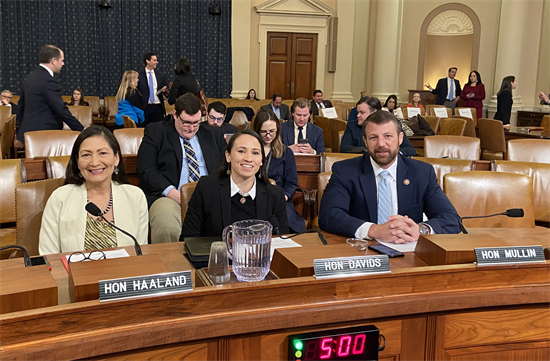
Davids before a committee meeting with Representatives Deb Haaland (D-New Mexico) (right) and Markwayne Mullin (R-Oklahoma) (left)

On December 18, 2019, Davids voted to impeach President Donald Trump and was the only person representing Kansas to do so. In March 2020, Davids quarantined herself for possible exposure to coronavirus. Before that, she had mostly switched her congressional office from physical to digital.

Davids was named a vice-chair of the 2020 Democratic National Convention.

Davids voted with President Joe Biden's stated position 100% of the time in the 117th Congress, according to a FiveThirtyEight analysis. This results in a Biden Plus/Minus score of +10, indicating more support for Biden's priorities than would be expected given the makeup of her district.

Davids voted for the America COMPETES Act of 2022, which passed on a party-line vote. The bill authorized billions of dollars of government spending on American manufacturing and scientific research in an effort to compete with China. Davids added an amendment to the legislation that would include small and medium-sized manufacturers in a $500 million pilot program for producing personal protective equipment and medical supplies.

=== Committee assignments ===
119th Congress:

- Committee on Transportation and Infrastructure
  - United States House Transportation Subcommittee on Aviation
  - United States House Transportation Subcommittee on Highways and Transit
- Committee on Agriculture
  - United States House Agriculture Subcommittee on General Farm Commodities, Risk Management, and Credit (Ranking Member)
  - United States House Agriculture Subcommittee on Conservation, Research, and Biotechnology

=== Leadership ===
- Chief Deputy Whip

=== Caucus memberships ===
- Black Maternal Health Caucus
- Congressional LGBT Equality Caucus (Co-chair)
- Congressional Native American Caucus (Vice Chair)
- Congressional Solar Caucus
- New Democrat Coalition (Vice Chair for 118th Congress)
- House Pro-Choice Caucus
- Congressional Coalition on Adoption
- Congressional Wildlife Refuge Caucus
- Rare Disease Caucus

== Political positions ==
Davids is a member of the center to center-left New Democrat Coalition and has been described as a moderate Democrat.

=== Israel ===
Davids has voted in favor of sending military and defense aid to Israel. She has also voted to block proposed cuts to military and defense aid to Israel.

=== LGBTQ+ rights ===
In September 2025, Davids co-sponsored the 988 LGBTQ+ Youth Access Act of 2025, a House bill seeking to restore funding to the 988 Suicide and Crisis Lifeline, specifically for LGBTQ+ services. The House bill was introduced by House member Raja Krishnamoorthi, and co-sponsored by representatives Mike Lawler, Brian Fitzpatrick, and Seth Moulton, with companion legislation introduced in the Senate by Senators Tammy Baldwin and Lisa Murkowski. It was supported by the Trevor Project, the American Foundation for Suicide Prevention, the National Alliance on Mental Illness, GLSEN, and the Human Rights Campaign.

== Recognition ==
In 2019, Representative Cheri Bustos, then chair of the Democratic Congressional Campaign Committee, took note of Davids, "rating her toward the top of the freshman class in terms of doing things the right way."

In June 2019, to mark the 50th anniversary of the Stonewall riots, an event widely considered a watershed moment in the modern LGBTQ rights movement, Queerty named Davids, who is a lesbian, one of the Pride50 "trailblazing individuals who actively ensure society remains moving towards equality, acceptance and dignity for all queer people". She was also named to the 2021 Fast Company Queer 50 list.

In 2026, she was a recipient of the Torchbearer "Carrying Change" Awards' Illuminator Award.

== Electoral history ==
US House election, 2018: Kansas District 3
Primary election
Party	Candidate	Votes	%
Democratic	Sharice Davids	23,379	37.34
Democratic	Brent Welder	21,190	33.85
Democratic	Tom Niermann	8,939	14.28
Democratic	Mike McCamon	4,354	6.95
Democratic	Sylvia Williams	2,955	4.72
Democratic	Jay Sidie	1,790	2.86
Total votes		62,607	100
General election
Democratic	Sharice Davids	170,518	53.57
Republican	Kevin Yoder (incumbent)	139,762	43.91
Libertarian	Chris Clemmons	8,021	2.52
Total votes		318,301	100
Democratic gain from Republican			

US House election, 2020: Kansas District 3
Party	Candidate	Votes	%
Democratic	Sharice Davids (incumbent)	220,049	53.62
Republican	Amanda Adkins	178,773	43.56
Libertarian	Steven Hohe	11,596	2.83
Total votes		410,418	100
Democratic hold			

US House election, 2022: Kansas District 3
Party	Candidate	Votes	%
Democratic	Sharice Davids (incumbent)	165,527	54.94
Republican	Amanda Adkins	128,839	42.76
Libertarian	Steven Hohe	6,928	2.30
Total votes		301,294	100
Democratic hold			

US House election, 2024: Kansas District 3
Party	Candidate	Votes	%
Democratic	Sharice Davids (incumbent)	209,871	53.36
Republican	Prasanth Reddy	167,570	42.60
Libertarian	Steve Roberts	15,892	4.04
Total votes		393,333	100
Democratic hold			

US House election, 2026: Kansas District 3
Primary election
Party	Candidate	Votes	%
Democratic	Sharice Davids (incumbent)	73,825	83.38
Democratic	Sarah Preu	14,715	16.62
Total votes		88,540	100

== See also ==
- Kansas's congressional delegations
- List of American sportsperson-politicians
- List of female mixed martial artists
- List of LGBT members of the United States Congress
- List of Native Americans in the United States Congress
- Native American women in politics
- Women in the United States House of Representatives

U.S. House of Representatives
Preceded by Kevin Yoder	Member of the U.S. House of Representatives from Kansas's 3rd congressional district 2019–present	Incumbent
U.S. order of precedence (ceremonial)
Preceded by Jason Crow	United States representatives by seniority 196th	Succeeded by Madeleine Dean
