= Johnson County Post =

American online news magazine

Coordinates: 39°00′N 94°42′W

- Type: Local journalism
- Format: Online
- Owner(s): Jay Senter; Julia Westhoff
- Founder(s): Julia Westhoff; Jay Senter
- Publisher: Post Publishing Inc.
- Editor: Kyle Palmer
- Deputy editor: Leah Wankum
- Staff writers: Juliana Garcia; Andrew Gaug; Lucie Krisman; Kaylie McLaughlin
- Founded: October 2010; 15 years ago
- Political alignment: Nonpartisanism
- Language: English
- City: Prairie Village, KS
- Country: United States
- Circulation: 2,700 (as of 2019)
- Website: johnsoncountypost.com
- Free online archives: No

Logo of the Shawnee Mission Post prior to merger

The Johnson County Post is a United States nonpartisan subscription-based online newspaper founded in 2010. It is updated daily, Mondays through Fridays.

== History ==
=== Shawnee Mission Post ===
Upon their return in 2010 from volunteer Peace Corps postings in Panama, Jay Senter and Julia Westhoff, a couple who had worked together on their college newspaper found that media coverage of their home in northern Johnson County, Kansas, lacked coverage of government and school news. In response, they started a news website At first, they called their publication, the Prairie Village Post. As they broadened their extent of their coverage, they adopted the name, Shawnee Mission Post.

The intent of the publishers was to focus on local news, most particularly in Northern Johnson County, Kansas. To that end, they covered municipal affairs in the sixteen towns within the Postal-designated area Shawnee Mission, as well as school district meetings and news. They have also covered state legislators and federal representatives from the 3rd Congressional district and the U.S. Senate.

Dan Blom, a former newspaper editor, joined the organization in 2012. By 2014, 35,000 unique visitors per month were logging on.

By 2019, the site had 2,700 subscribers paying up to $72 annually.

"Shawnee Mission" is not the name of a municipality, but rather refers to a postal area designation that incorporates all or parts of 16 cities and towns with Zip Codes in North and Northeast Johnson County Kansas. It borders southwest Kansas City, Kansas The towns include Leawood, Lenexa, Mission, Mission Hills, Overland Park (partial), Prairie Village, Roeland Park, Shawnee, and Westwood. If those towns were a single municipality, they would constitute the second largest city in Kansas, with a population of over 400,000.

The Shawnee Mission Post has part of their site covered by a paywall, noting that the people who pay want "More civics. Fewer restaurants." This may not work for other news outlets, but it seems to be working for the Shawnee Mission Post.

The Shawnee Mission Post is a member of both the Kansas Press Association and Local Independent Online News Publishers (LION).

=== Blue Valley Post ===
In 2021 a sister publication, the Blue Valley Post, was launched to focus on issues on the Blue Valley region of east central and southeast Johnson County centered around Overland Park and parts of Leawood and Stilwell. The two newspapers shared the same staff and ownership under Post Publishing Inc.

=== Johnson County Post ===
In January 2024, the Shawnee Mission Post and the Blue Valley Post merged to become the Johnson County Post.
