= Shawnee, Kansas =

- City
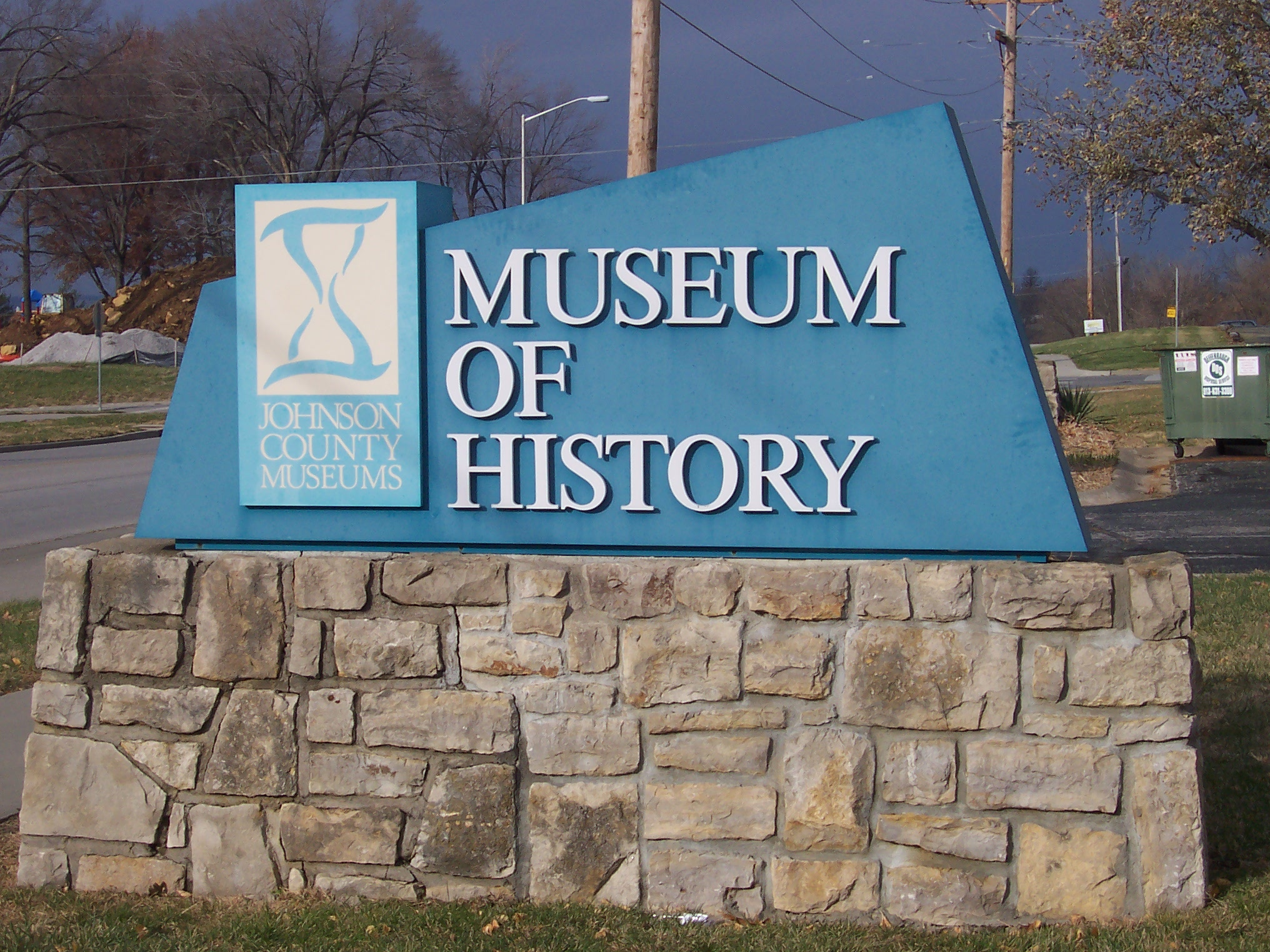
- Johnson County Museum of History (2005)

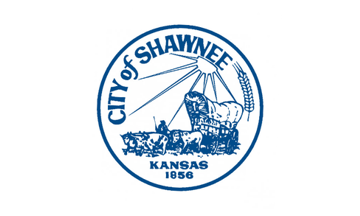
- Flag Seal

- Location within Johnson County and Kansas
- Interactive map of Shawnee, Kansas
- Coordinates: 39°00′57″N 94°48′27″W
- Country: United States
- State: Kansas
- County: Johnson

Government
  - Mayor: Mickey Sandifer

Area
  - Total: 42.86 sq mi (111.01 km^{2})
  - Land: 41.98 sq mi (108.72 km^{2})
  - Water: 0.89 sq mi (2.30 km^{2})
- Elevation: 820 ft (250 m)

Population (2020)
  - Total: 67,311
  - Estimate (2022): 69,198
  - Density: 1,603.5/sq mi (619.12/km^{2})
- Time zone: UTC-6 (CST)
  - Summer (DST): UTC-5 (CDT)
- ZIP Codes: 66203, 66214, 66216-20, 66226-27, 66299
- Area code: 913
- FIPS code: 20-64500
- GNIS ID: 485652
- Website: cityofshawnee.org

Shawnee /ʃɑːˈniː/ shaw-NEE is a city in Johnson County, Kansas, United States. It is the seventh-most populous municipality in the Kansas City metropolitan area. As of the 2020 census, the population of the city was 67,311.

== History ==
=== Territory of Kansas ===
Before and after the Civil War, Shawnee served as a government road that connected Fort Leavenworth to Fort Riley. During the mid 19th century, branches of the Oregon Trail and nearby Santa Fe Trail that passed through Olathe, Overland Park and Kansas City, Missouri saw settlers travel through the area. A Shawnee Indian mission had been established at the present site of Shawnee in 1831. Shawnee was laid out as a town in 1857. Kansas entered the union as a free state on January 29, 1861, to become the 34th state. The declaration of a free state added to the tension between the anti-slave abolitionists and pro-slave Confederate guerrillas.

=== American Civil War ===
In October 1862, Willam Quantrill ordered an attack on Shawnee, which saw the town pillaged and burned to the ground. Quantrill and his army of bushwhackers return in the summer of 1863, to raid and look for an escape route from Lawrence, which he was intending to sack. The raids on Shawnee served as a training exercise before attempting the full scale siege on Lawrence.

Shawnee was selected by Quantrill for its proximity to Lawrence, being 35 miles away (56 km). Lawrence was established for the political reason of being an anti-slave town and had many clashes with the confederate army started before the American Civil War. The first documented event of Bleeding Kansas was the Wakarusa War that saw both sides clash and come to a temporary truce. This allowed Lawrence to add to its defenses before the Sacking of Lawrence. In August 1863, the Lawrence Massacre took place at the hands of William Quantrill. This resulted in 250 men corralled and murdered and $2.2 million in damages.

== Geography ==
According to the United States Census Bureau, the city has a total area of 42.86 square miles (111.01 km^{2}), of which 41.85 square miles (108.39 km^{2}) is land and 1.01 square miles (2.62 km^{2}) is water.

Shawnee Mission Park is a 1,600-acre (6.5 km^{2}) park that includes a 120-acre (0.49 km^{2}) lake.

== Demographics ==
Historical population
Census	Pop.	Note	%±
1930	553		—
1940	597		8.0%
1950	845		41.5%
1960	9,072		973.6%
1970	20,946		130.9%
1980	29,653		41.6%
1990	37,993		28.1%
2000	47,996		26.3%
2010	62,209		29.6%
2020	67,311		8.2%
2025 (est.)	69,848		3.8%
U.S. Decennial Census; 2010-2020

Shawnee is the seventh largest city in the Kansas City Metropolitan Area.

Shawnee city, Kansas – Racial and ethnic composition Note: the US Census treats Hispanic/Latino as an ethnic category. This table excludes Latinos from the racial categories and assigns them to a separate category. Hispanics/Latinos may be of any race.
Race / Ethnicity (NH = Non-Hispanic)	Pop 2000	Pop 2010	Pop 2020	% 2000	% 2010	% 2020
White alone (NH)	42,344	50,862	51,170	88.22%	81.76%	76.02%
Black or African American alone (NH)	1,409	3,227	3,749	2.94%	5.19%	5.57%
Native American or Alaska Native alone (NH)	125	186	236	0.26%	0.30%	0.35%
Asian alone (NH)	1,261	1,876	2,116	2.63%	3.02%	3.14%
Native Hawaiian or Pacific Islander alone (NH)	13	46	30	0.03%	0.07%	0.04%
Other race alone (NH)	57	73	200	0.12%	0.12%	0.30%
Mixed race or Multiracial (NH)	694	1,287	3,609	1.45%	2.07%	5.36%
Hispanic or Latino (any race)	2,093	4,652	6,201	4.36%	7.48%	9.21%
Total	47,996	62,209	67,311	100.00%	100.00%	100.00%

=== 2020 census ===
As of the 2020 census, Shawnee had a population of 67,311, with 25,631 households and 18,131 families. The population density was 1,603.6 per square mile (619.1/km^{2}).

There were 26,465 housing units at an average density of 630.5 per square mile (243.4/km^{2}), of which 3.2% were vacant. The homeowner vacancy rate was 0.7% and the rental vacancy rate was 5.0%.

24.9% of residents were under the age of 18, 7.8% were from 18 to 24, 26.5% were from 25 to 44, 26.1% were from 45 to 64, and 14.7% were 65 years of age or older. The median age was 38.4 years. For every 100 females there were 95.6 males, and for every 100 females age 18 and over there were 94.0 males age 18 and over.

97.0% of residents lived in urban areas, while 3.0% lived in rural areas.

Of the 25,631 households, 35.0% had children under the age of 18 living in them. Of all households, 56.2% were married-couple households, 15.3% were households with a male householder and no spouse or partner present, and 23.0% were households with a female householder and no spouse or partner present. About 23.5% of all households were made up of individuals and 8.6% had someone living alone who was 65 years of age or older. The average household size was 2.7 and the average family size was 3.2.

Racial composition as of the 2020 census
Race	Number	Percent
White	52,622	78.2%
Black or African American	3,842	5.7%
American Indian and Alaska Native	338	0.5%
Asian	2,136	3.2%
Native Hawaiian and Other Pacific Islander	32	0.0%
Some other race	2,065	3.1%
Two or more races	6,276	9.3%

2016–2020 ACS estimates

The percent of those with a bachelor's degree or higher was estimated to be 33.9% of the population.

The 2016–2020 5-year American Community Survey estimates show that the median household income was $88,941 (with a margin of error of +/- $3,643) and the median family income was $106,647 (+/- $4,136). Males had a median income of $52,478 (+/- $2,711) versus $36,976 (+/- $2,729) for females. The median income for those above 16 years old was $42,959 (+/- $2,376).

Approximately, 4.0% of families and 5.5% of the population were below the poverty line, including 6.8% of those under the age of 18 and 4.6% of those ages 65 or over.

=== 2010 census ===
As of the census of 2010, there were 62,209 people, 23,651 households, and 16,876 families residing in the city. The population density was 1,463.7 inhabitants per square mile (565.1/km^{2}). There were 24,954 housing units at an average density of 587.1 per square mile (226.7/km^{2}). The racial makeup of the city was 86.3% White, 5.3% African American, 0.4% Native American, 3.0% Asian, 0.1% Pacific Islander, 2.3% from other races, and 2.6% from two or more races. Hispanic or Latino of any race were 7.5% of the population.

There were 23,651 households, of which 36.8% had children under the age of 18 living with them, 57.7% were married couples living together, 9.8% had a female householder with no husband present, and 28.6% were non-families. 23.1% of all households were made up of individuals, and 6.0% had someone living alone who was 65 years of age or older. The average household size was 2.61 and the average family size was 3.11 persons.

In the city, the population was spread out, with 27.7% under the age of 18, 6.9% from 18 to 24, 28.7% from 25 to 44, 26.6% from 45 to 64, and 10.1% who were 65 years of age or older. The median age was 36.4 years. For every 100 females, there were 97.8 males. For every 100 females age 18 and over, there were 95.8 males.

== Economy ==
=== Top employers ===
According to the town's 2020 Comprehensive Annual Financial Report, the top employers in the city are:

#	Employer	# of Employees
1	FedEx Ground Package System, Inc.	575
2	Bayer HealthCare, LLC-Animal Div	550
3	First Student	400
4	Shawnee, City of	330
4	Wal-Mart Super Center	300
5	Nazdar Industries	280
7	Hy-Vee Food Stores	250
8	KU MedWest	225
9	Target Super Store	190
10	Kraft Tool Company	180

== Government ==
Shawnee has a council–manager government. Mayor and councilmembers are elected to four year terms. Each ward has two representatives whose terms are staggered by two years. However, the elections of April 2010 and 2012 will serve for three years. The day-to-day operations are managed by the city manager.

== Education ==
- USD 512 Shawnee Mission School District
- USD 232 De Soto School District
- Maranatha Christian Academy
- Kansas City, Kansas Archdiocese Catholic Schools
- Midland Adventist Academy
- Hope Lutheran School

== Libraries and museums ==
Two branches of the Johnson County Library serves the Shawnee Mission area. The Library includes 13 locations throughout Johnson County, including the Monticello and Shawnee Libraries. Shawnee Town 1929 Museum and Wonderscope Children's Museum are also located within the city.

== Media ==
Shawnee is in the Kansas City metropolitan area's television and radio markets. The Shawnee Dispatch was a weekly newspaper published by the Lawrence Journal-World and The World Company which ceased operation in November 2018. The Shawnee Mission Post provides local media coverage for city, along with other cities within the Shawnee Mission area.

== Transportation ==
Johnson County Transit provides local bus service to the city. The nearest intercity transit is located in Kansas City at the Kansas City Union Station and Kansas City Bus Station.

== Notable people ==
Notable individuals who were born in and/or have lived in Shawnee include energy executive Linda Cook, former Attorney General of Kansas Phill Kline, and comedian Chris Porter.

== Sister cities ==
- Erfurt, Thuringia, Germany
- Listowel, County Kerry, Ireland
- Pittem, Belgium
