= 2018 Kansas gubernatorial election =

- November 6, 2018
- Turnout: 57.6%
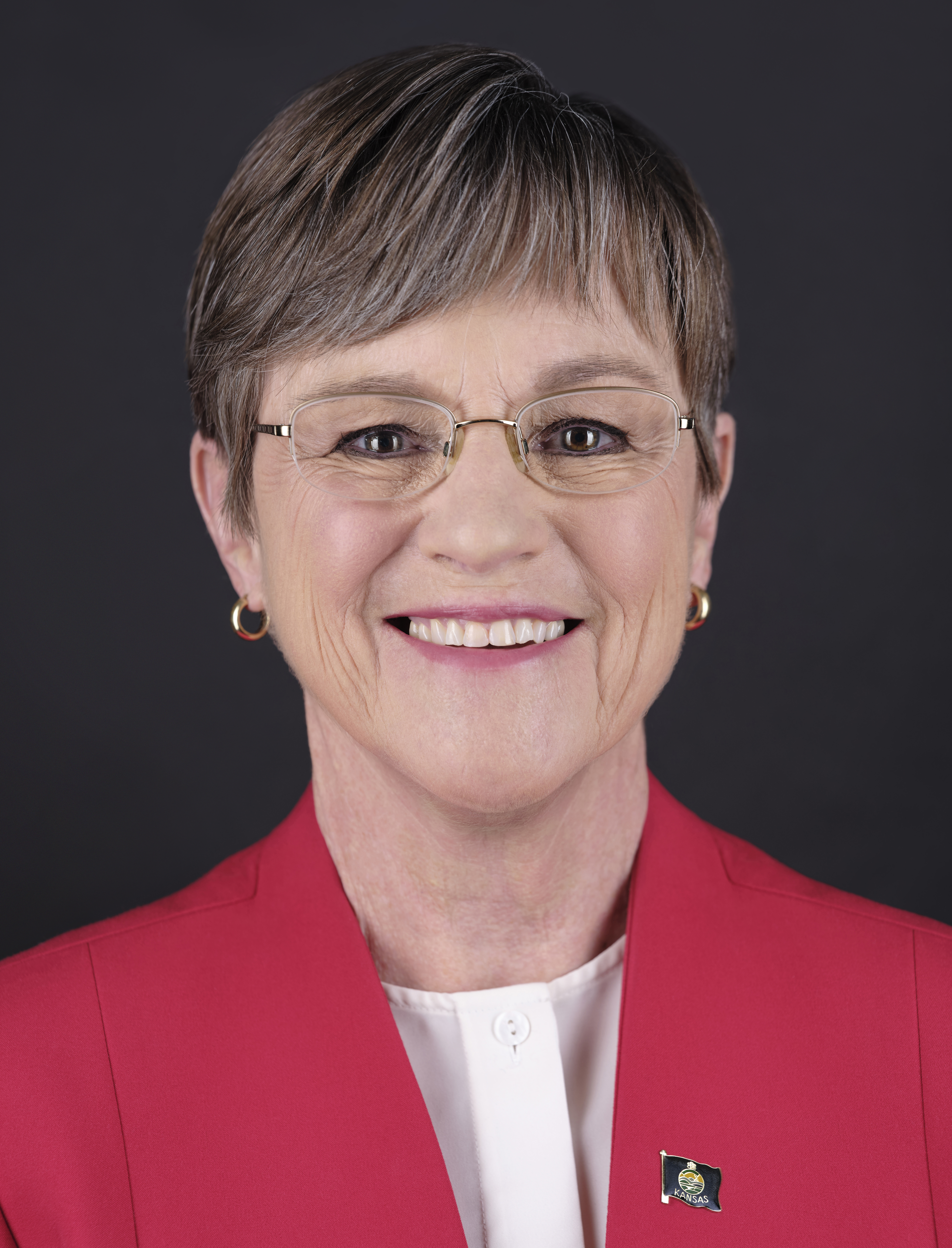

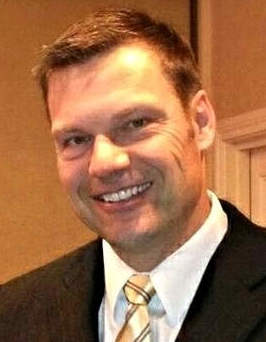

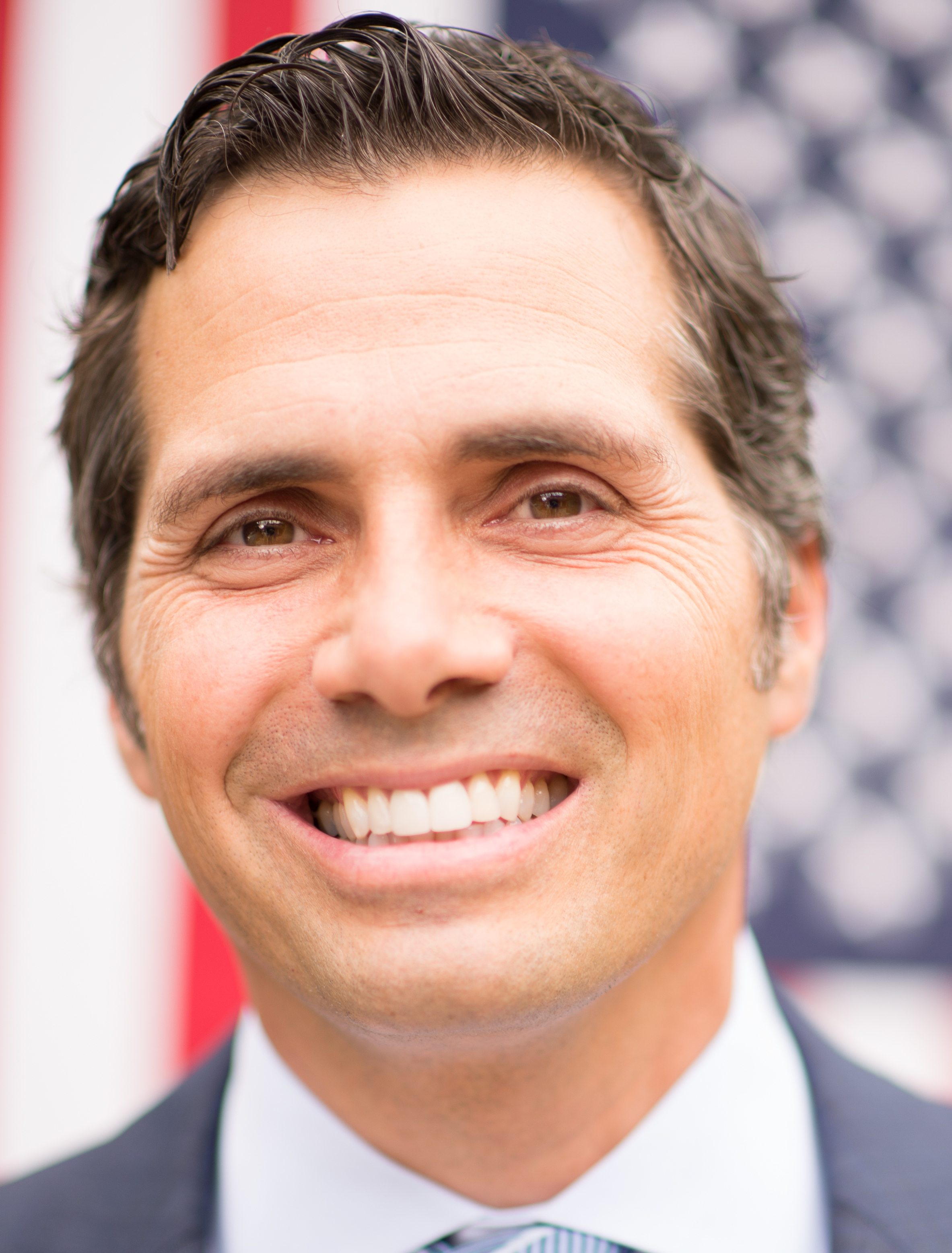
Nominee	Laura Kelly	Kris Kobach	Greg Orman
Party	Democratic	Republican	Independent
Running mate	Lynn Rogers	Wink Hartman	John Doll
Popular vote	506,509	453,030	68,590
Percentage	48.03%	42.96%	6.50%
- Kelly: 30–40% 40–50% 50–60% 60–70% 70–80% 80–90% >90% Kobach: 30–40% 40–50% 50–60% 60–70% 70–80% 80–90% >90% Tie: No votes
Governor before election
Jeff Colyer
Republican
Elected Governor
Laura Kelly
Democratic

The 2018 Kansas gubernatorial election took place on November 6, 2018, to elect the next governor of Kansas. Democratic state senator Laura Kelly defeated Republican state secretary of state Kris Kobach to win her first term in office.

On July 26, 2017, Governor Sam Brownback was nominated by President Donald Trump to serve as United States Ambassador-at-Large for International Religious Freedom. He was confirmed by the United States Senate on January 24, 2018; he resigned the governorship on January 31 and was succeeded by Lieutenant Governor Jeff Colyer. Colyer was eligible to seek a full term and announced his candidacy prior to becoming Governor of Kansas. In the August 7 primary, Colyer ran against CPA and incumbent Insurance Commissioner Ken Selzer, Topeka doctor and 2006 Republican Kansas gubernatorial nominee Jim Barnett, and Kobach.

On August 7, 2018, Kobach defeated Colyer in the Republican gubernatorial primary by an initial margin of 191 votes, a lead that increased to 361 votes by August 14, although discrepancies in some counties needed resolution and provisional and absentee ballots may not have been counted in some counties. Colyer conceded the Republican nomination after the final votes were tallied, in which Kobach's margin grew slightly. Kelly easily won the Democratic nomination and won the general election, assuming office on January 14, 2019. Businessman Greg Orman, who finished second as an independent in the 2014 U.S. Senate race against incumbent Republican Pat Roberts, ran for governor as an independent candidate.

As, aside from a two-term limit for incumbents, the Constitution of Kansas places no limitations of any kind on who may seek the office, several teenagers (including one who had never been to the state), filed to run for governor, drawing media attention. A debate took place on September 5 between the three candidates that consistently polled above 5%. Polls in late August had Kelly and Kobach running close with Orman polling in the single digits.

Kelly's win continued a streak of party turnover for governor of Kansas, as Kansas has not elected two consecutive governors of the same party since William Avery succeeded fellow Republican John Anderson Jr. following the 1964 election, and neither major party has held the governorship for longer than eight consecutive years since Republican John McCuish left office in 1957. Kobach would later unsuccessfully run in the 2020 Republican primary for U.S. Senate in Kansas, before successfully running for Kansas Attorney General in 2022.

== Republican primary ==
=== Candidates ===
==== Nominated ====
- Kris Kobach, Secretary of State of Kansas and nominee for KS-03 in 2004
  - Running mate: Wink Hartman, businessman and candidate for KS-04 in 2010

==== Eliminated in primary ====
- Jim Barnett, former state senator, nominee for governor in 2006 and candidate for KS-01 in 2010
  - Running mate: Rosemary Hansen, Barnett's wife
- Jeff Colyer, incumbent governor and candidate for KS-03 in 2002
  - Running mate: Tracey Mann, incumbent lieutenant governor
- Patrick Kucera, businessman
  - Running mate: Patricia Reitz
- Tyler Ruzich, high school student
  - Running mate: Dominic Scavuzzo, high school student
- Ken Selzer, Kansas Insurance Commissioner
  - Running mate: Jen Sanderson, businesswoman
- Joseph Tutera Jr., high school student
  - Running mate: Phillip Clemente, high school student

==== Withdrew ====
- Wink Hartman, businessman and candidate for KS-04 in 2010 (ran for lieutenant governor), joined Kris Kobach's campaign as his lieutenant gubernatorial candidate.

=== Endorsements ===
Jeff Colyer

Local and statewide politicians

- Bob Dole, former US senator for Kansas and 1996 Republican nominee for president
- Mark Hutton, state representative
- Jeff Longbine, Senate vice president
- Scott Walker, governor of Wisconsin

Organizations

- Kansans for Life
- Kansas Farm Bureau
- Kansas Livestock Association
- Kansas State Troopers Association
- NRA Political Victory Fund

=== Polling ===
Poll source	Date(s) administered	Sample size	Margin of error	Jim Barnett	Jeff Colyer	Wink Hartman	Kris Kobach	Ken Selzer	Other	Undecided
Remington (R)	August 3–5, 2018	2,769	± 2.0%	14%	34%	–	32%	9%	3%	10%
The Trafalgar Group (R)	July 30 – August 2, 2018	1,546	± 2.4%	11%	36%	–	43%	5%	4%	–
Remington (R)	August 2, 2018	859	± 3.3%	13%	32%	–	32%	9%	3%	11%
JMC Analytics (R-Kobach)	July 24–26, 2018	500	± 4.4%	11%	25%	–	34%	8%	2%	20%
Remington (R)	May 14–15, 2018	1,441	± 2.6%	9%	29%	–	27%	5%	–	30%
JMC Analytics (R-Kobach)	March 15–17, 2018	500	± 4.4%	10%	18%	–	31%	4%	–	36%
Remington (R)	February 13–14, 2018	1,806	± 2.3%	8%	23%	5%	21%	3%	3%	37%
Moore Information (R)	February 11, 2018	–	–	–	20%	6%	26%	11%	–	38%

=== Results ===
County results Kobach: 30–40%; 40–50%; 50–60%; Colyer: 30–40%; 40–50%; 50–60%; 70–80%; Kobach/Colyer tie: 40–50%; Selzer: 30–40%

Republican primary results
Party	Candidate	Votes	%
Republican	Kris Kobach	128,838	40.62
Republican	Jeff Colyer (incumbent)	128,488	40.51
Republican	Jim Barnett	27,993	8.83
Republican	Ken Selzer	24,807	7.82
Republican	Patrick Kucera	3,212	1.01
Republican	Tyler Ruzich	2,276	0.72
Republican	Joseph Tutera Jr.	1,559	0.49
Total votes		317,173	100.0

== Democratic primary ==
=== Candidates ===
==== Nominated ====
- Laura Kelly, state senator
  - Running mate: Lynn Rogers, state senator

==== Eliminated in primary ====
- Arden Andersen, physician
  - Running mate: Dale Cowsert, businessman
- Jack Bergeson, high school student
  - Running mate: Alexander Cline, high school student
- Carl Brewer, former Mayor of Wichita
  - Running mate: Chris Morrow, former mayor of Gardner
- Josh Svaty, former Kansas Secretary of Agriculture and former state representative
  - Running mate: Katrina Gier Lewison, Manhattan-Ogden USD 383 Board of Education member, veteran

==== Withdrew ====
- Jim Ward, minority leader of the Kansas House of Representatives

==== Declined ====
- Paul Davis, former minority leader of the Kansas House of Representatives and nominee for governor in 2014 (running for KS-02)

=== Endorsements ===
Josh Svaty

Statewide and local politicians

- Tom Burroughs, Democratic member of the Kansas House of Representatives, former House minority leader
- John W. Carlin, former governor of Kansas and former Archivist of the United States
- Rep. Pam Curtis, D-32nd Dist.
- Rep. Stan Frownfelter, D-37th Dist.
- Bill Graves, Republican former governor of Kansas
- Rep. Broderick Henderson, D-35th Dist.
- Lee Kinch, former Kansas Democratic Party chairman
- Rep. Adam Lusker, D-2nd Dist.
- Rep. Cindy Neighbor, D-18th Dist.
- Rep. Eber Phelps, D-111th Dist.
- State Rep. Jason Probst, D-Hutchinson
- Rep. Louis Ruiz, D-31st Dist.
- Rep. Tom Sawyer, D-95th Dist.
- Rep. Jerry Stogsdill, D-21st Dist.

=== Polling ===
Poll source	Date(s) administered	Sample size	Margin of error	Arden Andersen	Jack Bergeson	Carl Brewer	Laura Kelly	Josh Svaty	Undecided
GBA Strategies (D-Kelly)	June 5–7, 2018	500	± 4.4%	3%	2%	22%	35%	12%	25%
GBA Strategies (D-Kelly)	June 5–7, 2018	500	± 4.4%	–	–	25%	44%	12%	20%

Hypothetical polling

Poll source	Date(s) administered	Sample size	Margin of error	Laura Kelly	Josh Svaty	Jim Ward	Undecided
Expedition Strategies (D-Ward)	March 4–8, 2018	–	± 4.4%	17%	7%	19%	57%
Moore Information (R)	February 11, 2018	–	–	39%	–	20%	42%

=== Results ===
County results Kelly: 30–40%; 40–50%; 50–60%; 60–70%; 70–80%; Brewer: 30–40%; 40–50%; Svaty: 30–40%; 40–50%; 50–60%; 60–70%; 70–80%; 80–90%

Democratic primary results
Party	Candidate	Votes	%
Democratic	Laura Kelly	78,746	51.5
Democratic	Carl Brewer	30,693	20.1
Democratic	Josh Svaty	26,722	17.5
Democratic	Arden Andersen	12,845	8.4
Democratic	Jack Bergeson	3,850	2.5
Total votes		152,856	100.0

== Independent candidates ==
=== Candidates ===
==== On the ballot ====
- Rick Kloos
  - Running mate: Nathaniel Kloos, son of Rick Kloos
- Greg Orman, businessman and candidate for the U.S. Senate in 2014
  - Running mate: John Doll, state senator

=== Write-in ===
- Aaron Coleman, college student

=== Failed to qualify ===
- Ilan Cohen, high school student from Maryland
- Max Correa, college student from North Carolina
- Joe Larry Hunter, former inmate
- Andy Maskin, New York City Advertiser
  - Running mate: Scott Goodwin, Connecticut Advertiser
- Victor Redko, McGill University student
- Jared Rogers, University of Pennsylvania student
- Nicholas Schrieber, college student from Delaware
  - Running mate: Matthew Ueckermann, college student from Maryland
- Conner Shelton, college student from Pennsylvania

== Libertarian convention ==
=== Candidates ===
==== Nominated ====
- Jeff Caldwell, executive committee member for the Libertarian Party of Kansas
  - Running mate: Mary Gerlt

==== Withdrew ====
- Thomas Padgett

== General election ==
=== Predictions ===
Source	Ranking	As of
The Cook Political Report	Tossup	October 26, 2018
The Washington Post	Tossup	November 5, 2018
FiveThirtyEight	Tossup	November 5, 2018
Rothenberg Political Report	Tossup	November 1, 2018
Sabato's Crystal Ball	Lean D (flip)	November 5, 2018
RealClearPolitics	Tossup	November 4, 2018
Daily Kos	Tossup	November 5, 2018
Fox News (Note: The Fox News Midterm Power Rankings uniquely does not contain a category for Safe/Solid races.)	Tossup	November 5, 2018
Politico	Tossup	November 5, 2018
Governing	Tossup	November 5, 2018

=== Debates ===
Dates	Location	Kelly	Kobach	Orman	Link
September 6, 2018	Overland Park, Kansas	Participant	Participant	Participant	Full debate - YouTube
October 30, 2018	Wichita, Kansas	Participant	Participant	Participant	Full debate - C-SPAN

=== Endorsements ===
Laura Kelly (D)

Federal politicians

- Sheila Frahm, former U.S. senator (R-KS) and former lieutenant governor of Kansas
- Eric Holder, former U.S. attorney general
- Nancy Kassebaum, former U.S. senator (R-KS)
- Amy Klobuchar, U.S. senator (D-MN)

Statewide officials

- John W. Carlin, former governor of Kansas
- Duane Goossen, former Kansas Secretary of Administration and former director of the Kansas Division of the Budget
- Bill Graves, former governor of Kansas and former Kansas secretary of state (Republican)
- Mike Hayden, former governor of Kansas (Republican)
- Terry McAuliffe, former governor of Virginia
- Mark Parkinson, former governor of Kansas
- Sandy Praeger, former Kansas insurance commissioner (Republican)
- Kathleen Sebelius, former governor of Kansas and former U.S. Health and Human Services Secretary
- Gary Sherrer, former lieutenant governor of Kansas (Republican)

State legislators

- Barbara Allen, former state senator (Republican)
- Ginger Barr, former state representative (Republican)
- Barbara Bollier, state senator (Republican, later Democratic)
- Dick Bond, former president of the Kansas Senate (Republican)
- Pete Brungardt, former state senator (Republican)
- Rochelle Chronister, former state representative and former chairperson of the Kansas Republican Party (Republican)
- Paul Davis, former state representative and 2014 nominee for governor
- Tim Emert, former majority leader of the Kansas Senate (Republican)
- Terrie Huntington, former state senator and former state representative (Republican)
- Dave Kerr, former president of the Kansas Senate (Republican)
- Joy Koesten, state representative (Republican)
- Audrey Langworthy, former state senator (Republican)
- Fred Lorentz, former state representative (Republican)
- Jim Lowther, former state representative (Republican)
- Lana Oleen, former majority leader of the Kansas Senate (Republican)
- Tim Owens, former state senator (Republican)
- Jo Ann Pottorff, former state representative (Republican)
- Charlie Roth, former state representative (Republican)
- Alicia Salisbury, former vice president of the Kansas Senate (Republican)
- Ruth Teichman, former state senator (Republican)
- John Vratil, former vice president of the Kansas Senate (Republican)
- Wint Winter Jr., former state senator (Republican)
- David Wysong, former state senator (Republican)
- Jim Yonally, former state representative (Republican)

Labor unions

- American Federation of Teachers-Kansas Affiliate
- International Brotherhood of Electrical Workers Local 124
- Kansas Fraternal Order of Police State Lodge
- Kansas National Education Association
- Kansas State AFL-CIO
- Missouri Kansas Alliance of Teamsters
- National Education Association
- St. Louis - Kansas City Carpenters Regional Council
- United Automobile Workers
- United Steelworkers District 11

Organizations

- EMILY's List
- Kansas Equality Coalition
- Planned Parenthood Action Fund
- Sierra Club Kansas Chapter

Newspapers and news websites

- The Kansas City Star
- The Topeka Capital-Journal
- The Wichita Eagle
Kris Kobach (R)

U.S. executive branch officials

- John Ashcroft, former United States attorney general
- Mike Pence, vice president of the United States
- Donald Trump, president of the United States

U.S. senators

- Pat Roberts (R-KS)

U.S. representatives

- Ron Estes (KS-04)

Statewide officials

- Jeff Colyer, Governor of Kansas

State legislators

- J. R. Claeys, state representative
- Susan Wagle, Senate president

Local officials

- Brian Linin, Goodland mayor

Individuals

- Joe Arpaio, former sheriff of Maricopa County, Arizona
- Ann Coulter, conservative commentator
- Sean Hannity, political commentator and talk show host
- Ted Nugent, singer-songwriter
- Donald Trump Jr., businessman and son of U.S. president Donald Trump

Organizations

- Kansans for Life
- Kansas Chamber of Commerce
- Kansas State Council of Firefighters
- NRA Political Victory Fund
Greg Orman (I)

Organizations

- Unite America

=== Polling ===
View source data.

Poll source	Date(s) administered	Sample size	Margin of error	Kris Kobach (R)	Laura Kelly (D)	Greg Orman (I)	Jeff Caldwell (L)	Other	Undecided
Emerson College	October 26–28, 2018	976	± 3.3%	44%	43%	8%	–	1%	4%
Ipsos	October 17–27, 2018	986	± 3.6%	41%	43%	9%	–	2%	5%
Public Policy Polling (D-Western States Strategies)	October 19–20, 2018	698	± 3.7%	41%	41%	10%	2%	0%	6%
Remington (R)	September 30 – October 1, 2018	1,680	± 2.4%	41%	42%	10%	2%	1%	4%
Emerson College	September 26–28, 2018	938	± 3.5%	37%	36%	9%	–	3%	15%
Fort Hays State University	August 22 – September 25, 2018	324	–	36%	40%	10%	–	5%	–
Civiqs (D-Crawford County Dems)	September 21–24, 2018	1,178	± 3.4%	39%	41%	9%	5%	0%	5%
Public Policy Polling (D-Pottawatomie County Dems)	September 12–13, 2018	618	–	39%	38%	9%	1%	2%	12%
Public Policy Polling (D-KNEA PAC)	August 24–26, 2018	877	–	39%	38%	9%	1%	2%	11%
Remington (R)	July 19–20, 2018	1,189	± 2.9%	35%	36%	12%	–	–	17%

Hypothetical polling

with Kris Kobach and Laura Kelly

Poll source	Date(s) administered	Sample size	Margin of error	Kris Kobach (R)	Laura Kelly (D)	Undecided
Triton Polling & Research (I-Grow Kansas Action Fund)	October 2018	785	± 3.1%	49%	47%	–
Public Policy Polling (D-Western States Strategies)	October 17–21, 2018	698	± 3.7%	44%	48%	8%
Public Policy Polling	September 12–13, 2018	618	–	47%	46%	8%
Triton Polling & Research (I-Grow Kansas Action Fund)	August 2018	–	–	46%	46%	8%

with Kris Kobach and Greg Orman

Poll source	Date(s) administered	Sample size	Margin of error	Kris Kobach (R)	Greg Orman (I)	Undecided
Triton Polling & Research (I-Grow Kansas Action Fund)	October 2018	785	± 3.1%	43%	49%	–
Triton Polling & Research (I-Grow Kansas Action Fund)	August 2018	–	–	40%	53%	8%

with Jeff Colyer

Poll source	Date(s) administered	Sample size	Margin of error	Jeff Colyer (R)	Laura Kelly (D)	Greg Orman (I)	Undecided
Remington (R)	July 19–20, 2018	1,189	± 2.9%	38%	28%	10%	24%

with generic Republican, Democrat, and Independent

Poll source	Date(s) administered	Sample size	Margin of error	Generic Republican	Generic Democrat	Generic Independent	Undecided
Remington (R)	July 19–20, 2018	1,189	± 2.9%	47%	35%	8%	10%

=== Results ===
Support for Orman by county: >16% 14–16% 12–14% 10–12% 8–10% 6–8% 4–6% 2–4%

Kansas gubernatorial election, 2018
Party	Candidate	Votes	%	±%
Democratic	Laura Kelly	506,509	48.03%	+1.90%
Republican	Kris Kobach	453,030	42.96%	−6.86%
Independent	Greg Orman	68,498	6.50%	N/A
Libertarian	Jeff Caldwell	20,009	1.90%	−2.15%
Independent	Rick Kloos	6,576	0.62%	N/A
Total votes		1,054,622	100.00%	N/A
Democratic gain from Republican				

==== By county ====
County	Laura Kelly Democratic		Kris Kobach Republican		Greg Orman Independent		All others		Margin		Total
County	#	%	#	%	#	%	#	%	#	%	Total
Allen	1,795	40.5%	2,292	51.7%	163	3.7%	186	3.2%	−497	−11.2%	4,436
Anderson	957	34.6%	1,596	57.7%	127	4.6%	85	3.0%	−639	−23.1%	2,765
Atchison	2,447	44.7%	2,558	46.7%	281	5.1%	186	3.4%	−111	−2.0%	5,472
Barber	396	22.5%	1,155	65.7%	158	9.0%	48	2.7%	−759	−43.2%	1,757
Barton	2,645	30.8%	4,841	56.4%	868	10.1%	233	2.7%	−2,196	−25.6%	8,587
Bourbon	1,576	31.9%	2,970	60.2%	175	3.5%	212	4.3%	−1,394	−28.3%	4,933
Brown	1,133	33.4%	1,836	54.2%	320	9.4%	99	2.9%	−703	−20.8%	3,388
Butler	8,651	36.1%	12,822	53.5%	1,901	7.9%	603	2.5%	−4,171	−17.4%	23,967
Chase	440	36.1%	653	53.6%	87	7.1%	38	3.1%	−213	−17.5%	1,218
Chautauqua	252	22.2%	808	71.2%	47	4.1%	28	2.5%	−556	−49.0%	1,135
Cherokee	2,314	33.1%	4,284	61.3%	200	2.9%	193	2.8%	−1,970	−28.2%	6,991
Cheyenne	248	22.8%	733	67.4%	79	7.3%	27	2.4%	−485	−44.6%	1,087
Clark	181	21.3%	521	61.4%	120	14.1%	27	3.2%	−340	−40.1%	849
Clay	1,040	32.7%	1,743	54.9%	282	8.9%	111	3.5%	−703	−22.2%	3,176
Cloud	1,092	33.7%	1,744	53.8%	277	8.5%	130	4.0%	−652	−20.1%	3,243
Coffey	1,082	31.1%	1,926	55.4%	340	9.8%	127	3.6%	−844	−24.3%	3,475
Comanche	170	23.8%	453	63.4%	66	9.2%	26	3.7%	−283	−39.6%	715
Cowley	4,221	40.1%	5,165	49.1%	913	8.7%	230	2.1%	−944	−9.0%	10,529
Crawford	6,294	48.9%	5,662	44.0%	454	3.5%	468	3.6%	632	4.9%	12,878
Decatur	287	25.4%	736	65.2%	86	7.6%	20	1.7%	−449	−39.8%	1,129
Dickinson	2,265	33.5%	3,790	56.0%	516	7.6%	191	2.8%	−1,525	−22.5%	6,762
Doniphan	749	28.8%	1,699	65.4%	83	3.2%	68	2.6%	−950	−36.6%	2,599
Douglas	36,678	74.1%	10,154	20.5%	1,749	3.5%	937	1.9%	26,524	53.6%	49,518
Edwards	307	26.9%	692	60.6%	119	10.4%	24	2.1%	−385	−43.7%	1,142
Elk	277	26.2%	669	63.3%	83	7.9%	28	2.6%	−392	−47.1%	1,057
Ellis	4,243	40.6%	5,138	49.2%	801	7.7%	265	2.5%	−895	−8.6%	10,447
Ellsworth	840	36.5%	1,168	50.8%	241	10.5%	52	2.2%	−328	−14.3%	2,301
Finney	3,192	36.8%	3,891	44.8%	1,451	16.7%	146	1.7%	−699	−8.0%	8,680
Ford	2,582	36.3%	3,574	50.2%	780	11.0%	179	2.5%	−992	−13.9%	7,115
Franklin	3,806	40.6%	4,742	50.6%	559	6.0%	269	2.8%	−936	−10.0%	9,376
Geary	2,703	43.8%	2,769	44.9%	487	7.9%	210	3.4%	-66	-1.1%	6,169
Gove	256	23.4%	720	65.7%	100	9.1%	20	1.8%	−464	−42.3%	1,096
Graham	284	26.3%	671	62.1%	80	7.4%	45	4.2%	−387	−35.8%	1,080
Grant	451	24.6%	1,096	59.7%	251	13.7%	37	2.0%	−645	−35.1%	1,835
Gray	347	19.4%	1,138	63.5%	273	15.2%	33	1.9%	−791	−44.1%	1,791
Greeley	118	23.7%	313	62.9%	55	11.0%	12	2.4%	−195	−39.2%	498
Greenwood	653	30.6%	1,214	56.9%	209	9.8%	59	2.8%	−561	−26.3%	2,135
Hamilton	166	26.3%	373	59.2%	79	12.5%	12	1.9%	−207	−32.9%	630
Harper	570	27.9%	1,243	60.8%	193	9.4%	40	2.0%	−673	−42.9%	2,046
Harvey	6,450	47.0%	5,872	42.8%	1,079	7.9%	321	2.3%	578	4.2%	13,722
Haskell	287	25.3%	681	60.1%	143	12.6%	23	2.0%	−394	−34.8%	1,134
Hodgeman	167	18.9%	597	67.6%	100	11.3%	19	2.2%	−430	−48.7%	883
Jackson	2,088	39.3%	2,565	48.3%	492	9.3%	164	3.1%	−477	−9.0%	5,309
Jefferson	3,306	43.7%	3,485	46.1%	593	7.8%	178	2.3%	−179	−2.4%	7,562
Jewell	294	24.9%	765	64.7%	88	7.4%	36	3.0%	−471	−39.8%	1,183
Johnson	148,082	54.7%	102,813	38.0%	13,750	5.1%	6,206	2.3%	45,269	16.7%	270,851
Kearny	286	26.1%	687	62.7%	107	9.8%	15	1.3%	−401	−36.6%	1,095
Kingman	891	29.8%	1,764	58.9%	284	9.5%	54	1.8%	−873	−29.1%	2,993
Kiowa	218	23.1%	615	65.1%	92	9.7%	19	2.0%	−397	−42.0%	944
Labette	2,646	41.7%	3,273	51.6%	202	3.2%	220	3.4%	−627	−9.9%	6,34`
Lane	174	24.2%	437	60.8%	101	14.0%	7	1.0%	−263	−36.6%	719
Leavenworth	11,802	44.8%	12,379	47.0%	1,376	5.2%	783	2.9%	−577	−2.2%	26,340
Lincoln	383	30.6%	769	61.4%	72	5.8%	28	2.3%	−386	−30.8%	1,252
Linn	1,091	29.0%	2,401	63.7%	185	4.9%	90	2.4%	−1,310	−34.7%	3,767
Logan	255	21.9%	785	67.6%	97	8.3%	25	2.1%	−530	−45.7%	1,162
Lyon	5,679	52.1%	3,920	36.0%	943	8.7%	357	3.2%	1,759	16.1%	10,899
Marion	1,785	36.7%	2,564	52.7%	423	8.7%	90	1.9%	−779	−16.0%	4,862
Marshall	1,449	41.5%	1,581	45.3%	392	11.2%	66	1.9%	−132	−3.8%	3,488
McPherson	4,440	39.1%	5,832	51.4%	895	7.9%	182	1.6%	−1,392	−12.3%	11,349
Meade	311	22.3%	914	65.6%	136	9.8%	33	2.4%	−603	−43.3%	1,394
Miami	4,842	37.0%	7,160	54.7%	758	5.8%	340	2.5%	−2,318	−17.7%	13,100
Mitchell	876	35.1%	1,375	55.0%	199	8.0%	49	2.0%	−499	−19.9%	2,999
Montgomery	2,931	30.0%	6,133	62.7%	382	3.9%	340	3.5%	−3,202	−32.7%	9,786
Morris	898	39.9%	1,106	49.2%	202	9.0%	44	2.0%	−208	−9.3%	2,250
Morton	184	20.3%	626	69.0%	80	8.8%	17	1.9%	−442	−48.7%	907
Nemaha	1,415	30.9%	2,605	56.9%	445	9.7%	115	2.6%	−1,190	−26.0%	4,580
Neosho	2,069	38.0%	2,930	53.9%	247	4.5%	194	3.5%	−861	−15.9%	5,440
Ness	250	21.2%	808	68.6%	112	9.5%	8	0.7%	−558	−47.4%	1,178
Norton	511	27.0%	1,187	62.8%	142	7.5%	51	2.7%	−676	−35.8%	1,891
Osage	2,525	40.0%	2,964	47.0%	616	9.8%	201	3.2%	−439	−7.0%	6,306
Osborne	413	27.6%	907	60.5%	145	9.7%	33	2.2%	−494	−42.9%	1,498
Ottawa	669	27.4%	1,497	61.4%	204	8.4%	68	2.8%	−828	−44.0%	2,438
Pawnee	837	37.3%	1,145	51.1%	208	9.3%	52	2.3%	−308	−13.8%	2,242
Phillips	518	23.9%	1,419	65.4%	179	8.2%	54	2.5%	−901	−41.5%	2,170
Pottawatomie	3,344	34.0%	5,384	54.8%	890	9.1%	203	2.1%	−2,040	−20.8%	9,821
Pratt	1,221	37.4%	1,701	52.0%	283	8.7%	64	1.9%	−480	−14.6%	3,269
Rawlins	333	27.4%	771	63.4%	98	8.1%	14	1.2%	−438	−36.0%	1,216
Reno	8,799	41.9%	9,892	47.1%	1,809	8.6%	522	2.5%	−1,093	−5.2%	21,022
Republic	592	29.2%	1,245	61.5%	131	6.5%	57	2.8%	−653	−32.3%	2,025
Rice	963	31.2%	1,729	56.0%	311	10.1%	85	2.7%	−766	−24.8%	3,088
Riley	11,280	56.8%	6,514	32.8%	1,536	7.7%	532	2.7%	4,766	24.0%	19,862
Rooks	506	23.5%	1,409	65.5%	157	7.3%	79	3.7%	−903	−42.0%	2,151
Rush	403	30.9%	754	57.8%	116	8.9%	31	2.4%	−351	−26.9%	1,304
Russell	783	29.1%	1,564	58.2%	281	10.5%	59	2.2%	−781	−29.1%	2,687
Saline	8,181	44.5%	8,384	45.6%	1,279	7.0%	535	2.9%	−203	−1.1%	18,379
Scott	324	17.4%	1,244	66.7%	266	14.3%	30	1.6%	−920	−49.3%	1,864
Sedgwick	81,011	48.2%	70,879	42.2%	11,983	7.1%	4,030	2.4%	10,132	6.0%	167,903
Seward	1,394	36.5%	2,009	52.7%	311	8.2%	101	2.6%	−615	−16.2%	3,815
Shawnee	40,936	57.9%	23,933	33.9%	4,080	5.8%	1,725	2.5%	17,003	24.0%	70,674
Sheridan	219	19.2%	795	69.9%	99	8.7%	25	2.2%	−576	−50.7%	1,138
Sherman	510	24.3%	1,376	65.4%	178	8.5%	39	1.9%	−866	−31.1%	2,103
Smith	418	25.9%	1,074	66.5%	90	5.6%	32	2.0%	−656	−40.6%	1,614
Stafford	458	28.3%	950	58.6%	167	10.3%	45	2.8%	−492	−30.3%	1,620
Stanton	148	24.7%	376	62.9%	63	10.5%	11	1.8%	−228	−38.2%	598
Stevens	274	18.1%	1,042	68.7%	177	11.7%	24	1.6%	−768	−50.6%	1,517
Sumner	2,827	35.4%	4,203	52.6%	761	9.5%	203	2.5%	−1,376	−17.2%	7,994
Thomas	813	26.9%	1,856	61.3%	284	9.4%	74	2.4%	−1,043	−34.4%	3,027
Trego	348	27.4%	755	59.5%	149	11.7%	17	1.3%	−407	−32.1%	1,269
Wabaunsee	1,233	39.2%	1,582	50.3%	266	8.4%	67	2.1%	−349	−11.1%	3,148
Wallace	106	16.0%	506	76.6%	41	6.2%	8	1.2%	−400	−60.6%	661
Washington	626	27.6%	1,342	59.2%	253	11.2%	46	2.0%	−716	−31.6%	2,267
Wichita	129	17.0%	560	73.9%	64	8.4%	5	0.7%	−431	−56.9%	758
Wilson	921	30.9%	1,869	62.7%	107	3.6%	84	2.8%	−948	−31.8%	2,981
Woodson	394	33.4%	693	58.7%	55	4.7%	38	3.2%	−299	−25.3%	1,180
Wyandotte	28,285	67.1%	10,526	25.0%	1,691	4.0%	1,624	3.8%	17,759	42.1%	42,126
TOTALS	506,509	48.0%	453,030	43.0%	68,498	6.5%	26,585	2.5%	53,479	5.0%	1,054,622

Counties that flipped from Republican to Democratic

- Harvey (largest city: Newton)
- Johnson (largest municipality: Overland Park)
- Sedgwick (largest municipality: Wichita)

Counties that flipped from Democratic to Republican

- Jefferson (largest municipality: Valley Falls)

==== By congressional district ====
Kelly won two of four congressional districts, including one that was carried by a Republican in the concurrent congressional elections.

District	Kelly	Kobach	Orman	Representative
1st	37%	51%	9%	Roger Marshall
2nd	51%	41%	5%	Lynn Jenkins (115th Congress)
2nd	51%	41%	5%	Steve Watkins (116th Congress)
3rd	56%	37%	5%	Kevin Yoder (115th Congress)
3rd	56%	37%	5%	Sharice Davids (116th Congress)
4th	44.7%	45.4%	8%	Ron Estes
