= Jerry Karr =

American farmer and politician (1936–2019)

Member of the Kansas Senate from the 17th district
- In office January 12, 1981 – January 10, 1999
- Preceded by: John Crofoot
- Succeeded by: Harry Stephens

Personal details
- Born: October 15, 1936 Emporia, Kansas, U.S.
- Died: December 8, 2019 (aged 83) Emporia, Kansas, U.S.
- Party: Democratic
- Spouse: Sharon Kay (m. 1959; died 2018)
- Children: 2
- Education: Kansas State University; Southern Illinois University

Military service
- Allegiance: United States
- Branch/service: United States Army
- Years of service: 1959-1965
- Unit: United States Army Reserves

Gerald L. "Jerry" Karr (October 15, 1936 – December 8, 2019) was an American farmer and politician from Kansas.

== Background ==
Karr was born in Emporia, Kansas, on October 15, 1936, and graduated from Americus High School. Karr went to the College of Emporia. He received his bachelor's degree in agricultural economics in 1959, from Kansas State University, and his master's degree in agricultural economics from Southern Illinois University in 1962. Karr served in the United States Army Reserves from 1959 to 1965. He taught economics at University of Central Missouri, Njala University in Sierra Leone, and Wilmington College in Wilmington, Ohio. In 1976, Karr, his wife, and family returned to Kansas and settled on a farm near Emporia, Kansas.

== Political career ==
Karr sat in the Kansas Senate from 1981 to 1999, as a legislator of the 17th district, serving as the minority leader from 1991 to 1996. He resigned on January 10, 1999, and was replaced by Democrat Harry Stephens.

In 2010, Karr attempted to re-enter politics. Following the resignation of Jim Barnett from the 17th district in October 2010, Jeff Longbine was appointed to the seat. Karr contested the November 2010 special election, but lost to Longbine.

Karr died on December 8, 2019, aged 83.
