= Harry Stephens (Kansas politician) =

American educator and politician (1942–2020)

Member of the Kansas Senate from the 17th district
- In office January 10, 1999 – January 8, 2001
- Preceded by: Jerry Karr
- Succeeded by: Jim Barnett

Personal details
- Born: July 14, 1942 Winfield, Kansas, U.S.
- Died: August 29, 2020 (aged 78) Topeka, Kansas, U.S.
- Party: Democratic
- Education: Emporia State University

Harry "Doc" Stephens (July 14, 1942 – August 29, 2020) was an American educator and politician from Kansas.

Stephens earned a bacherlor's and master's degree in counselor education from Emporia State University, where he was advised by Lloyd Stone. He was a member of Sigma Tau Gamma fraternity, having joined in 1961 while an undergraduate; he served the Delta Chapter of Sigma Tau Gamma at Emporia State University as the lead advisor for 50+ years. He earned his doctoral degree from the University of Northern Colorado, and then returned to Emporia State where he worked as an administrator.

In 1996, Stephens, a Democratic Party candidate, faced Stone to succeed James Lowther as the legislator elected from the 60th Kansas House of Representatives District. Stephens lost, but was later appointed to the Kansas Senate from the 17th district in 1999. Stephens lost reelection to Jim Barnett in 2000.

Stephens died Saturday, August 29, 2020.
