= Jim Barnett (Kansas politician) =

American politician

Member of the Kansas Senate from the 17th district
- In office January 8, 2001 – October 1, 2010
- Preceded by: Harry Stephens
- Succeeded by: Jeff Longbine

Personal details
- Born: July 30, 1954 (age 71) Reading, Kansas, U.S.
- Party: Republican
- Spouse: Rosie Hansen
- Children: 2
- Education: Emporia State University (BS); University of Kansas, Kansas City (MD)

James A. Barnett (born July 30, 1954) is an American Republican politician from Kansas. Barnett ran for governor in 2018, ultimately coming in third place in the primary.

Barnett formerly represented the 17th district of the Kansas Senate, which is centered on Emporia. On August 1, 2006, Barnett won the Kansas Republican gubernatorial primary. Barnett faced the incumbent Democratic governor Kathleen Sebelius in the general election on November 7, 2006, and was unsuccessful in his bid as Sebelius was reelected for a second term.

On June 2, 2009, Barnett announced that he was a candidate for the Republican nomination for the United States Congress from the first district of Kansas. On August 3, 2010, Barnett lost the Republican nomination to fellow state senator Tim Huelskamp. Barnett subsequently resigned his state Senate seat, and resumed his medical career at a Topeka, Kansas, clinic.

== 2006 gubernatorial campaign ==
In January 2006 Barnett first announced his candidacy for the Republican nomination for Governor of Kansas. As 2006 progressed, other candidates for the Republican nomination emerged, however none of them were able to match Barnett in campaign spending or statewide name recognition. On August 1 Barnett secured the Republican nomination with 36% of the vote. His closest competitor was author Ken Canfield, who received 26%, followed by former state House Speaker Robin Jennison, who polled 22%..

The candidates for the Republican nomination represented a wide variety of factions within the Republican Party. Of the candidates, Barnett was neither a true moderate nor a true conservative, which may have helped with his win in the primary. Barnett's opponent in the general election was incumbent Democratic governor Kathleen Sebelius. Sebelius was first elected governor in 2002. During her time in office Sebelius has remained popular, frequently with approval ratings over 50%. Sebelius defeated Barnett on November 7, 2006, with over 58% of total votes cast.

== 2018 gubernatorial campaign ==
On June 20, 2017, Barnett announced his second candidacy for governor in 2018. In May 2018, Barnett announced that his wife Rosemary "Rosie" Hansen would be his running mate. Barnett stated that he wanted his running mate to be able to help him institute his #OneKansas agenda, help his administration improve the functionality of the State government, and help bridge the urban/rural divide, and he believes his wife, Rosie Hansen, is the most qualified to do so.

== Policy Positions ==
Jim Barnett had been considered a moderate alternative to Kris Kobach in the Republican Party primary for the 2018 election.

=== Abortion ===
Barnett opposes abortion. In 2010 while a member of the Kansas Senate, Barnett voted to override former Kansas governor Mark Parkinson's veto of an abortion bill.

=== Crosscheck Program ===
Barnett has criticized the use of the Interstate Voter Registration Crosscheck Program in Kansas, calling it a "flawed program" and a waste of time and money.

=== Economy and Taxes ===
Barnett told the Shawnee Mission Post he considers has stated that he believes former Kansas governor Sam Brownback's tax experiment "failed miserably from a budget standopoint." He thinks increasing tourism to Kansas would improve the economy.

=== Infrastructure ===
Barnett wants Kansas to go back to having a long-term plan for building and maintaining roads and highways.

=== K-12 Education ===
Barnett told the Shawnee Mission Post that if elected governor, he wants to increase education funding to $600 million stair-stepped over 3 years ($200 million each year), and that he would sign legislation to adequately fund the schools according to the courts.

=== Local Control ===
Barnett told the High Plains/Midwest AG Journal, "Ninety-five percent of economic development is local and we have to respect local communities" in reference to the proposed Tyson Foods chicken plant in Tonganoxie, Kansas that was unpopular with many local residents.

=== Medicaid Expansion ===
Barnett supports expanding Medicaid in Kansas. In June 2017, Barnett expressed concern that Congress would not allow states that have not already expanded Medicaid to do so and anticipated that repeal of the Patient Protection and Affordable Care Act would jeopardize healthcare for 440,000 Kansans.

=== Water ===
Barnett has stated "water is significant to our state's economy" and that Kansas should work on moving water west and collaborating with other states to maintain the water. He commended former Kansas governor Sam Brownback's 50-year plan to improve water quality and quantity in the state.

Party political offices
| Preceded by Tim Shallenburger | Republican nominee for Governor of Kansas; 2006 | Succeeded by Sam Brownback |
