= 2006 Kansas gubernatorial election =

- November 7, 2006
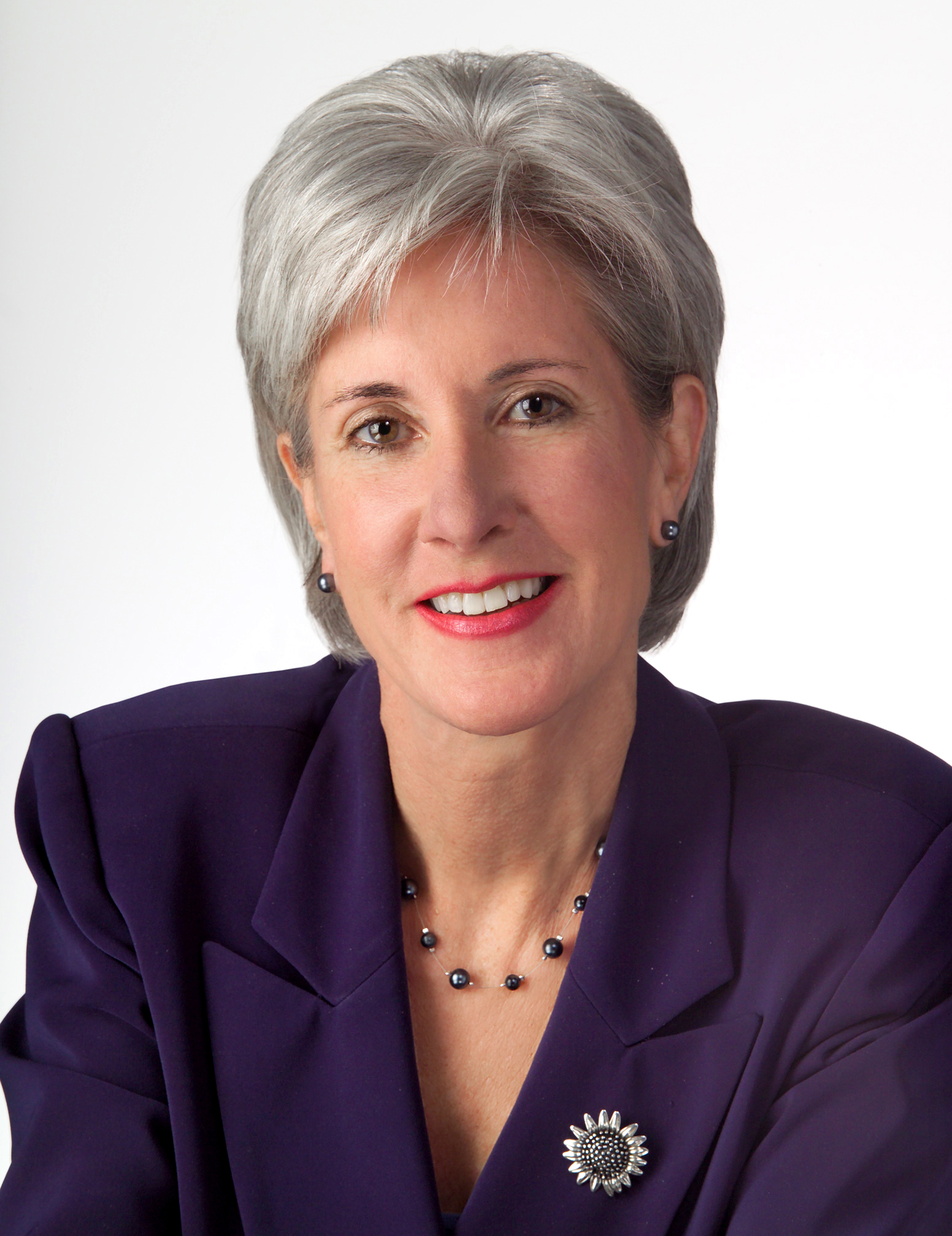

Nominee	Kathleen Sebelius	Jim Barnett
Party	Democratic	Republican
Running mate	Mark Parkinson	Susan Wagle
Popular vote	491,993	343,586
Percentage	57.90%	40.44%
- County results Sebelius: 40–50% 50–60% 60–70% 70–80% Barnett: 40–50% 50–60% 60–70%
Governor before election
Kathleen Sebelius
Democratic
Elected Governor
Kathleen Sebelius
Democratic

The 2006 Kansas gubernatorial election took place on November 7, 2006. Incumbent Democratic Governor Kathleen Sebelius, who sported high approval ratings ran for re-election to serve a second and final term. She was unopposed for the Democratic nomination and faced Republican State Senator Jim Barnett, who emerged from a crowded primary. Sebelius defeated Barnett and was re-elected with more than 57% of the vote. Barnett ran for Governor of Kansas again in 2018 and lost the Republican primary.

Until 2026, this was the last time a Democrat won over 50% of the vote in a Kansas gubernatorial election.

== Democratic primary ==
=== Candidates ===
- Kathleen Sebelius, incumbent Governor of Kansas

=== Results ===
Democratic primary results
Party	Candidate	Votes	%
Democratic	Kathleen Sebelius (incumbent)	76,046	100.00
Total votes		76,046	100.00

== Republican primary ==
Primary results by county: Barnett: Barnett—71-80%; Barnett—61-70%; Barnett—51-60%; Barnett—41-50%; Barnett—31-40%; Barnett—21-30%; Canfield: Canfield—51-60%; Canfield—41-50%; Canfield—31-40%; Canfield—21-30%; Jennison: Jennison—81-90%; Jennison—71-80%; Jennison—61-70%; Jennison—51-60%; Jennison—41-50%; Jennison—31-40%; Jennison—21-30%; Crowell: Crowell—31-40%; Tie between Barnett and Canfield-31%

=== Candidates ===
- Jim Barnett, State Senator
  - Running mate: Susan Wagle, state senator (2001–present) and former state representative (1991–2001)
- Ken R. Canfield, author and founder of the National Center for Fathering
  - Running mate: Kathe Decker, state representative (1993–present)
- Rex Crowell, former State Representative
  - Running mate: Brian Shepherd
- Dennis Hawver, Libertarian nominee for Governor in 2002
  - Running mate: Bret D. Landrith, attorney
- Robin Jennison, former Speaker of the Kansas House of Representatives
  - Running mate: Dennis Wilson, state senator (2005–present) and former state representative (1995–1999)
- Timothy V. Pickell, attorney
  - Running mate: Jeffrey McCalmon
- Richard "Rode" Rodewald, perennial candidate
  - Running mate: Helen Kanzig

Republican primary results
Party	Candidate	Votes	%
Republican	Jim Barnett	70,299	36.18
Republican	Ken R. Canfield	51,365	26.44
Republican	Robin Jennison	42,678	21.97
Republican	Timothy V. Pickell	10,473	5.39
Republican	Rex Crowell	8,677	4.47
Republican	Dennis Hawver	6,661	3.43
Republican	Richard "Rode" Rodewald	4,142	2.13
Total votes		194,295	100.00

== General election ==
=== Predictions ===
Source	Ranking	As of
The Cook Political Report	Solid D	November 6, 2006
Sabato's Crystal Ball	Likely D	November 6, 2006
Rothenberg Political Report	Safe D	November 2, 2006
Real Clear Politics	Likely D	November 6, 2006

=== Polling ===
Source	Date	Kathleen Sebelius (D)	Jim Barnett (R)
Survey USA	November 5, 2006	57%	40%
Rasmussen	October 27, 2006	56%	37%
Survey USA	October 16, 2006	55%	42%
Survey USA	September 14, 2006	58%	38%
Rasmussen	September 1, 2006	48%	37%
Rasmussen	July 31, 2006	51%	34%
Rasmussen	June 19, 2006	49%	36%
Rasmussen	May 3, 2006	49%	37%
Rasmussen	April 15, 2006	50%	37%
Rasmussen	February 13, 2006	45%	37%
Rasmussen	January 25, 2006	46%	35%

=== Results ===
Kansas gubernatorial election, 2006
Party	Candidate	Votes	%	±%
Democratic	Kathleen Sebelius (incumbent)	491,993	57.90%	+5.03%
Republican	Jim Barnett	343,586	40.44%	−4.66%
Libertarian	Carl Kramer	8,896	1.05%	+0.08%
Reform	Richard Lee Ranzau	5,221	0.61%	−0.45%
Write-in		4	0.00%	
Majority		148,407	17.47%	+9.68%
Turnout		849,700		
Democratic hold		Swing		

==== Counties that flipped from Republican to Democratic ====
- Sherman (largest municipality: Goodland)
- Lane (largest municipality: Dighton)
- Stafford (largest municipality: St. John)
- Mitchell (largest municipality: Beloit)
- Lincoln (largest municipality: Lincoln) (previously tied)
- Kingman (largest municipality: Kingman)
- Ottawa (largest municipality: Minneapolis) (previously tied)
- Doniphan (Largest city: Wathena)
- Linn (Largest city: Pleasanton)
- Woodson (Largest city: Yates Center)
- Wilson (Largest city: Neodesha)
- Bourbon (Largest city: Fort Scott)
- Cherokee (Largest city: Baxter Springs)
- McPherson (largest municipality: McPherson)
- Johnson (largest municipality: Overland Park)

==== Counties that flipped from Democratic to Republican ====
- Coffey (largest municipality: Burlington)
- Chase (largest city: Cottonwood Falls)
- Greenwood (largest municipality: Eureka)
- Norton (largest municipality: Norton)
- Pratt (largest municipality: Pratt)
- Pottawatomie (largest municipality: Manhattan)

== See also ==
- U.S. gubernatorial elections, 2006
- List of governors of Kansas
