= Charles E. Johnson (government official) =

American government official (1936–2024)

Charles Edwin Johnson
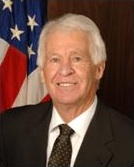

United States Secretary of Health and Human Services Acting
- In office January 20, 2009 – April 28, 2009
- President: Barack Obama
- Preceded by: Mike Leavitt
- Succeeded by: Kathleen Sebelius

Personal details
- Born: June 15, 1936 Salt Lake City, Utah, U.S.
- Died: January 7, 2024 (aged 87) Salt Lake City, Utah, U.S.
- Spouse: Susanna Brown Johnson

Charles Edwin Johnson (June 15, 1936 – January 7, 2024) was an American civil servant. He had served as Acting United States Secretary of Health and Human Services from January to April 2009 during the Obama presidency. Johnson was appointed by then President George W. Bush in 2005 as Assistant Secretary for Budget, Technology, and Finance. He was a public accountant for 31 years prior to joining the department. Johnson died from blood cancer on January 7, 2024, at the age of 87.

Political offices
Preceded by Mike Leavitt	United States Secretary of Health and Human Services; Acting; 2009	Succeeded by Kathleen Sebelius
