= John E. Moore (politician) =

American politician (born 1943)

46th Lieutenant Governor of Kansas
- In office January 13, 2003 – January 20, 2007
- Governor: Kathleen Sebelius
- Preceded by: Gary Sherrer
- Succeeded by: Mark Parkinson

Personal details
- Born: July 13, 1943 (age 82) Charleston, West Virginia, U.S.
- Party: Republican turned Democratic

John E. Moore (born July 13, 1943) is an American politician. In 2002 he was elected on the Democratic Party ticket as the running mate of Governor Kathleen Sebelius; he assumed office as the 46th Lieutenant Governor of Kansas on January 13, 2003. In 2006, Moore chose not to seek re-election.

== Lieutenant governor ==
In addition to his responsibilities as lieutenant governor, Moore also served as chairman of the Governor’s Strategic Military Planning Commission. The commission was created to preserve and grow the military presence in Kansas during the 2005 Base Realignment and Closure Commission process. He also served as chairman of the Kansas Health Care Cost Containment Commission which focuses upon reducing the cost of health care administration in Kansas.

Moore was also the Kansas Secretary of Commerce until September 1, 2004, before stepping down to become the state’s first full-time lieutenant governor. As secretary of commerce, he headed the Prosperity Summit process to develop the Economic Revitalization Act and the Economic Growth Act which were enacted into law in 2004. The 2004 legislative session has been called by many the most important session for economic development in decades.

== Business career and community involvement ==
Prior to seeking public office, Moore had been employed by the Cessna Aircraft Company since 1982. Beginning as senior vice president of human resources, he was named one of two executive vice presidents of the company in 1999. He resigned in July 2002 in order to run for office. He had been a Republican for most of his life, but became a Democrat just days before being introduced on the Sebelius ticket.

Moore is past chairman of the Kansas Chamber of Commerce and Industry. He is also a past chairman of both Kansas, Inc. and Kansas Technology Enterprise Corporation (KTEC), two public/private partnerships focused on economic development. He also served as the first chairman of the Kansas Children’s Cabinet.

Moore has been active in philanthropic and civic activities in the Wichita area. He is a founder and former chairman of the Kansas Foodbank, and he was the founder and the first chairman of the Greater Wichita Area Sports Commission. In 1998, he served as the general campaign chairman for the United Way of the Plains. He also served as a board member and president of the Wichita Children’s Home.

== Early life and education ==
Moore was born in Charleston, West Virginia. Moore received his undergraduate degree from Washington and Lee University in Lexington, Virginia, and his Juris Doctor degree from the University of Kentucky’s College of Law in 1968. He married in 1966 to Marty Spangenberg and has two children—comic book writer B. Clay Moore of Shawnee, Kansas and Stacia Wohlford of Lawrence, Kansas—and five grandchildren.

Party political offices
Preceded by Elizabeth Baker	Democratic nominee for Lieutenant Governor of Kansas; 2002	Succeeded by Mark Parkinson
Political offices
Preceded by Gary Sherrer	Lieutenant Governor of Kansas; 2003–2007	Succeeded by Mark Parkinson
