= Dennis Jones (Kansas politician) =

American politician

62nd Chairman of the Kansas Republican Party
- In office January 2003 – January 2005
- Preceded by: Mark Parkinson
- Succeeded by: Tim Shallenburger

Personal details
- Education: Washburn University; Washburn University School of Law J.D.
- Occupation: Lawyer

Dennis Jones is an American lawyer and politician from Lakin, Kansas who served as the 62nd Kansas Republican Party Chairman. Prior to his political career he worked as an attorney.

== Early life ==
Jones received a bachelor's degree at Washburn University and a J.D. from Washburn University School of Law in 1999. He worked as a lobbyist for the National Right to Work Legal Defense Foundation in Springfield, Virginia in 1994. He was appointed the Kansas Assistant Attorney General in the Civil Litigation Division in 2000.

== Political career ==
=== Kansas Republican Chairman ===
Jones was elected Chairman of the Kansas Republican Party in January 2003 which saw a sweeping victory for the moderate wing of the state party. As chairman Jones attempted to open statewide Republican primaries to Independent voters. This move would be struck down by district judge Charles Andrews who informed secretary of state Ron Thornburgh not to allow independents to vote in the primary. During his time as chairman, Jones also served as the Bush 2004 campaign manager for the state of Kansas. As chairman, Jones also came out in opposition to the Pro-life movement stating that the group Kansans for Life, and their agenda, had no place in the Kansas Republican Party.

=== Post Chairman ===
Following his departure as Chairman of the Kansas Republican Party, Jones has remained active in state politics as a co-founder of the Traditional Republicans for Common Sense, a group formed in the wake of the 2012 Kansas elections which saw conservative Republicans outnumber moderate Republicans in the Kansas Senate. The group has dedicated itself to being a moderating voice in the state's Republican movement which, they claim, has taken "a dangerous, hard-right turn." The group opposed incumbent governor Sam Brownback's campaign for reelection in the 2014 Kansas gubernatorial election. However, they failed to field a moderate candidate in time for the primaries and Brownback easily won the nomination and went on to defeat his Democratic opponent Paul Davis. The group supported funding of schools, elimination of the income tax, and creating a merit based judicial system.

Party political offices
Preceded by Mark Parkinson	Chairman of the Kansas Republican Party; 2003–2005	Succeeded by Tim Shallenburger
