= Tim Shallenburger =

American politician (born 1954)

Vice President of the Kansas Senate
- Incumbent
- Assumed office January 10, 2025
- Preceded by: Rick Wilborn

Member of the Kansas Senate from the 13th district
- Incumbent
- Assumed office January 24, 2023
- Preceded by: Richard Hilderbrand

Chair of the Kansas Republican Party
- In office January 2005 – January 2007
- Preceded by: Dennis Jones
- Succeeded by: Kris Kobach

36th Treasurer of Kansas
- In office January 12, 1999 – January 13, 2003
- Governor: Bill Graves
- Preceded by: Clyde Graeber
- Succeeded by: Lynn Jenkins

Speaker of the Kansas House of Representatives
- In office 1995 – January 11, 1999
- Preceded by: Robert Miller
- Succeeded by: Robin Jennison

Member of the Kansas House of Representatives from the 1st district
- In office January 12, 1987 – January 11, 1999
- Preceded by: Pat Weaver
- Succeeded by: Doug Gatewood

Personal details
- Born: March 14, 1954 (age 72) Joplin, Missouri, U.S.
- Party: Republican
- Education: Pittsburg State University (attended); Coffeyville Community College (attended)

Tim Shallenburger (born March 14, 1954) is an American politician serving as a member of the Kansas Senate, representing the 13th District since 2023. He previously served as Speaker of the Kansas House of Representatives and later as Kansas State Treasurer.

== Biography ==
Shallenburger was born in Joplin, Missouri, and raised in Baxter Springs, Kansas. He attended Pittsburg State University and Coffeyville Community College. He then worked as a banker.

== Career ==
Shallenburger was a member of the House of Representatives from 1987 to 1998, serving as Speaker from 1995 to 1998. He was then Treasurer from 1999 to 2003, at which time he was succeeded by Lynn Jenkins, who later became a member of the United States House of Representatives. In 2002, Shallenburger ran for Governor of Kansas, losing to Democrat Kathleen Sebelius, who later became United States Secretary of Health and Human Services. He served as the Legislative Director for the Office of Governor Sam Brownback.

In January 2023 Shallenberger was appointed to the Kansas Senate to succeed retiring senator Richard Hilderbrand.

Party political offices
Preceded by Randy Duncan	Republican nominee for Treasurer of Kansas; 1998	Succeeded by Lynn Jenkins
Preceded by Bill Graves	Republican nominee for Governor of Kansas; 2002	Succeeded by Jim Barnett
Preceded by Dennis Jones	Chair of the Kansas Republican Party; 2005–2007	Succeeded by Kris Kobach
Political offices
Preceded by Clyde Graeber	Treasurer of Kansas; 1999–2003	Succeeded by Lynn Jenkins
Kansas Senate
Preceded by Rick Wilborn	Vice President of the Kansas Senate; 2025–present	Incumbent
