= Mike Argabright =

American politician

Michael D. Argabright

Member of the Kansas Senate from the 17th district
- Incumbent
- Assumed office January 13, 2025
- Preceded by: Jeff Longbine

Personal details
- Born: July 1963 (age 63) Atwood, Kansas, U.S.
- Party: Republican
- Spouse: Carla
- Children: 3

Michael D. Argabright (born July 1963) is an American politician, farmer, and educator serving as a member of the Kansas Senate for the 17th Senate district.

== Early life and education ==
Argabright was born in July 7th 1963 in Atwood, Kansas, and grew up on his family's farm. He attended Wichita State University, earning a Bachelor of Arts in Physical Education in 1988, a Master's degree in Sport and Fitness Administration/Management in 1994, and a Doctor of Education (Ed.D.) in Educational Leadership and Administration in 2014. He also completed administrative licensure coursework at Emporia State University.

== Career in education ==
Argabright spent 35 years in education. His career included work as a teacher, football coach, and in various administrative roles. He served as superintendent for Eureka USD 389 and later led Southern Lyon County USD 252 from 2006 until his retirement in 2023. During his tenure, Argabright served as president of the Kansas Schools Superintendents' Association and held roles with organizations such as United School Administrators of Kansas and the American Association of School Administrators.

== Career in politics ==
In November 2024, Argabright was elected as a Republican to the Kansas Senate representing the 17th District, with his term commencing in January 2025. In the Senate, Argabright has been assigned to committees focusing on education, insurance, the judiciary, transportation, and veterans affairs.

Argabright has stated that he supports Medicaid expansion in Kansas, a policy that is opposed by the Kansas Republican leadership.

== Personal life ==
Argabright is married to Carla, a teacher, and they have three adult sons, Bradley, Mitchell and Jacob. He operates a farm, raising Charolais cattle, and is a member of organizations such as the Kansas Livestock Association and Kansas Farm Bureau. Argabright is Catholic and attends a local Catholic church.
