= 2002 Kansas gubernatorial election =

- November 5, 2002
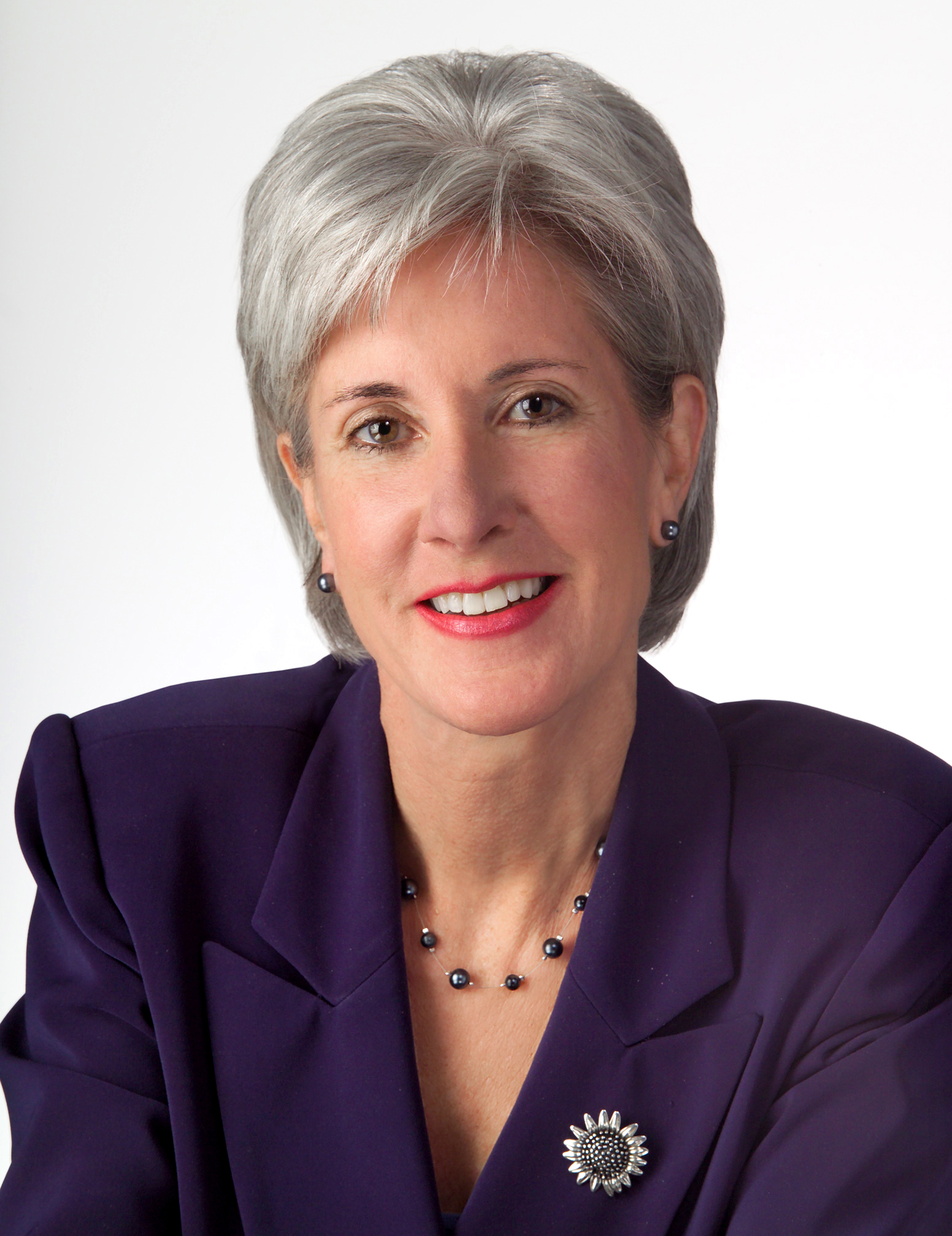

Nominee	Kathleen Sebelius	Tim Shallenburger
Party	Democratic	Republican
Running mate	John E. Moore	Dave Lindstrom
Popular vote	441,858	376,830
Percentage	52.87%	45.09%
- County results Sebelius: 40–50% 50–60% 60–70% 70–80% Shallenburger: 40–50% 50–60% 60–70% Tie: 40–50%
Governor before election
Bill Graves
Republican
Elected Governor
Kathleen Sebelius
Democratic

The 2002 Kansas gubernatorial election was held on November 5, 2002. Incumbent Governor Bill Graves, a Republican, was barred from seeking a third term by the Kansas Constitution. Kansas Insurance Commissioner Kathleen Sebelius, the Democratic nominee, ran against Kansas State Treasurer Tim Shallenburger, the Republican nominee, with Sebelius defeating Shallenburger to become the second female Governor of Kansas after Joan Finney who served as governor from 1991 to 1995.

== Democratic primary ==
=== Candidates ===
- Kathleen Sebelius, Kansas Insurance Commissioner

=== Results ===
Democratic primary results
Party	Candidate	Votes	%
Democratic	Kathleen Sebelius	87,499	100.00
Total votes		87,499	100.00

== Republican primary ==
Primary results by county: Shallenburger: Shallenburger—71-80%; Shallenburger—51-60%; Shallenburger—41-50%; Shallenburger—31-40%; Kerr: Kerr—41-50%; Kerr—31-40%; Knight: Knight—51-60%; Knight—41-50%; Knight—31-40%; Tie between Shallenburger and Kerr-38%

=== Candidates ===
- Tim Shallenburger, Kansas State Treasurer (1999–present) and former state representative (1987–1998)
  - Running mate: Dave Lindstrom, former Kansas City Chiefs defensive end and businessman
- Dave Kerr, Kansas State Senator
  - Running mate: Mary Birch, former president of the Overland Park Chamber of Commerce (1984–2002)
- Bob Knight, Mayor of Wichita, Kansas
  - Running mate: Kent Glasscock, Speaker of the Kansas House of Representatives (2001–2003) and state representative (1991–2003), was Carla Stovall's running mate until she dropped out.
- Dan Bloom, real estate developer and former Superintendent of the Eudora school district
  - Running mate: Eric Bloom, architectural engineering student

=== Withdrawn ===
- Carla Stovall, Kansas Attorney General (1995–2003).
  - Running mate: Kent Glasscock, Speaker of the Kansas House of Representatives (2001–2003) and state representative (1991–2003)

Initially, Stovall was one of the presumed "front-runner" candidates, and her anticipated run against the probable Democratic nominee, Kansas Insurance Commissioner Kathleen Sebelius, drew national attention as becoming possibly a rare "woman-vs.-woman" gubernatorial race. Though the front-runner among moderate candidates — and confident that she would win if she stayed in the race — Stovall dropped out in April, 2002, citing a lack of enthusiasm for campaigning, and for the job of governor, and announced plans to marry Kansas media mogul Larry Steckline, whom she married in August.

Stovall's abrupt withdrawal threw the moderate wing of the Kansas Republican Party into chaos, as they scrambled to replace her. Kent Glasscock, her running mate, was the heir-apparent, and claimed entitlement to Stovall's campaign funds, but conservative opponent Tim Shallenberger, the incumbent State Treasurer, argued that the funds, per his interpretation of state law, had to be returned to the state Republican party, or to the donors, a charity, or the state government's general revenue fund. Additional Republican candidates began to emerge, also, further complicating the race. Glasscock ultimately became a running mate for gubernatorial candidate Bob Knight.

Stovall's withdrawal was credited with giving advantage to the Democratic nominee (and ultimate victor), Katheleen Sebelius.

=== Results ===
Republican primary results
Party	Candidate	Votes	%
Republican	Tim Shallenburger	122,141	41.47
Republican	Dave Kerr	86,995	29.54
Republican	Bob Knight	77,642	26.36
Republican	Dan Bloom	7,726	2.62
Total votes		294,504	100.00

== General election ==
=== Predictions ===
Source	Ranking	As of
The Cook Political Report	Lean D (flip)	October 31, 2002
Sabato's Crystal Ball	Lean D (flip)	November 4, 2002

=== Polling ===
Poll source	Date(s) administered	Sample size (Note: Key: A – all adults RV – registered voters LV – likely voters V – unclear)	Margin of error	Kathleen Sebelius (D)	Tim Shallenburger (R)	Dennis Hawver (L)	Theodore Pettibone (Reform)	Other / undecided
SurveyUSA	October 31 – November 2, 2002	704 (LV)	± 3.8%	51%	44%	2%	1%	2%

=== Results ===
Kansas gubernatorial election, 2002
Party	Candidate	Votes	%	±%
Democratic	Kathleen Sebelius	441,858	52.87%	+30.22%
Republican	Tim Shallenburger	376,830	45.09%	−28.28%
Reform	Theodore Pettibone	8,907	1.07%	+0.01%
Libertarian	Dennis Hawver	8,097	0.97%	
Majority		65,028	7.78%	−42.93%
Turnout		835,692		
Democratic gain from Republican		Swing		

==== Counties that flipped from Republican to Democratic ====
- Jefferson (largest municipality: Valley Falls)
- Crawford (largest city: Pittsburg)
- Riley (largest municipality: Manhattan)
- Shawnee (largest municipality: Topeka)
- Lyon (largest municipality: Emporia)
- Sherman (largest municipality: Goodland)
- Decatur (largest municipality: Oberlin)
- Sheridan (largest municipality: Hoxie)
- Graham (largest municipality: Hill City)
- Lane (largest municipality: Dighton)
- Trego (largest municipality: WaKeeney)
- Ford (largest municipality: Dodge City)
- Smith (largest municipality: Smith Center)
- Phillips (largest municipality: Phillipsburg)
- Rooks (largest municipality: Plainville)
- Osborne (largest municipality: Osborne)
- Russell (largest municipality: Russell)
- Ellis (largest municipality: Hays)
- Rush (largest municipality: La Crosse)
- Barton (largest municipality: Great Bend)
- Pawnee (largest municipality: Larned)
- Stafford (largest municipality: St. John)
- Edwards (largest municipality: Kinsley)
- Kiowa (largest municipality: Greensburg)
- Mitchell (largest municipality: Beloit)
- Lincoln (largest municipality: Lincoln) (became tied)
- Ellsworth (largest municipality: Ellsworth)
- Rice (largest municipality: Lyons)
- Reno (largest municipality: Hutchinson)
- Kingman (largest municipality: Kingman)
- Harvey (largest municipality: Newton)
- Harper (largest municipality: Anthony)
- Sumner (largest municipality: Wellington)
- McPherson (largest municipality: McPherson)
- Saline (largest municipality: Salina)
- Ottawa (largest municipality: Minneapolis) (became tied)
- Cloud (largest municipality: Concordia)
- Clay (largest municipality: Clay Center)
- Geary (Largest city: Junction City)
- Dickinson (Largest city: Abilene)
- Morris (Largest city: Council Grove)
- Marshall (Largest city: Marysville)
- Nemaha (Largest city: Sabetha)
- Brown (Largest city: Hiawatha)
- Doniphan (Largest city: Wathena)
- Atchison (Largest city: Atchison)
- Leavenworth (Largest city: Leavenworth)
- Jackson (Largest city: Holton)
- Osage (Largest city: Osage City)
- Franklin (Largest city: Ottawa)
- Miami (Largest city: Spring Hill)
- Anderson (Largest city: Garnett)
- Linn (Largest city: Pleasanton)
- Woodson (Largest city: Yates Center)
- Wilson (Largest city: Neodesha)
- Allen (Largest city: Iola)
- Bourbon (Largest city: Fort Scott)
- Neosho (Largest city: Chanute)
- Labette (Largest city: Parsons)
- Cherokee (Largest city: Baxter Springs)
- Johnson (largest municipality: Overland Park)
- Coffey (largest municipality: Burlington)
- Chase (largest city: Cottonwood Falls)
- Greenwood (largest municipality: Eureka)
- Norton (largest municipality: Norton)
- Pratt (largest municipality: Pratt)
- Pottawatomie (largest municipality: Manhattan)
- Douglas (Largest city: Lawrence)
- Wyandotte (Largest city: Kansas City)
