= Kathleen Sebelius =

American politician (born 1948)

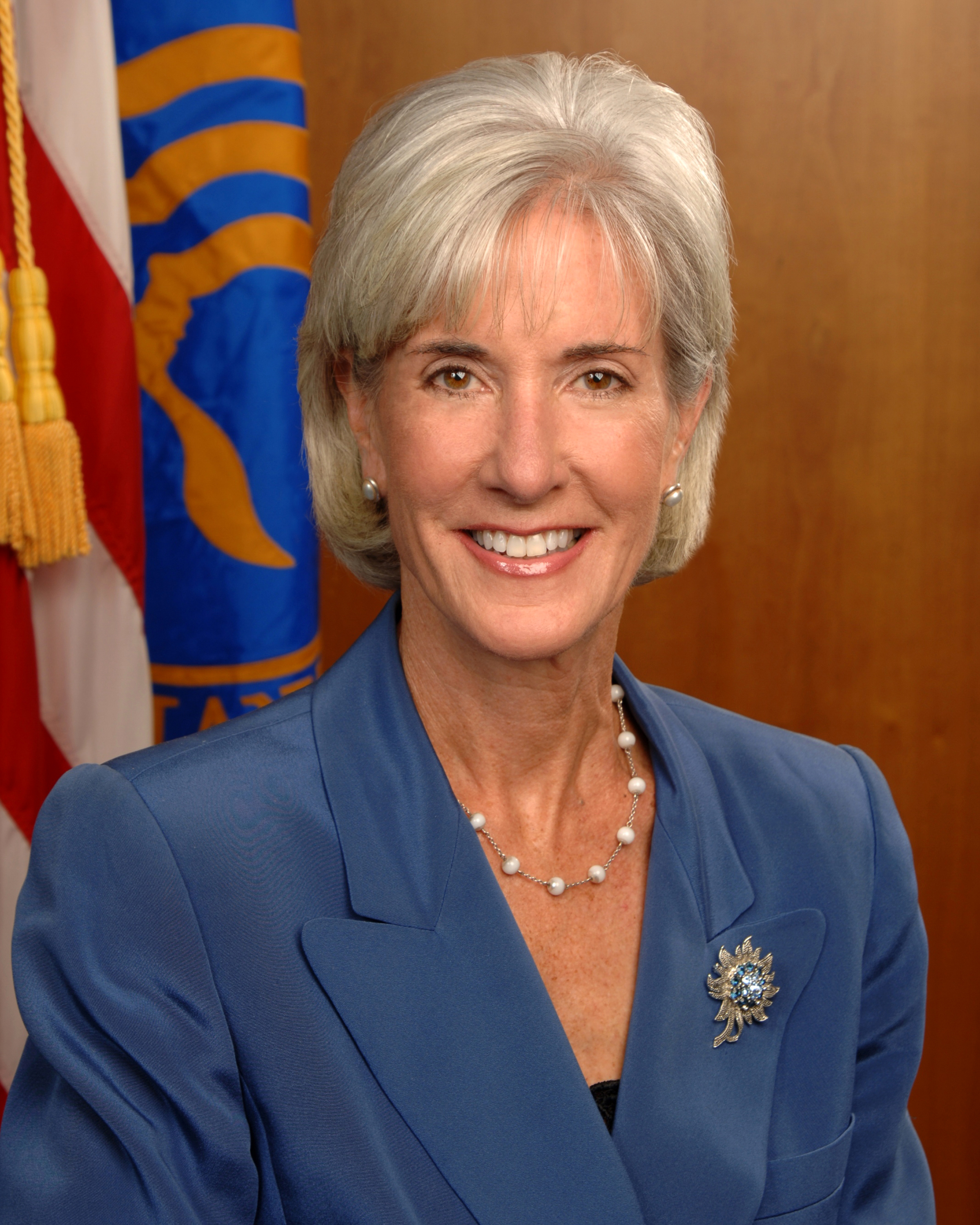
- Official portrait, 2009

21st United States Secretary of Health and Human Services
- In office April 28, 2009 – June 9, 2014
- President: Barack Obama
- Deputy: Bill Corr
- Preceded by: Charles E. Johnson
- Succeeded by: Sylvia Mathews Burwell

44th Governor of Kansas
- In office January 13, 2003 – April 28, 2009
- Lieutenant: John E. Moore; Mark Parkinson
- Preceded by: Bill Graves
- Succeeded by: Mark Parkinson

23rd Insurance Commissioner of Kansas
- In office January 9, 1995 – January 13, 2003
- Governor: Bill Graves
- Preceded by: Ronald L. Todd
- Succeeded by: Sandy Praeger

Member of the Kansas House of Representatives from the 56th district
- In office January 1987 – January 1995
- Preceded by: Judith Runnels
- Succeeded by: Nancy Kirk

Personal details
- Born: Kathleen Gilligan; May 15, 1948 (age 78) Cincinnati, Ohio, U.S.
- Party: Democratic
- Spouse: K. Gary Sebelius (m. 1974)
- Children: 2
- Parent: John J. Gilligan (father)
- Relatives: Keith Sebelius (father-in-law)
- Education: Trinity Washington University (BA); University of Kansas (MPA)
- Sebelius's voice Sebelius at a Senate Appropriations subcommittee hearing on the FY2010 HHS budget. Recorded June 9, 2009

Kathleen Sebelius (/sɪˈbiːliəs/; née Gilligan, born May 15, 1948) is an American politician who served as the 21st United States secretary of health and human services from 2009 until 2014. As Secretary of Health and Human Services, Sebelius was instrumental in overseeing the implementation of the Affordable Care Act. Before becoming secretary, she served as the 44th governor of Kansas from 2003 to 2009, the second woman to hold that office. She is a member of the Democratic Party. Sebelius was the Democratic respondent to the 2008 State of the Union address and is chair-emerita of the Democratic Governors Association (she was its first female chair). She is CEO of Sebelius Resources LLC.

== Early life and education ==
Sebelius was born and raised in Cincinnati, Ohio, the daughter of Mary Kathryn (née Dixon) and John J. Gilligan. Sebelius was the second oldest of four children in her family. Her family ran funeral homes and her father was a city councilor in Cincinnati. Jack Gilligan ran for Congress near the end of Sebelius's time in high school and served one term in Congress. Her father was elected governor of Ohio when Sebelius was 21 years old. Sebelius worked in her father's campaign traveling around the state. Her family was Catholic and has Irish ancestry.

She attended the Summit Country Day School in Cincinnati and graduated from Trinity Washington University in Washington, D.C., with a Bachelor of Arts in political science. She later earned a Master of Public Administration degree from the University of Kansas. She moved to Kansas in 1974.

== Early career ==
Sebelius served as executive director and chief lobbyist for the Kansas Trial Lawyers Association from 1977 to 1986.

== Kansas House of Representatives (1987–1995) ==
Sebelius was first elected to the Kansas House of Representatives in 1986. She won re-election in 1988, 1990, and 1992. She represented Topeka, Kansas.

=== Tenure ===
In the 1988 presidential election, she endorsed Gary Hart.

In 1991, she ran to become House Majority Leader but lost to State Representative Tom Sawyer of Wichita.

She is strongly pro-choice.

=== Committee assignments ===
- Federal and State Affairs Committee (Chair)

== Kansas Insurance Commissioner (1995–2003) ==
In 1994, Sebelius left the state House of Representatives to run for state Insurance Commissioner and stunned political forecasters by winning – the first time a Democrat had won the position in over a century.

She refused to take campaign contributions from the insurance industry and blocked the proposed merger of Blue Cross Blue Shield of Kansas, the state's largest health insurer, with an Indiana-based company. Sebelius's decision marked the first time the corporation had been rebuffed in its acquisition attempts.

When Sebelius became commissioner in 1995, the Insurance Department had an annual budget of $11.7 million. By 2002, the budget had been cut to $10 million. Among the cuts was spending on contracted services after Sebelius fired two contracted lawyers after an audit discovered they had overbilled the state.

In 2001 Sebelius was named as one of Governing Magazine's Public Officials of the Year while she was serving as Kansas Insurance Commissioner.

== Governor of Kansas (2003–2009) ==
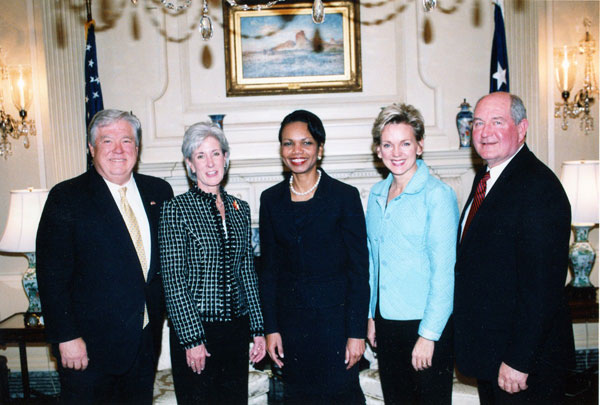
Kathleen Sebelius (second from left) with Mississippi Governor Haley Barbour (first left), United States Secretary of State Condoleezza Rice (center), Michigan Governor Jennifer Granholm (fourth), and Georgia Governor Sonny Perdue (right)

=== 2002 election ===
In the general election, Sebelius's platform included promises to protect school budgets from budget cuts, not to raise taxes, and to completely review and overhaul the state government. Sebelius raised $4 million for the campaign, a Kansas state fundraising record. Sebelius defeated Republican Kansas State Treasurer Tim Shallenburger 53%–45%. Sebelius's election made her and her father the first father/daughter governor duo in the United States.

=== First term (2003–2007) ===
Throughout her first term, Sebelius built upon her popularity and in January 2006 was tied for 20th most popular governor in the country.

During the 2004 election, CNN speculated Sebelius could be a potential running mate for John Kerry.

In November 2005, Time named Sebelius as one of the five best governors in America, praising her for eliminating a $1.1 billion debt she inherited, ferreting out waste in state government, and strongly supporting public education – all without raising taxes, although she proposed raising sales, property, and income taxes. The article also praised her bipartisan approach to governing, a useful trait in a state where Republicans have usually controlled the Legislature.

In February 2006, the White House Project named Sebelius one of its "8 in '08", a group of eight female politicians who could possibly run and be elected president in 2008. She was also cited by The New York Times to be among the women most likely to become the first female President of the United States.

In October 2006, the Cato Institute gave Sebelius the grade of "D" on their biennial fiscal policy report card, which measures the fiscal performance of U.S. governors based on spending and taxes. Her grade was influenced by the combination of proposed tax increases and expanded spending growth beyond population plus inflation.

=== 2006 re-election ===
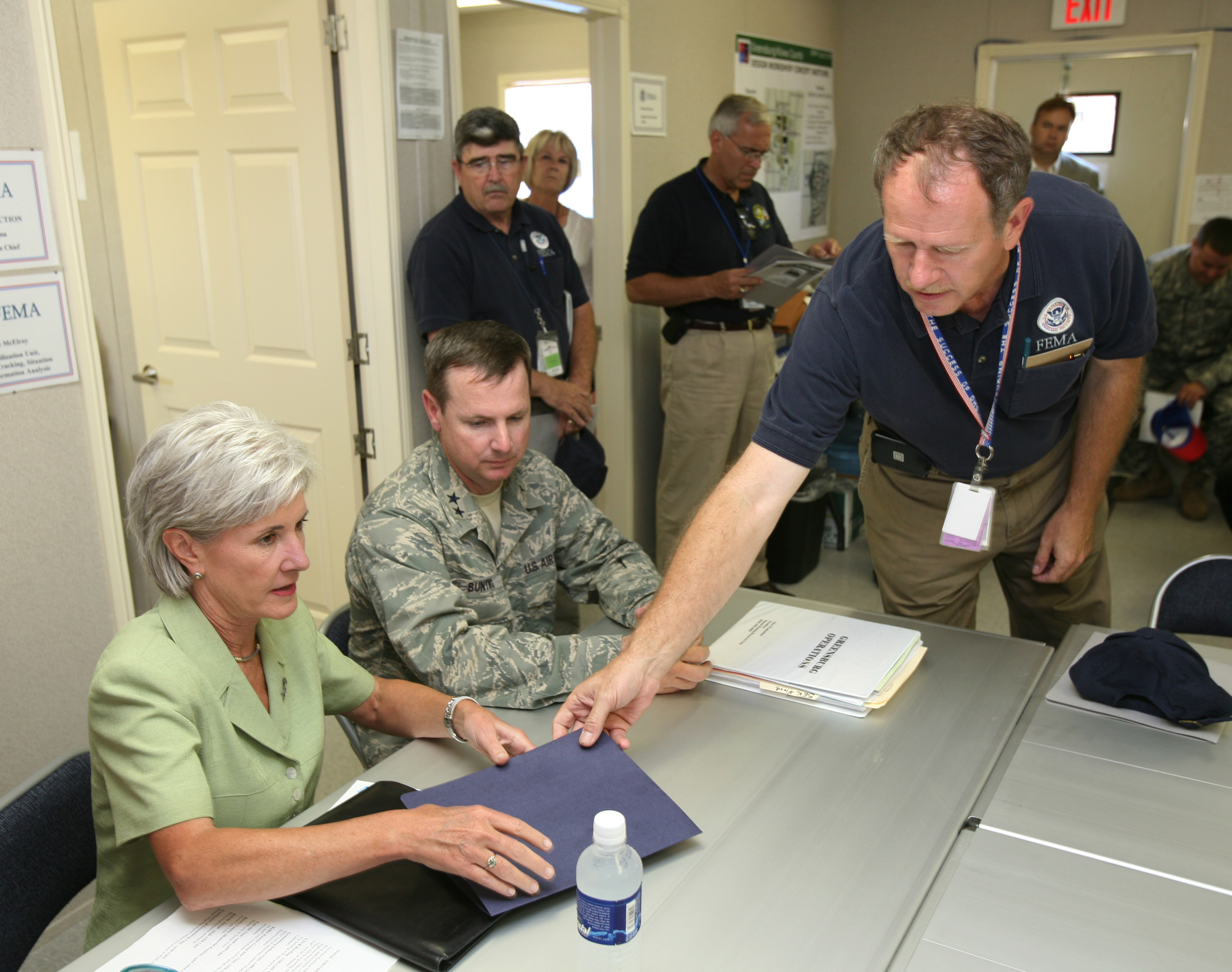
Sebelius meets with FEMA workers in Kansas.

On May 26, 2006, Sebelius formally announced her candidacy for re-election. Four days later, Mark Parkinson, former chair of the Kansas Republican Party, switched his party affiliation to Democrat; the following day Sebelius announced that Parkinson would be her running mate for lieutenant governor. Parkinson had previously served in the state House during 1991 and 1992 and the Senate from 1993 to 1997. Parkinson was viewed as a pro-business moderate who strongly supported public education. This was somewhat reminiscent of the fact that John Moore had also been a Republican, before switching just days before joining Sebelius as her running mate.

She was challenged by Republican Kansas State Senator Jim Barnett. A September 1 Rasmussen poll showed Sebelius with an 11% lead over Barnett. Other polls gave Sebelius as much as a 20% lead. As of 2004, 50% of Kansas voters were registered Republicans, compared to 27% as registered Democrats. Sebelius nevertheless won re-election, defeating Barnett 57%–41%. Because of Kansas's term limits law, her second term as Governor was her last.

=== Second term (2007–2009) ===
In February 2008, during Sebelius's second term in office, there was a report in the Wichita Eagle that the State of Kansas was suspending tax refunds and that, because of a lack of tax revenue, might not be able to meet payroll for state employees. Sebelius called for issuing certificates of indebtedness, moving funds from various state agency accounts into the general fund to alleviate the crisis. However, Republican leaders in the legislature did not agree with her certificate of indebtedness plan, saying the state would be unable to repay the certificates unless Sebelius issued allotments or signed a budget rescission bill that had been passed by the legislature but had not yet been delivered to her desk. The standoff ended when the budget arrived, and Sebelius agreed to sign it, although she line-item vetoed several cuts she felt were too large. The rescission bill reduced the budget by about $300 million. $7 million of the cuts came in the form of reduced educational funding.

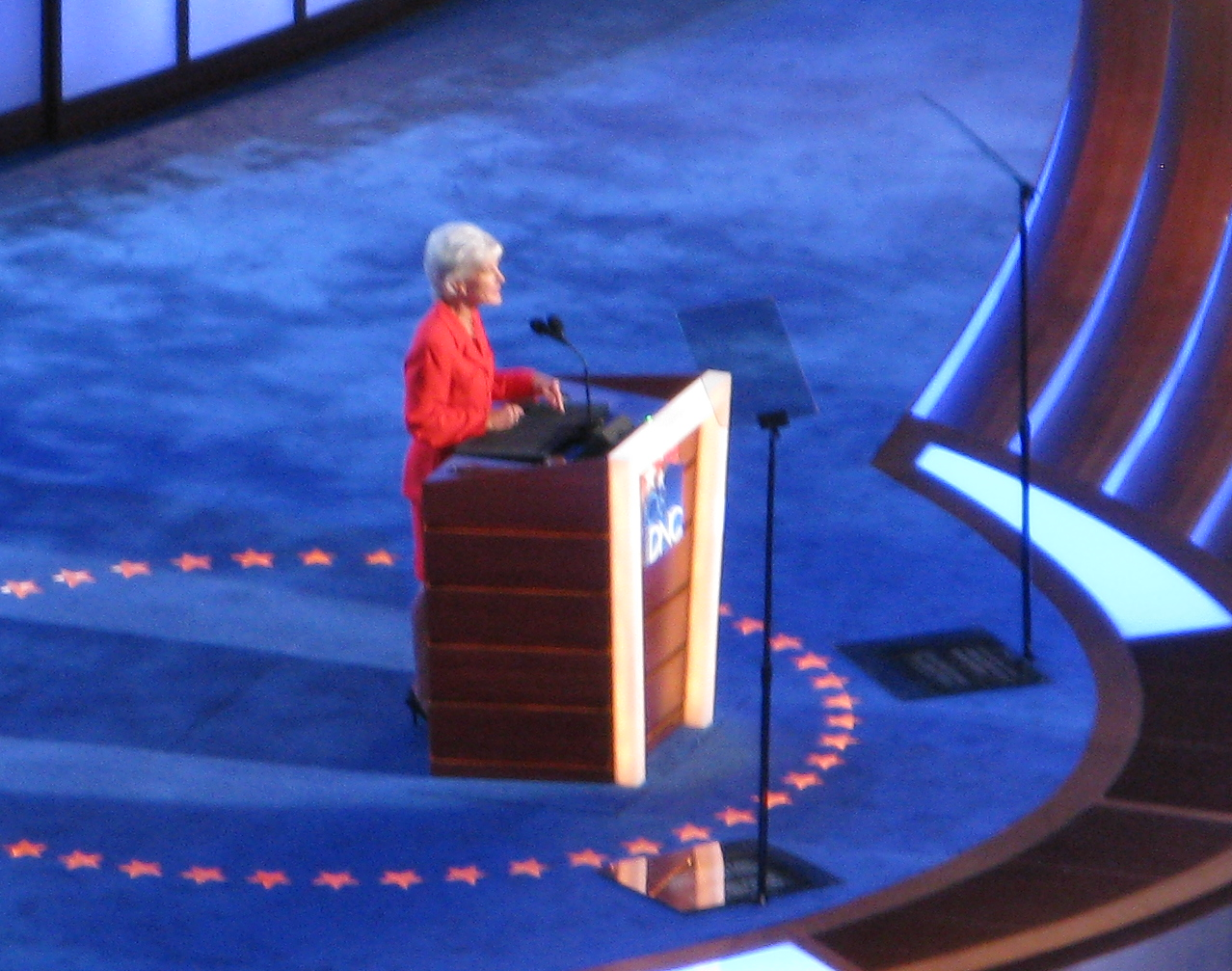
Sebelius speaks during the second day of the 2008 Democratic National Convention in Denver, Colorado.

After Barack Obama won the Democratic nomination for President in June 2008, speculation that Sebelius would be a contender for the vice presidential slot on the Democratic ticket continued. The Washington Post listed her as the top prospect for the 2008 nomination. James Carville and Bob Novak also mentioned Sebelius's name, and Wesley Clark, also considered a potential running mate, publicly endorsed Sebelius, referring to her as "the next vice-president of the United States". Speculation that the vice presidential nomination lay in her future was heightened by the fact that she was chosen by the Democratic Party's congressional leaders to give their party's official response to Republican president George W. Bush's 2008 State of the Union Address. The next day, she endorsed Obama's campaign, one week before the Kansas caucus on Super Tuesday. Obama won the caucus easily, with 74% support.

Speculation on her vice presidential selection intensified when a report from political ad agency insider, Tribble Ad Agency, reported on its website that the Obama Campaign owned the domain name "ObamaSebelius.com" through the GoDaddy.com registration service. However, just after midnight on August 23, it was reported by the Associated Press that Obama ultimately selected Joe Biden, the senior senator from Delaware, as his running mate.

Sebelius is a former chair of the Democratic Governors Association. She was the first female chair of the association (elected as such in 2006).

== U.S. Secretary of Health and Human Services (2009–2014) ==
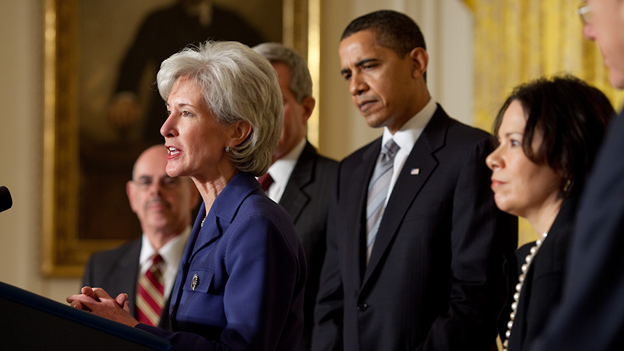
Sebelius accepting her nomination by President Barack Obama as Secretary of Health and Human Services

=== Nomination ===
Sebelius was an early supporter of Barack Obama's presidential campaign, having endorsed him in January 2008. After he was elected the President of the United States, Sebelius' early support for Obama and her ability to govern as a Democrat in a heavily Republican state made Sebelius look like a likely nominee for Obama's Cabinet. Sebelius asked to be removed from consideration on December 6, 2008. Following Bill Richardson's withdrawal as Obama's nomination for Secretary of Commerce, there was media speculation that Sebelius would be chosen as the new nominee. Through a spokesperson, Sebelius reiterated her earlier statement that she would not consider accepting a nomination to the Cabinet position.

On February 28, 2009, it was reported that Sebelius had accepted Obama's nomination for the position of Secretary of Health and Human Services. On March 2, 2009, Obama officially announced Governor Sebelius as his nominee. At Obama's announcement, Sebelius was accompanied by two Kansas Republicans, former U.S. Senator Bob Dole and incumbent Senator Pat Roberts.

Sebelius was Obama's second choice for Secretary of Health and Human Services. Obama's first pick, former Senator Tom Daschle, withdrew from consideration on February 3 after it was revealed he had over $140,000 in tax errors. In a March 2009 letter to the Senate Finance Committee, Sebelius admitted to "unintentional errors" in tax returns and paid nearly $8,000 in back taxes to rectify the errors. A letter to Sebelius from Senate Finance Committee Chairman Max Baucus and ranking member Chuck Grassley acknowledged their review of Sebelius found no other items needing to be addressed and Baucus, a Democrat, publicly expressed his continued support for Sebelius' nomination.

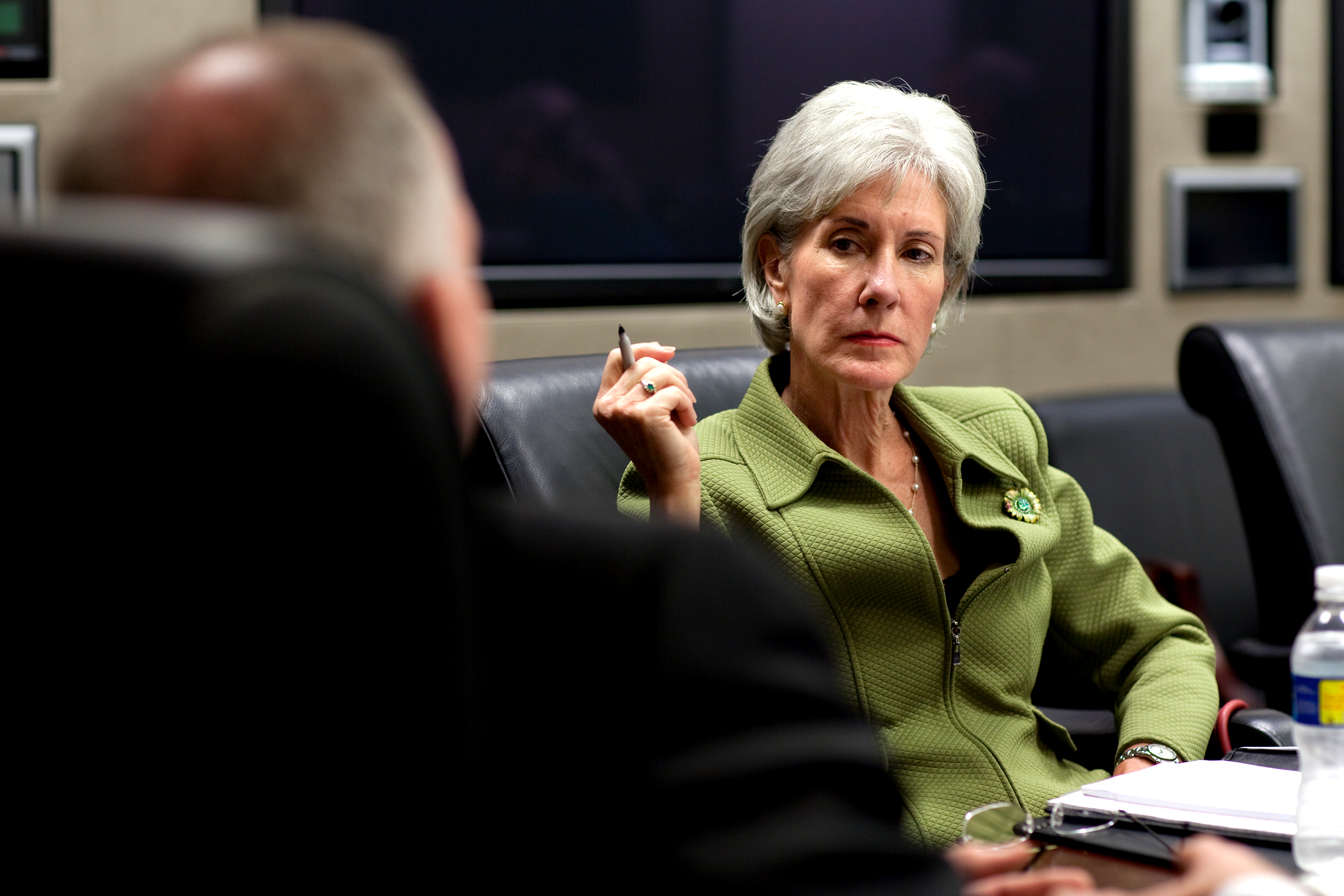
Sebelius at an HHS meeting in April 2009

Pro life activists and senators were the primary opponents of Sebelius's nomination. In answer to questions from the Senate Finance Committee during her April 2009 confirmation hearing, Sebelius stated she received $12,450 between 1994 and 2001 from physician George Tiller, one of only three late term abortion providers nationwide, who was later assassinated. The Associated Press, however, reported that from 2000 to 2002 Tiller gave at least $23,000 more to a political action committee Sebelius established to raise money for Democrats while she was serving as state insurance commissioner.

The Senate Finance Committee approved Sebelius' nomination with a vote of 15 to 8. The full United States Senate voted to confirm Sebelius by a vote of 65 to 31. She was sworn in on April 28, 2009, amidst an outbreak of swine flu in the United States. Lieutenant Governor Parkinson was sworn in as Governor of Kansas and served the remainder of Sebelius's term. As Secretary of Health and Human Services, Sebelius led an agency with 6,500 employees and a $700 billion annual budget.

=== Affordable Care Act ===
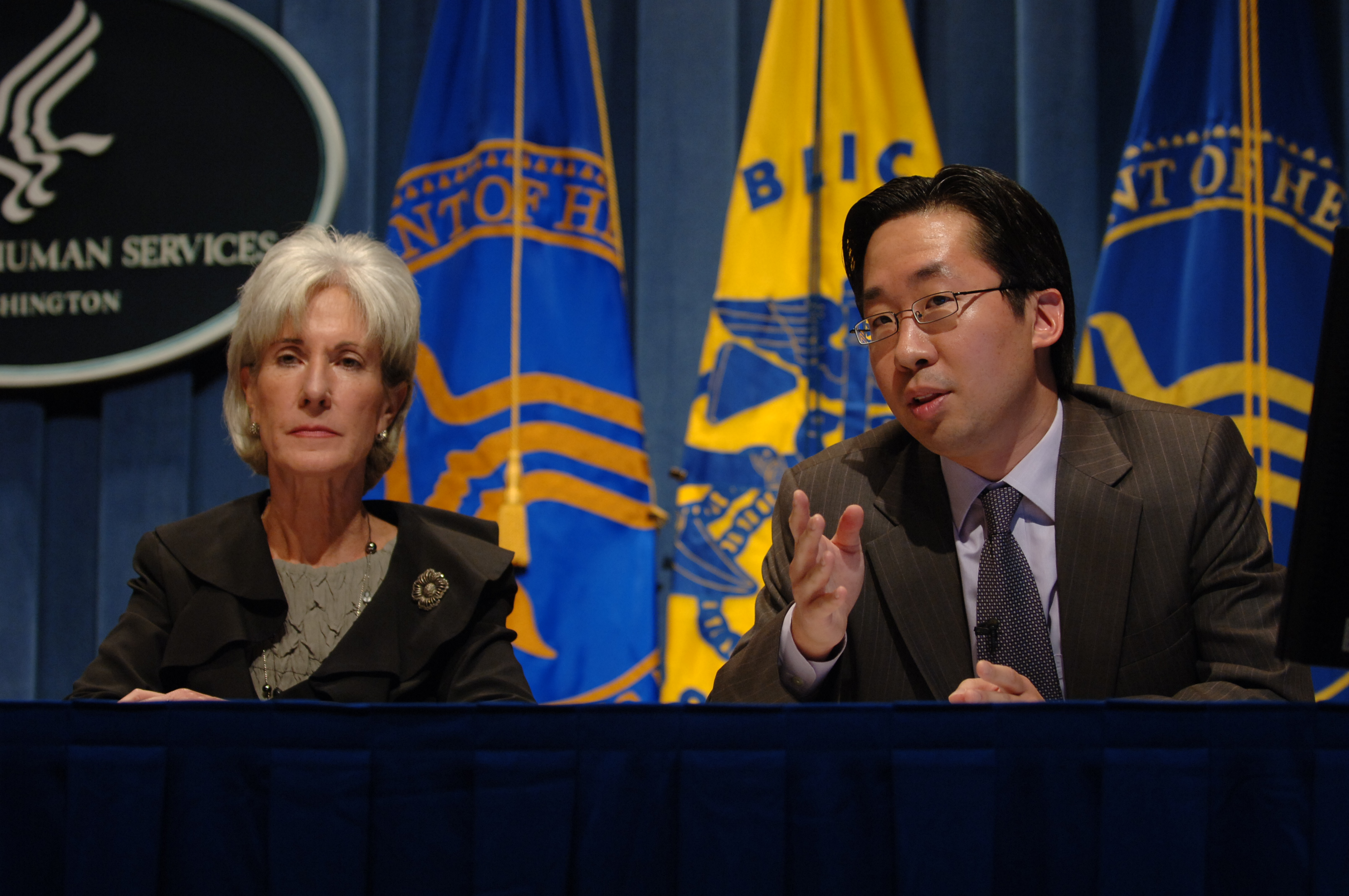
Sebelius and Todd Park, the White House's chief technology officer

Sebelius is a staunch advocate for the Affordable Care Act (ACA), also known as Obamacare. In response to glitches and failures during the launch of the ACA website, HealthCare.gov, she said in October 2013, "You deserve better. I apologize. I'm accountable to you for fixing these problems and I'm committed to earning your confidence back by fixing the site." Republicans called for her resignation in response to the website problems. Fifty-five members of the House of Representatives called for her resignation, while U.S. Senators Ted Cruz, Lamar Alexander and Pat Roberts all called for her resignation. In response to the calls to resign, Sebelius said: "The majority of people calling for me to resign I would say are people who I don't work for, and who do not want this program to work in the first place."

In 2009, 2010, and 2011, Forbes named Sebelius the 57th, 23rd, and 13th most powerful woman in the world, respectively.

=== Hatch Act concern ===
On September 13, 2012, the Office of Special Counsel charged Sebelius with violating the Hatch Act by making a political remark during an official government event. Sebelius's office reclassified the event from official to political and reimbursed the government's expenses.

=== Resignation ===
On April 11, 2014, Sebelius announced her resignation from her position as Secretary of Health and Human Services. That same day, President Obama nominated Sylvia Mathews Burwell as Sebelius' successor. Burwell was sworn in on June 9, 2014.

== Political positions ==
=== Abortion ===
Sebelius is "staunchly pro-choice". Her office stated that abortions declined 8.5% during her tenure as governor. According to the Kansas Department of Health and Environment statistics, the number of induced abortions in Kansas declined by 1,568, or 12.6%, from 2001 to 2007, the year of the most recently available statistics. Her administration attributes the decline to health care reforms that Sebelius initiated, including "adoption incentives, extended health services for pregnant women..., sex education and ... a variety of support services for families". Nationally, the number of abortions declined approximately 7.6% from 2000 to 2005, the year of the most recently available and reliable U.S. statistics.

Sebelius has been endorsed by Planned Parenthood, which has raised funds on her behalf. In 2003, 2005, 2006, and again in 2008, Sebelius vetoed legislation that would have limited abortions in Kansas.

On April 21, 2008, Sebelius vetoed House Substitute for Senate Bill 389, titled the Comprehensive Abortion Reform Act by its sponsors. Proponents of the bill argued the legislation would strengthen late-term abortion laws and prevent so-called "coerced abortions", particularly with respect to minors. The Kansas City Star reported that HS SB 389 would have required the State of Kansas to collect patient diagnostic information providing detailed medical justification for late-term abortions, and would have also permitted litigants to sue abortion providers if they thought that a relative of theirs was planning a late-term abortion in violation of Kansas law. Sebelius objected to the constitutionality, efficacy and morality of the proposed legislation. She wrote, "The United States Supreme Court decisions make clear that any law regulating abortion must contain exceptions for pregnancies which endanger the woman's life or health. However, SB 389 allows a variety of individuals to seek a court order preventing a woman from obtaining an abortion, even where it may be necessary to save her life. I am concerned that the bill is unconstitutional or even worse, endangers the lives of women." In addition, she expressed concern that the bill would "likely encourage extensive litigation" and that it "unnecessarily jeopardizes the privacy of Kansas women's confidential medical records".

Sebelius is a member of the Catholic Church; however, in early March 2009, then-Archbishop Raymond Leo Burke, prefect for the Apostolic Signatura, the Holy See's highest court, declared that Sebelius should not approach the altar for Communion in the United States, saying that, "after pastoral admonition, she obstinately persists in serious sin". Kansas City Archbishop Joseph Fred Naumann also asked that Sebelius no longer receive Holy Communion because of her position on abortion. Naumann criticized Sebelius for vetoing HS SB 389. The action received mixed reviews in the Catholic press.

Anti-abortion activists criticized Sebelius's HHS nomination because she had received donations to her campaign from George Tiller, the medical director of an abortion clinic in Wichita. Not long after Sebelius was sworn in as HHS Secretary, on May 31, 2009, Tiller was assassinated by Scott Roeder.

=== Morning-after pill ===
Despite her pro-choice view, in December 2011, Sebelius overruled the FDA's recommendation on making the "morning-after pill" (Plan B One-Step) available over the counter for females under the age of 17. President Obama said that the decision was Sebelius's, not his.

Judge Edward R. Korman of the United States District Court for the Eastern District of New York struck down this restriction, calling it "frivolous" and "silly", and alleging that pure politics — not scientific evidence — was behind efforts by Sebelius to block easier distribution to young girls. The Obama administration, in response, lowered the age limit from 17 to 15 but decided to appeal this ruling to maintain the loosened restrictions, in a move that was widely criticized by advocates of reproductive rights.

=== Capital punishment ===
Sebelius opposes the death penalty. During her first term, the Kansas capital punishment laws were declared unconstitutional by the Kansas Supreme Court. However, on appeal by Kansas Attorney General Phill Kline, the ruling was again overturned and the current law reinstated by the United States Supreme Court.

=== Drug importation ===
As Governor of Kansas, Sebelius adopted a state drug importation program in 2004 to help her constituents afford prescription medication. The program, called I-saveRx, connected individuals with and helped them buy medication from licensed pharmacies in Canada, Ireland and the United Kingdom. The program later went on to include Australia and New Zealand. Due to federal laws prohibiting personal drug importation under most circumstances, the FDA intercepted some prescription orders en route to Americans who participated in I-SaveRx; while in most cases prescription imports for personal use are not seized.

=== Education ===
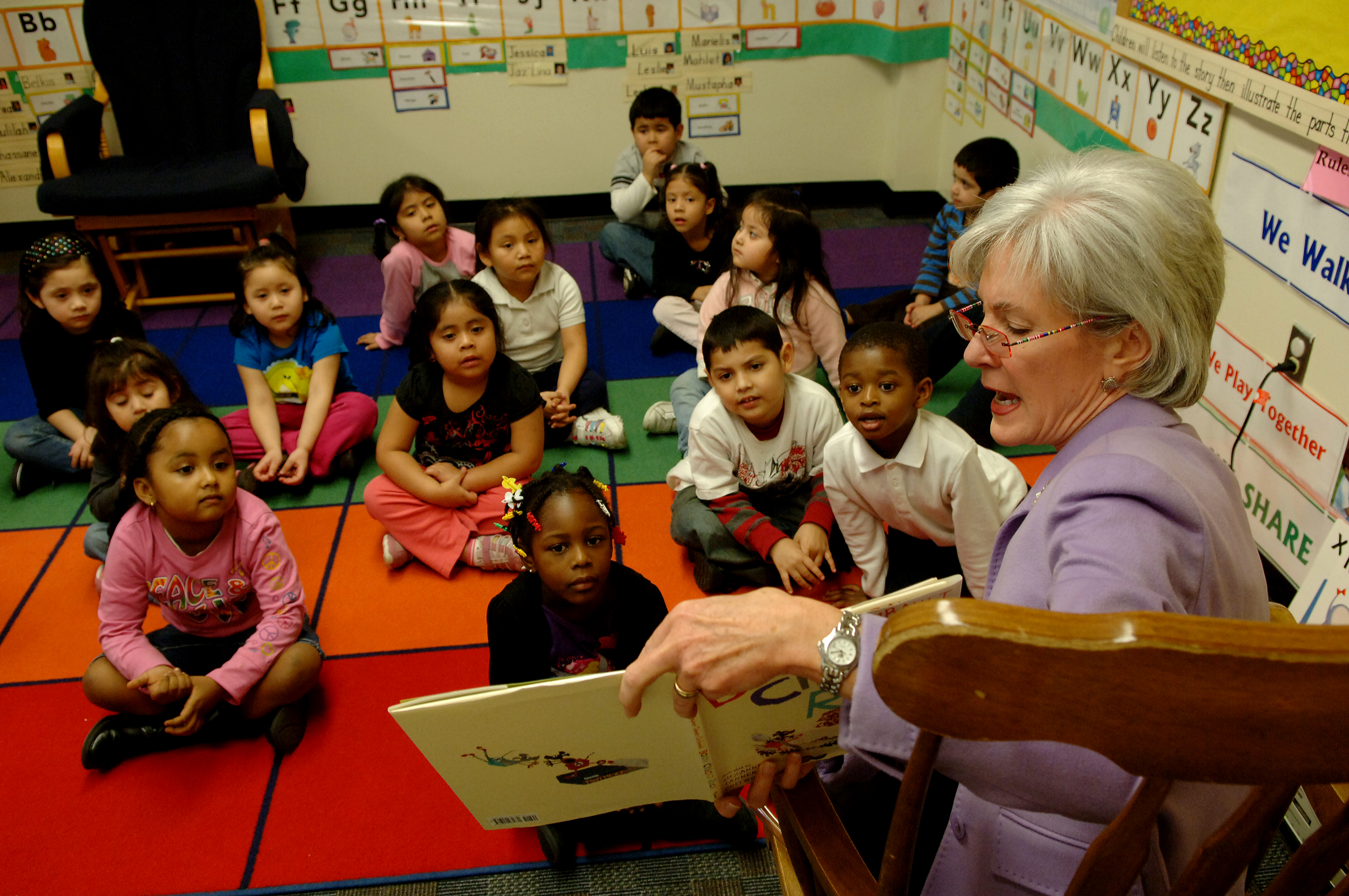
Sebelius at Cool Springs Elementary School in Adelphi, Maryland

Early in the term, Sebelius made education funding her top priority. Education funding reached a breaking point in the summer of 2005 when the Kansas Supreme Court ordered the Legislature to increase K–12 funding. Sebelius offered one education funding plan early in her first term, which consisted of property, sales, and income tax increases, resulting in 2006 in the largest K–12 education funding increase in the history of the state. The three-year plan aimed to increase education funding by nearly $1 billion over three years, but did not give a funding source for the second and third years.

=== Environment ===
Sebelius chaired the Governors' Ethanol Coalition. In 2006, she requested that $200 million be allotted from the U.S. government to support the Department of Energy Biomass and Biorefinery Systems Research and Development Program. She pushed for more widespread recycling efforts across the state. In addition, she vetoed bills authorizing the construction of coal-fired power plants on three separate occasions saying in March 2008, "We know that greenhouse gases contribute to climate change. As an agricultural state, Kansas is particularly vulnerable. Therefore, reducing pollutants benefits our state not only in the short term — but also for generations of Kansans to come." On June 2, 2008, Sebelius spoke at the American Wind Energy Association Conference, calling for greater federal support for wind energy and other renewable energy resources.

=== Firearms ===
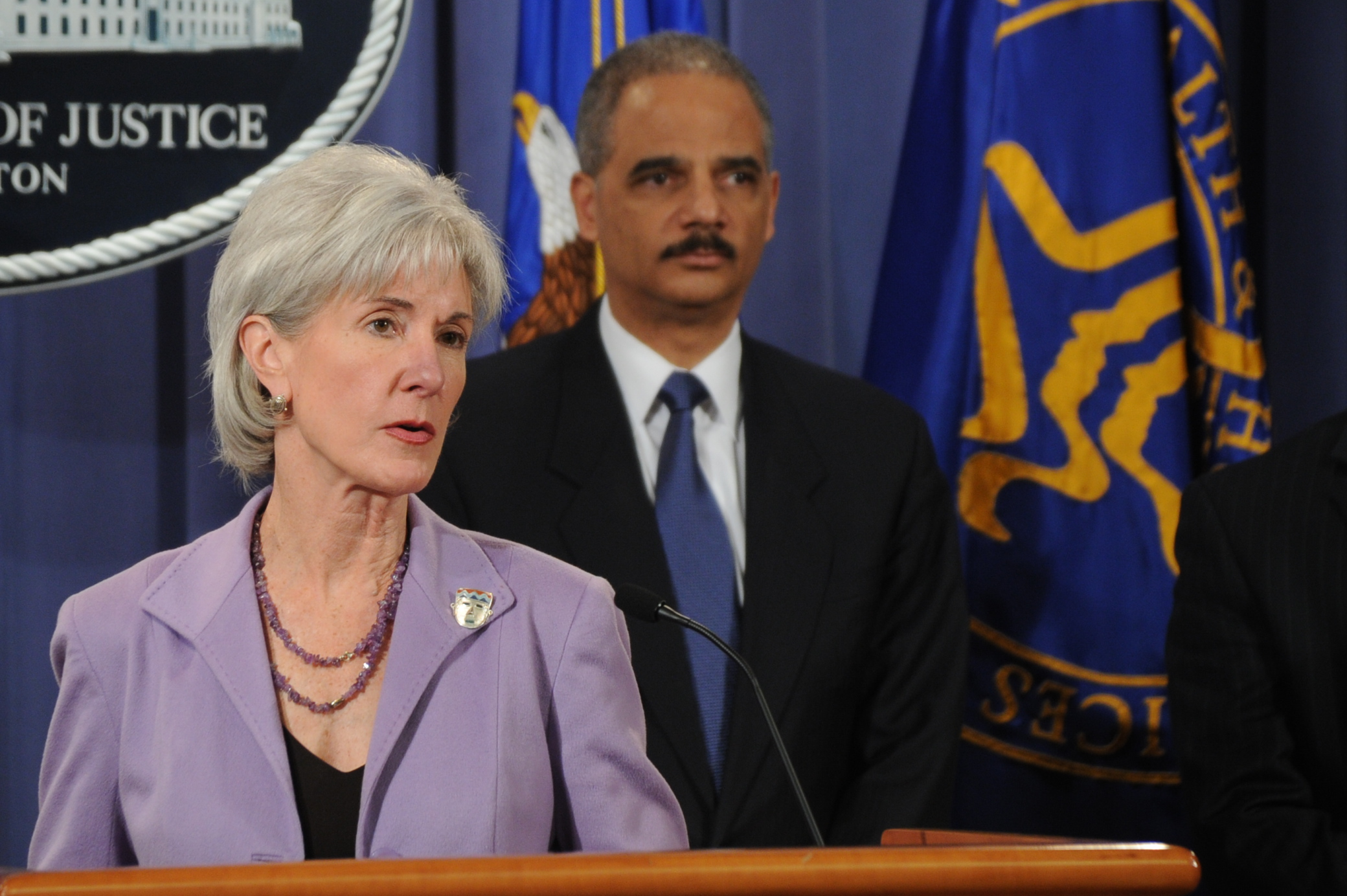
Sebelius and Eric Holder

Sebelius has said she supports Kansans' right to own firearms, but does not believe a broad concealed carry law would make them safer: "I don't believe allowing people to carry concealed handguns into sporting events, shopping malls, grocery stores, or the workplace would be good public policy. And to me the likelihood of exposing children to loaded handguns in their parents' purses, pockets and automobiles is simply unacceptable."

Sebelius vetoed, like her Republican predecessor Bill Graves, a concealed-carry law that would have allowed citizens to carry concealed weapons after obtaining a state permit and passing an FBI background check. The veto left Kansas, at the time, as one of four states without any form of a conceal-carry law.

On March 21, 2006, she vetoed Senate Bill 418, a similar concealed-carry bill. On March 25, her veto was overturned after the Kansas House of Representatives voted 91–33 to override it. This followed the Kansas Senate's 30-10 override vote, which occurred the day after her veto.

On April 21, 2008, Sebelius signed Senate Bill 46 into law, which repealed a 1933 state law prohibiting civilian ownership of machine guns and other firearms restricted by the National Firearms Act of 1934, specifically permitting ownership by civilians successfully meeting the requirements of the NFA. The law was passed in part to address legal issues that could have prevented dealers from delivering firearms to law enforcement agencies in Kansas. The law took effect on July 1, 2008.

=== LGBT issues ===
Sebelius did not support an April 2005 amendment to the Kansas Constitution that made same-sex marriage in the state unconstitutional. Sebelius said she supported the existing state law outlawing same-sex marriage, viewing it as sufficient, and therefore opposed the constitutional amendment. The amendment passed with 70% voter approval.

== Subsequent career ==
After leaving the Obama cabinet, Sebelius founded and became CEO of Sebelius Resources LLC, which provides strategic advice to private companies, non-profit organizations, higher education institutions, and financial investors.

Sebelius serves as a member of the boards of directors of companies including Dermira Inc., Grand Rounds, Inc., Exact Sciences, and Humacyte Inc., and of the Estee Lauder Foundation and the Kaiser Family Foundation. In 1978, she was elected to the Common Cause National Governing Board. She serves on advisory boards for the Dole Institute of Politics and Solera Health. Sebelius is a senior advisor to Out Leadership and the Aspen Institute, where she co-chairs the Aspen Health Strategy Group. Sebelius is a frequent keynote speaker for national and international organizations.

In August 2023, Sebelius was awarded the Kettering Foundation David Mathews Democracy Fellowship Award.

== Personal life ==
She married K. Gary Sebelius, the son of former Republican Congressman Keith Sebelius. The wedding was held in the Ohio Governor's Mansion in 1974. They have two sons: Ned (b. 1982) and John (b. 1985). Her husband served as a United States Magistrate Judge for the District of Kansas for 16 years until his retirement in 2019.

Her family has a vacation home built by her grandfather located in Leland, Michigan. An avid fan of jazz music, Sebelius annually attended the Jazz Fest in New Orleans for thirty years. She also runs in her spare time.

== Electoral history ==
Kansas gubernatorial election 2002
Party	Candidate	Votes	%	±%
Democratic	Kathleen Sebelius	435,462	52.9	
Republican	Tim Shallenburger	371,325	45.3	

Kansas gubernatorial election 2006
Party	Candidate	Votes	%	±%
Democratic	Kathleen Sebelius (incumbent)	480,532	57.8	+4.9
Republican	Jim Barnett	336,583	40.5	

== See also ==
- List of female United States Cabinet members
- List of female governors in the United States

Party political offices
Preceded by Paul Feleciano	Democratic nominee for Insurance Commissioner of Kansas; 1994, 1998	Succeeded by Jim Garner
Preceded by Tom Sawyer	Democratic nominee for Governor of Kansas; 2002, 2006	Succeeded by Tom Holland
Preceded by Bill Richardson	Chair of the Democratic Governors Association; 2006–2007	Succeeded by Joe Manchin
Preceded by Jim Webb	Response to the State of the Union address 2008	Succeeded by Bobby Jindal
Political offices
Preceded by Ronald Todd	Insurance Commissioner of Kansas; 1995–2003	Succeeded by Sandy Praeger
Preceded by Bill Graves	Governor of Kansas; 2003–2009	Succeeded by Mark Parkinson
Preceded by Mike Leavitt	United States Secretary of Health and Human Services; 2009–2014	Succeeded by Sylvia Mathews Burwell
U.S. order of precedence (ceremonial)
Preceded by Gary Locke as Former U.S. Cabinet Member	Order of precedence of the United States as Former U.S. Cabinet Member	Succeeded by Leon Panetta as Former U.S. Cabinet Member
