= Mark Parkinson =

American businessman and politician

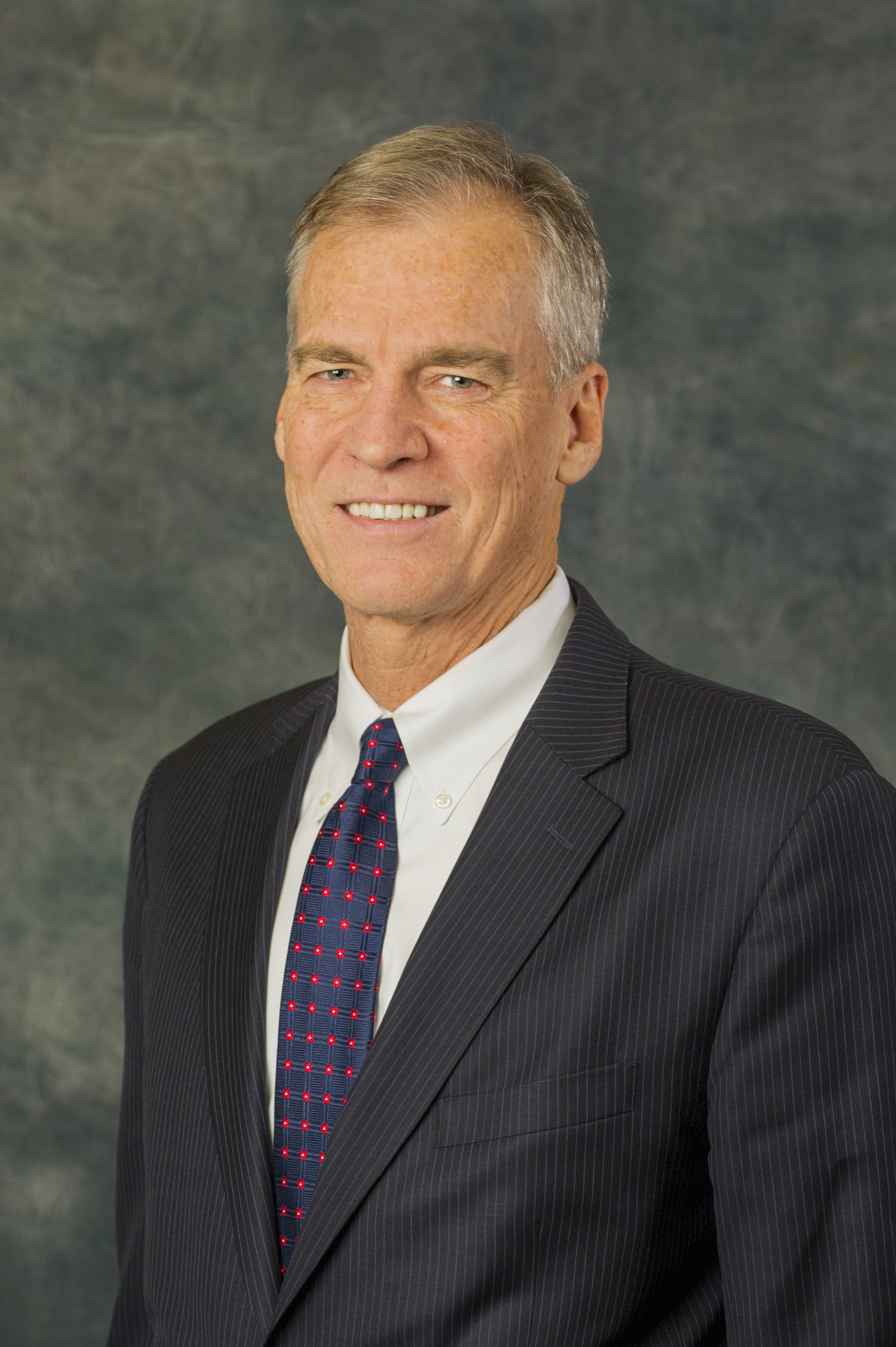

45th Governor of Kansas
- In office April 28, 2009 – January 10, 2011
- Lieutenant: Troy Findley
- Preceded by: Kathleen Sebelius
- Succeeded by: Sam Brownback

47th Lieutenant Governor of Kansas
- In office January 4, 2007 – April 28, 2009
- Governor: Kathleen Sebelius
- Preceded by: John Moore
- Succeeded by: Troy Findley

Chair of the Kansas Republican Party
- In office January 1999 – January 2003
- Preceded by: Steve Abrams
- Succeeded by: Dennis Jones

Member of the Kansas Senate from the 23rd district
- In office January 11, 1993 – January 13, 1997
- Preceded by: Ross Doyen
- Succeeded by: Karin Brownlee

Member of the Kansas House of Representatives from the 14th district
- In office January 14, 1991 – January 11, 1993
- Preceded by: Bettie Shumway
- Succeeded by: Kay O'Connor

Personal details
- Born: Mark Vincent Parkinson; June 24, 1957 (age 69) Wichita, Kansas, U.S.
- Party: Republican (before 2006); Democratic (2006–present)
- Spouse: Stacy Abbott
- Children: 3
- Education: Wichita State University (BA); University of Kansas (JD)
- Website: Official website (archived)

Mark Vincent Parkinson (born June 24, 1957) is an American businessman and former politician serving as head of the American Health Care Association (AHCA) and National Center for Assisted Living (NCAL). He served as the 47th lieutenant governor of Kansas from 2007 to 2009 and the 45th governor of Kansas from 2009 until 2011. He was also a state legislator.

== Early life, family, education, and career ==
Parkinson was born in 1957 in Wichita, Kansas, to a family with roots in Scott City, where Parkinson still owns a farm. Parkinson's father, Hank, worked in advertising, public relations and political consulting. He married his wife Stacy (née Abbott) in 1983. They have three children.

Parkinson graduated from Wichita Heights High School. In 1980, he graduated summa cum laude from Wichita State University. In 1984, he graduated first in his class at the University of Kansas Law School. Parkinson won the national moot court championship during law school.

Parkinson immediately entered private practice after graduation. He was a founding partner of Parkinson, Foth & Orrick in 1986. In 1996, Parkinson left his law practice to develop elder care facilities in Kansas and Missouri. His wife was an attorney. In 2006, Parkinson and his wife sold two care facilities in Shawnee.

== Kansas Legislature ==
Parkinson served in the Kansas House of Representatives from 1991 to 1993. He served in the Kansas Senate from 1993 to 1997. The districts he represented included Olathe, Kansas. During his time in the legislature, he helped write the state's death penalty law. He also wrote legislation to facilitate the consolidation of the Wyandotte County government. He stood out for opposing a bill that would have banned flag burning. Parkinson declined to run for reelection to the state senate in 1996.

From 1999 to 2003, he was chairman of the Kansas Republican Party. He secured this role in part from the support of Governor William Graves. In 2004, he served as chairman of the Shawnee Area Chamber of Commerce, and in 2005, served as the "Chair of the Chairs" of the six chambers of commerce in Johnson County.

== Lieutenant Governor of Kansas ==
In May 2006, Governor Kathleen Sebelius announced that Parkinson had switched parties and was her running mate for her reelection campaign, succeeding retiring Lieutenant Governor John E. Moore, also a former Republican who had switched parties shortly before he joined a ticket with Sebelius. Parkinson's business experience and track record of working with both Republicans and Democrats were the reasons Sebelius stated for choosing him.

As lieutenant governor, Parkinson focused a significant amount of time on energy issues. He served as co-chairman of the Kansas Energy Council. He also served on the Wind Working Group. In 2008, Parkinson participated in a delegation of lieutenant governors on a trade mission to China. As chairman of the American Recovery and Reinvestment Act Advisory Group, Parkinson helped decide how to spend federal stimulus funds allocated to Kansas.

== Governor of Kansas ==
In March 2009, President Barack Obama announced Sebelius as his nominee for United States Secretary of Health and Human Services. Sebelius resigned as governor of Kansas following her confirmation on April 28, 2009; Parkinson was sworn in as governor the same day. Parkinson stated he would not be a candidate in the 2010 election and was succeeded by Republican Sam Brownback.

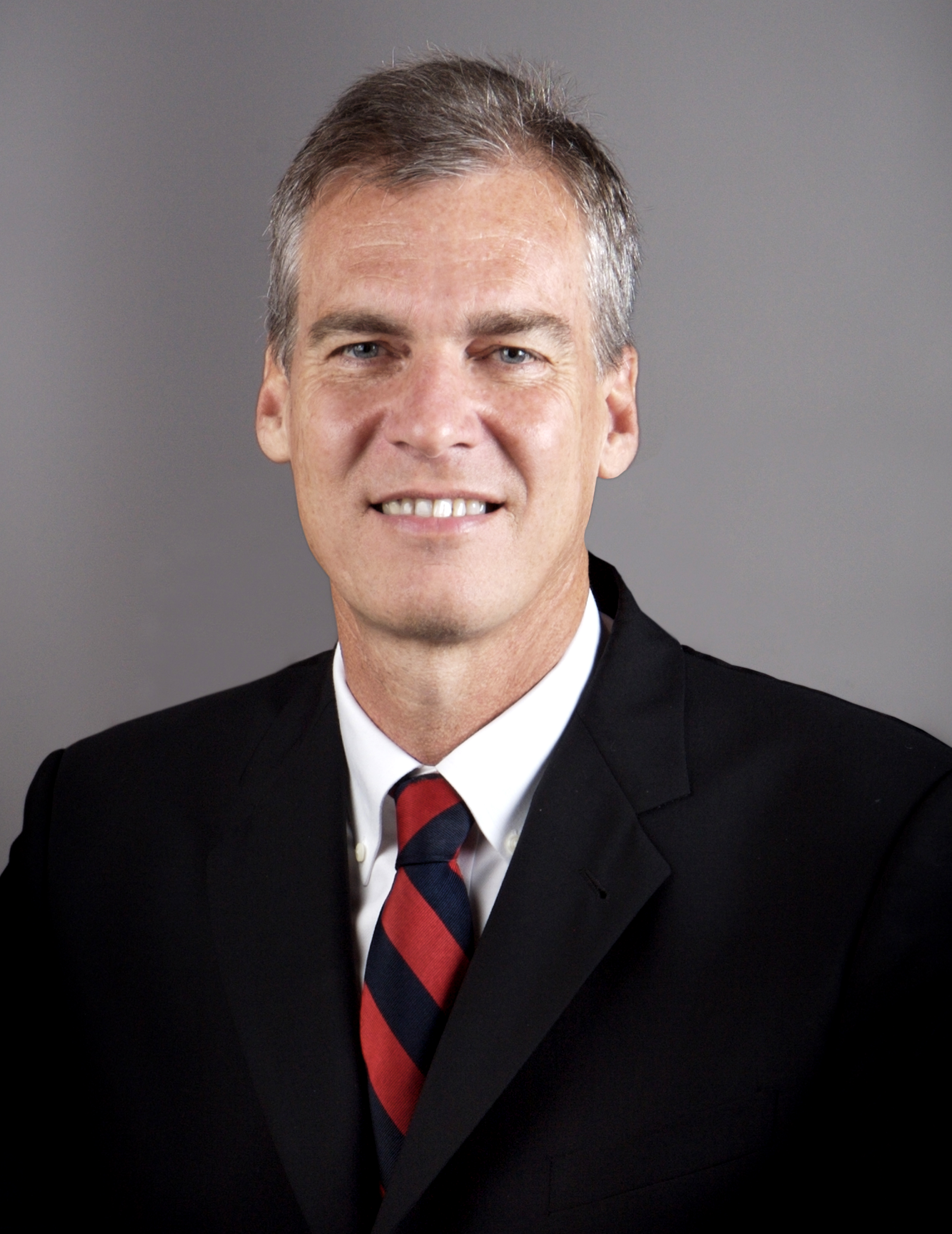
Parkinson's gubernatorial portrait

During his time as governor, Parkinson had to implement spending cuts and tax increases in order to manage a budget deficit. Under his leadership, the state developed a comprehensive energy policy including net metering, and a 10-year plan for maintaining transportation infrastructure. Parkinson implemented a smoking ban that included public places; taxicabs and limousines; common areas in public and private buildings, condominiums and other multiple-residential facilities and entries to most buildings.

Parkinson opposed moving detainees from Guantanamo Bay. He signed legislation to create a private cause of action for victims of child pornography. Parkinson lobbied the governors of Missouri and Nebraska to preserve the Big 12 Conference. He led a trade mission to Taiwan and another to mainland China.

Citing his bipartisan support and ability to move the state forward in challenging economic times, The Topeka Capital-Journal named Parkinson "Kansan of the Year" in 2009. In late 2010, Parkinson was honored by Kansas Advocates for Better Care for his work in elder care. Parkinson received the organization's second annual Caring Award, which is given to recognize exemplary contributions of leadership in providing quality care for frail elders and persons with disabilities in Kansas.

== Post-political career ==
Parkinson and his wife, Stacy, have been involved in several campaigns to benefit non-profit and public organizations. The Parkinsons led a $4.29 million fundraising campaign for Sunflower House in 2002. They led another fundraising drive for SAFEHOME in 2005. Together with two other couples, the Parkinsons co-chaired the University of Kansas' fundraising efforts from 2012 to 2016. $1.5 billion was raised under their leadership.

As of 2020, Parkinson is president and chief executive officer of the American Health Care Association (AHCA) and National Center for Assisted Living. (NCAL) The group represented about 9,000 facilities when Parkinson joined the association. Parkinson helped heal a major rift in the AHCA/NCAL and brought numerous providers who left to form their own association back into the fold. As of 2020, AHCA/NCAL has about 14,000 members.

As president and CEO of AHCA/NCAL, Parkinson was recognized by CEO Update as a "Top Association CEO" of 2013. He was named to Modern Healthcare's "100 Most Influential People in Healthcare in 2015 and 2020. Parkinson has been recognized as a "Top Lobbyist" by The Hill in 2013 and over the next seven years.

In February 2024, he announced that he would be retiring from his post as president and CEO of AHCA/NCAL, effective January 2025.

== Electoral history ==
Kansas State House District 14 election, 1990
Party	Candidate	Votes	%	±%
Republican	Mark Parkinson	2,880	71.73	−
Democratic	Michael R. Norlen	1,135	28.27	−

Party political offices
Preceded by Steve Abrams	Chair of the Kansas Republican Party; 1999–2003	Succeeded by Dennis Jones
Preceded by John Moore	Democratic nominee for Lieutenant Governor of Kansas; 2006	Succeeded by Kelly Kultala
Political offices
Preceded by John Moore	Lieutenant Governor of Kansas; 2007–2009	Succeeded by Troy Findley
Preceded by Kathleen Sebelius	Governor of Kansas; 2009–2011	Succeeded by Sam Brownback
U.S. order of precedence (ceremonial)
Preceded by Bill Graves as Former Governor	Order of precedence of the United States	Succeeded by Jeff Colyer as Former Governor
