= Jeff Longbine =

American politician

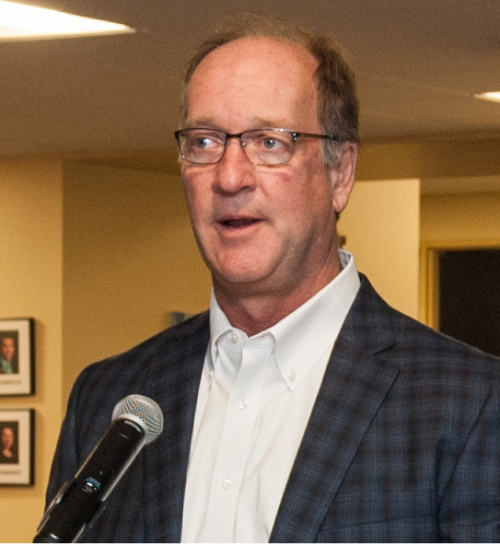

Member of the Kansas Senate from the 17th district
- In office October 13, 2010 – January 13, 2025; Interim: October 13, 2010 – January 10, 2011
- Preceded by: Jim Barnett
- Succeeded by: Mike Argabright

Personal details
- Born: April 24, 1962 (age 64) Emporia, Kansas, U.S.
- Party: Republican
- Spouse: Gwendolyn Yarnell
- Children: 3 (1 deceased)
- Education: Emporia State University; University of Kansas
- Profession: Car dealer

Jeffrey S. Longbine (born April 24, 1962) is an American politician who served as a Republican member of the Kansas Senate, representing the 17th district from 2010 to 2025. Longbine served as Vice President of the Senate from 2017 to 2021. He did not seek re-election in 2024.

Longbine is the owner of the car dealership Longbine Autoplaza in Emporia.

== Committee assignments ==
Sen. Longbine serves on these legislative committees:

- Financial Institutions and Insurance (chair)
- Federal and State Affairs
- Kansas Public Employees Retirement System Select (vice chair)
- Joint Committee on Corrections and Juvenile Justice Oversight
- State Building Construction
- Transportation

== Major donors ==
Some of the top contributors to Sen. Longbine's 2012 campaign, according to the Project Vote Smart:

Jeff Longbine (self-finance), Longbine Enterprises, AT&T, Kansas Chamber of Commerce, Kansas Association of Insurance Agents, Kansas Livestock Association, Kansas Contractors Association, Kansas Bankers Association, Kansas Food Dealers Association, Kansas Medical Society, Kansas State Farm Insurance Agents, American Council of Engineering Companies of Kansas, Security Benefit Life Insurance, Heavy Contractors Association, Koger Agency, Amidon Plaza Redevelopment LLC, Kansas Jobs PAC, Kansas National Education Association, Farmers Insurance Group, Kansas Dental Association, J.C. Hawes, Kansas Values, BNSF Railway, Senate Republican Leadership Committee of Kansas

Sen. Longbine financed $15,000 of his own campaign, and Longbine Enterprises an additional $15,000, more than any of his other donor groups.
