= Kansas's 17th Senate district =

American legislative district

Kansas's 17th State Senate district
Senator
Mike Argabright; R–Emporia
- Demographics: 67% White; 9% Black; 17% Hispanic; 2% Asian; 1% Native American; 4% Other
- Population (2018): 72,851

Kansas's 17th Senate district is one of 40 districts in the Kansas Senate. It has been represented by Republican Mike Argabright since 2025.

== Geography ==
District 17 stretches from Emporia in the south to the outskirts of Manhattan in the north, covering all of Lyon County and parts of Geary, Pottawatomie, and Wabaunsee Counties. Other communities in the district include Grandview Plaza, most of Junction City, and part of Wamego.

The district is located entirely within Kansas's 1st congressional district, and overlaps with the 51st, 60th, 65th, 68th, and 76th districts of the Kansas House of Representatives.

== Recent election results ==
=== 2020 ===
2020 Kansas Senate election, District 17
Party	Candidate	Votes	%
Republican	Jeff Longbine (incumbent)	17,363	66.7
Democratic	Stephen Vecchione	8,671	33.3
Total votes		26,034	100
Republican hold			

=== 2016 ===
2016 Kansas Senate election, District 17
Party	Candidate	Votes	%
Republican	Jeff Longbine (incumbent)	13,161	59.0
Democratic	Susan Fowler	9,147	41.0
Total votes		22,308	100
Republican hold			

=== 2012 ===
2012 Kansas Senate election, District 17
Primary election
Party	Candidate	Votes	%
Republican	Jeff Longbine (incumbent)	3,858	59.6
Republican	James Fawcett	2,619	40.4
Total votes		6,477	100
General election
Republican	Jeff Longbine (incumbent)	12,831	60.8
Democratic	Susan Moran	8,285	39.2
Total votes		21,116	100
Republican hold			

=== Federal and statewide results ===
Year	Office	Results
2020	President	Trump 56.4 – 40.7%
2018	Governor	Kelly 48.0 – 40.2%
2016	President	Trump 56.8 – 35.7%
2012	President	Romney 56.8 – 41.0%
