= List of first minority male lawyers and judges in Kansas =

This is a list of the first minority male lawyer(s) and judge(s) in Kansas. It includes the year in which the men were admitted to practice law (in parentheses). Also included are men who achieved other distinctions such becoming the first in their state to graduate from law school or become a political figure.

== Firsts in Kansas' history ==
=== Lawyer ===
- First African American male: John H. Morris (1871)

=== State judges ===
- First African American male: Cordell D. Meeks Sr. (1939) in 1972
- First Asian American male: Tommy B. Webb in 1988
- First African American male (Third Judicial District): Joseph D. Johnson in 2005
- First South Asian male (Kansas Supreme Court): K. Christopher Jayaram in 2026

=== Federal judges ===
- First Hispanic-American male (U.S. District Court for the District of Kansas): Carlos Murguia (1982) in 1999

=== United States Attorney ===
- First African American male: Benjamin E. Franklin from 1968-1969

=== District Attorney ===
- First African American male: Mark A. Dupree, Sr. in 2017

=== Public Defender ===
- First African American male: Joseph D. Johnson in 1975

=== Kansas Bar Association ===
- First African American male president: Mark Dupree in 2024

== Firsts in local history ==
- William D. Harrison: First African American male lawyer in Edwards County, Kansas
- G.W. Jones: First African American male to serve as the County Attorney for Graham County, Kansas (1896)
- Baron Hoy: First African American male to serve as the Assistant City Attorney of Newton, Harvey County, Kansas (2025)
- Joseph D. Johnson: First African American male appointed as a Judge of the Third Judicial District in Kansas (2005) [Shawnee County, Kansas]
- Mark A. Dupree, Sr.: First African American to serve as the District Attorney of Wyandotte County, Kansas (2017)

== See also ==
- List of first minority male lawyers and judges in the United States

== Other topics of interest ==
- List of first women lawyers and judges in the United States
- List of first women lawyers and judges in Kansas
