= List of first women lawyers and judges in Kansas =

This is a list of the first women lawyer(s) and judge(s) in Kansas. It includes the year in which the women were admitted to practice law (in parentheses). Also included are women who achieved other distinctions such becoming the first in their state to graduate from law school or become a political figure.

== Firsts in Kansas' history ==
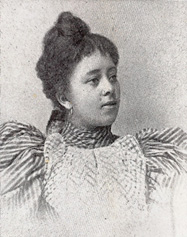
Lutie Lytle: First African American female lawyer in Kansas (1897)

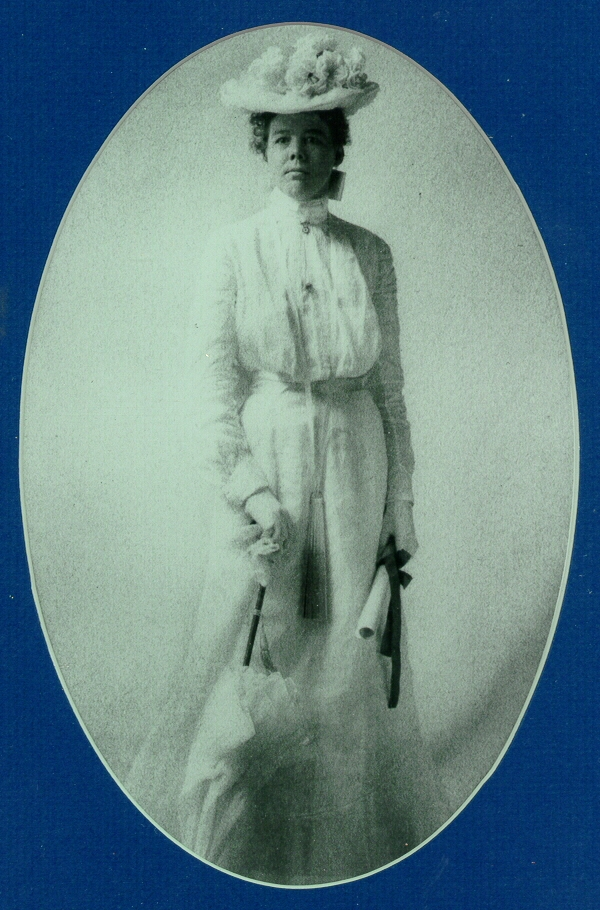
Lyda Conley: First Native American female lawyer in Kansas (1902)

=== Lawyers ===
- First female: Jennie Mitchell Kellogg (1880)
- First African American female: Lutie Lytle (1897)
- First Native American (Wyandot) female: Lyda Conley (1902)
- First female to argue a case before the Supreme Court of Kansas: Nellie Cline Steenson
- First Latino American female: M. Rebeca Mendoza (1975)

=== State judges ===
- First female (probate court): Mary H. Cooper in 1908
- First African American female: Jennifer L. Jones (1985) in 1992
- First female (district court): Kay McFarland (1964) in 1973
- First female (Supreme Court of Kansas): Kay McFarland (1964) in 1977
- First female (Kansas Court of Appeals): Mary Beck Briscoe in 1984
- First female (Chief Justice; Supreme Court of Kansas): Kay McFarland (1964) in 1995
- First female (Eleventh District of Kansas): Lori Bolton Fleming in 2012
- First female (Ninth District of Kansas): Marilyn M. Wilder in 2015
- First Jewish female (Supreme Court of Kansas): Melissa Taylor Standridge in 2020
- First female of color (African American) (Kansas Court of Appeals): Jacy J. Hurst in 2021
- First Hispanic American (female) (Kansas Court of Appeals): Rachel L. Pickering in 2022

=== Federal judges ===
- First female (U.S. District Court for the District of Kansas): Kathryn H. Vratil in 1992
- First African American female (U.S. District Court for the District of Kansas): Julie A. Robinson (1981) in 2001

=== Attorney General of Kansas ===
- First female: Carla Stovall from 1995 to 2003

=== Assistant Attorney General ===
- First female: Jennie Mitchell Kellogg (1880) from 1891 to 1893

=== United States Attorney ===
- First female: Kate E. Brubacher in 2023

=== County Attorney ===
- First female: Elfrieda Kenyon around 1939

=== Political Office ===
- Kathryn O’Loughlin McCarthy (1921): First female (a lawyer) to serve in Congress (1933-1935)
- Sharice Davids (2010): First Native American (Ho-Chunk tribe) and openly-LGBT female (a lawyer) elected to Congress in Kansas (2018)

=== Kansas Bar Association ===
- First female admitted: Marie Elizabeth Simpson Degeer Gilmore (1887)
- First female president: Christel E. Marquardt from 1987 to 1988

== Firsts in local history ==
- Lori Bolton Fleming: First female to become a Judge of the Eleventh District of Kansas (2012) [Cherokee, Crawford and Labette Counties, Kansas]
- Marilyn M. Wilder: First female appointed to the Kansas Judicial District No. 9 (2015) [Harvey and McPherson Counties, Kansas]
- Nanette L. Kemmerly-Weber: First female to serve as the County Attorney for Allen County, Kansas (1982)
- Lizzie S. Sheldon (1900): First female lawyer in Douglas County, Kansas
- Jean Shepherd: First female judge in Douglas County, Kansas (1984)
- Rebeca Mendoza: First Hispanic American female to graduate from the University of Kansas School of Law (1972) [Douglas County, Kansas]
- Christine Arguello (1980): First Hispanic American (female) to receive tenure at the University of Kansas School of Law
- Maritza Segarra: First female (and first Hispanic American female) judge in Geary County, Kansas (2004) and first Hispanic female appointed to a District Court in the State of Kansas (2007).
- Ida Tillotson (1881): First female lawyer in Graham County, Kansas
- Elfrieda Kenyon: First female to serve as the County Attorney for Hodgeman County, Kansas (c. 1939)
- Jalilah Otto: First African American (female) to serve as the Presiding Judge of the Jackson County Court (2023)
- Gwendolyn Van Derbur Falkenberg (1957): First female lawyer in Johnson County, Kansas
- Carolee Sauder Leek (1959): First female judge in Johnson County, Kansas (1965)
- Janette Sheldon: First female to serve as the President of the Johnson County Bar Association (1988)
- Rhonda Mason (1989): First African-American female judge in Johnson County, Kansas (2016)
- Beulah Wheeler (1925): First African American female lawyer in Leavenworth, Kansas [Leavenworth County, Kansas]
- Mary H. Cooper: First female probate judge in Beloit, Kansas (1908) [Mitchell County, Kansas]
- Sally Pokorny: First female to be elected as the County Attorney for Montgomery County, Kansas
- Thelma Helsper Boatman: First female to be elected as the County Attorney for Norton County, Kansas
- Shelley Depp (Greenwood) Bloomer: First female to serve as a County Attorney for Osborne County, Kansas (1975)
- Dorothy M. Jackson: First female district court judge in Lyons, Kansas (1922) [Rice County, Kansas]
- K. Seely Racine (1934): First female lawyer in Russell County, Kansas
- Nola Foulston: First female to serve as the District Attorney for Sedgwick County, Kansas (1988)
- Gloria Flentje: First female to serve as the President of the Wichita Bar Association (1991) [Sedgwick County, Kansas]
- Maxine Walker Wood: First female to serve as the County Attorney for Seward County, Kansas
- Jessie Nye: First female law graduate of the Washburn Law School (1912) [Shawnee County, Kansas]
- Kay McFarland (1964): First female elected to a judgeship in Shawnee County, Kansas (1971)
- Linda Diane Henry Elrod: First female to serve as the President of the Topeka Bar Association (1986) [Shawnee County, Kansas]
- Regina Victoria Mills Chambers (1900): First female lawyer in Sheridan County, Kansas
- LaVone Daily (1957): First female lawyer in Wyandotte County, Kansas
- Karen Shelor: First female to serve as the President of the Wyandotte County Bar Association (1986)
- Candice Alcaraz: First African American female district court judge in Wyandotte County, Kansas (2022)

== See also ==
- List of first women lawyers and judges in the United States
- Timeline of women lawyers in the United States
- Women in law

== Other topics of interest ==
- List of first minority male lawyers and judges in the United States
- List of first minority male lawyers and judges in Kansas
