= Jennie Mitchell Kellogg =

American lawyer (1850–1911)

- Born: March 4, 1850; Coshocton, Ohio
- Died: May 9, 1911 (aged 61)

Mary Virginia Mitchell Kellogg (March 4, 1850 – May 9, 1911) was an American lawyer. She was Kansas' first female lawyer and the first woman to serve as an assistant attorney general.

== Early life ==
Kellogg was born on March 4, 1850, in Coshocton, Ohio, to Daniel Patrick Mitchell and Anna Eliza Baker Mitchell. She was the oldest of eight children and grew up in Pennsylvania, where her father was a Methodist preacher. One of her sisters, Annie Mitchell, later active in the Nebraska chapter of the Daughters of the American Revolution and another sister, Mrs George Thatcher Guernsey, was active in the Kansas chapter. Her father was an abolitionist who edited the Topeka Journal and ran for governor of Kansas for the Greenback Party. In 1863, her father was appointed to a church in Leavenworth, Kansas, and the family moved with him except for Kellogg, who stayed in Pennsylvania. She entered the seminary and later married Benton Arthur in 1867. After his death of tuberculosis in 1872, she moved to Kansas to live with her parents. She met her second husband, Lyman Beecher Kellogg, in Emporia, Kansas, and they married on June 11, 1878.

== Career ==
In 1868, the state of Kansas changed its requirements for admission to the bar, removing the restriction that applicants had to be white men. Instead applicants had to read law for two years under the supervision of a practicing attorney who would certify that the applicant was of good moral character and qualified to practice law. Kellogg received her legal tutelage from her second husband and became the first woman authorized to practice law in Kansas. Kellogg was admitted to practice in the Lyon County district court on December 9, 1880, and was admitted to the bar of the Kansas Supreme Court on February 3, 1881. She was the first female lawyer admitted to practice law in Kansas.

She joined her husband's law practice in Emporia where she practiced for many years. She worked as an appellate lawyer and was listed as counsel in Case v. Huey, which reached the Kansas Supreme Court in 1881, and thirty other cases in the appellate courts. She was also likely the first Kansas woman to join a bar association. She was listed alongside her husband as a founding member of the Lyon County Bar Association. Kellogg began working as the assistant attorney general of Kansas in 1888 when her husband was elected as the Attorney General. She held this position for four years and drafted many opinions.

== Personal life ==
She was a delegate to the first meeting of the General Federation of Women's Clubs at the World's Columbian Exposition in 1893 and the Louisiana Purchase Exposition in 1904. She was also president of the Kansas Federation of Women's Clubs in 1895 and of the City Federation of Women's Clubs in 1901. Kellogg was an active public speaker and was an "indefatigable worker for women suffrage".

She raised a blended family with her second husband. They had three children, Charles Mitchell, Mary Virginia, and Joseph Mitchell, and Lyman had two sons from his previous marriage. Their two sons also became attorneys.

== Death and legacy ==
Kellogg died on May 9, 1911. It was reported that the entire Lyon County Bar attended her funeral. The Kansas Women Attorneys Association was initially called the Jennie Mitchell Kellogg Circle in her honor and has presented the Jennie Mitchell Kellogg Achievement Award since 1999.

== See also ==
- List of first women lawyers and judges in Kansas
- Kansas Women Attorneys Association
