= Age of consent in the United States =

Age of consent in the United States by state: Age of consent is 16 Age of consent is 17 Age of consent is 18

In the United States, each state and territory sets the age of consent either by statute or the common law applies, and there are several federal statutes related to protecting minors from sexual predators. Depending on the jurisdiction, the legal age of consent (that is, the age at which one can consent to anyone older) is between 16 and 18. Many states also include close-in-age exemptions, which legalize sexual activity involving those under the age of consent, when both partners are close-in-age. In some places, civil and criminal laws within the same state conflict with each other.

== Summary ==
- Restricted by age difference: younger partner is deemed able to consent to having sex with an older one as long as their age difference does not exceed a specified amount. This column shows the younger partner's age of consent under these rules, not the age difference.
- Restricted by authority: younger partner is deemed able to consent to having sex with any older partner, so long as said older partner is not in a legally recognised position of trust or authority, which the latter is abusing over the former.
- Unrestricted: age from which one is deemed able to consent to having sex with anyone else at or above the age of consent or the marriageable age if they must be married.

Ages of consent in the United States
State/territory	By age	By authority	Unrestricted	Ref.
§ Alabama	—N/a	16	19	
§ Alaska	—N/a	—N/a	18	
§ American Samoa	—N/a	—N/a	16	
§ Arizona	—N/a	—N/a	18	
§ Arkansas	14	16	18	
§ California	—N/a	—N/a	18	
§ Colorado	14	—N/a	17	
§ Connecticut	13	16	18	
§ Delaware	16	—N/a	18	
§ Florida	16	—N/a	18	
§ Georgia	—N/a	—N/a	16	
§ Hawaii	14	—N/a	16	
§ Idaho	—N/a	—N/a	18	
§ Illinois	—N/a	17	18	
§ Indiana	14	—N/a	16	
§ Iowa	14	16	—N/a	
§ Kansas	14	—N/a	16	
§ Kentucky	16	—N/a	18	
§ Louisiana	—N/a	—N/a	17	
§ Maine	14	—N/a	16	
§ Maryland	14	16	18	
§ Massachusetts	—N/a	—N/a	16	
§ Michigan	—N/a	16	—N/a	
§ Minnesota	13	16	—N/a	
§ Mississippi	—N/a	—N/a	16	
§ Missouri	14	—N/a	17	
§ Montana	—N/a	—N/a	16	
§ Nebraska	—N/a	—N/a	16	
§ Nevada	—N/a	—N/a	16	
§ New Hampshire	13	16	18	
§ New Jersey	13	16	18	
§ New Mexico	13	16	18	
§ New York	—N/a	—N/a	17	
§ North Carolina	13	—N/a	16	
§ North Dakota	15	—N/a	18	
§ Northern Mariana Islands	13	16	18	
§ Ohio	13	16	18	
§ Oklahoma	16	18	20	
§ Oregon	—N/a	—N/a	18	
§ Pennsylvania	13	16	18	
§ Puerto Rico	—N/a	—N/a	16	
§ Rhode Island	14	—N/a	16	
§ South Carolina	14	—N/a	16	
§ South Dakota	—N/a	—N/a	16	
§ Tennessee	13	—N/a	18	
§ Texas	—N/a	17	18	
§ United States Virgin Islands	13	—N/a	18	
§ Utah	16	—N/a	18	
§ Vermont	15	16	18	
§ Virginia	15	—N/a	18	
§ Washington	—N/a	16	21	
§ Washington, D.C.	—N/a	16	18	
§ West Virginia	—N/a	—N/a	16	
§ Wisconsin	—N/a	18	—N/a	
§ Wyoming	—N/a	—N/a	17	

== History ==
While the unrestricted age of consent is between 16 and 21 in all U.S. states, the laws have widely varied across the country in the past. In 1880, the ages of consent were set at 10 or 12 in most states, with the exception of Delaware where it was seven. The ages of consent were raised across the U.S. during the late 19th century and the early 20th century. By 1920, 26 states had an age of consent at 16, 21 states had an age of consent at 18, and one state (Georgia) had an age of consent at 14. Small adjustments to these laws occurred after 1920. The last two states to raise their age of general consent from under 16 to 16 or higher were Georgia, which raised the age of consent from 14 to 16 in 1995, and Hawaii, which changed it from 14 to 16 in 2001.

Age-of-consent laws historically only applied when a female was younger than her male partner. By 2015, ages of consent were gender independent. Until the late 20th century many states had provisions requiring that the teenage girl must be of "chaste character" in order for the sexual conduct to be considered criminal. In 1998, Mississippi became the last state to remove the chastity provision from its code.

The laws were designed to prosecute persons much older than their victims rather than teenagers close in age; therefore prosecutors rarely pursued teenagers in relationships with other teenagers even though some laws made close-in-age teenage relationships illegal. After the 1995 Landry and Forrest study concluded that men aged 20 and older produced half of the teenage pregnancies of girls between 15 and 17, states began to more stringently enforce age-of-consent laws to combat teenage pregnancy in addition to preventing adults from taking advantage of minors.

A backlash among the public occurred when some teenagers engaging in close-in-age relationships received punishments perceived by the public to be disproportionate, and thus age-gap provisions were added to reduce or eliminate penalties if the two parties are close in age. Brittany Logino Smith and Glen A. Kercher of the Criminal Justice Center of Sam Houston State University wrote that these laws are often referred to as "Romeo and Juliet laws", though they defined Romeo and Juliet as only referring to an affirmative defense against prosecution. Previously some of these statutes only applied to heterosexual sex, leaving homosexual sex in the same age range open to prosecution.

On June 26, 2003, both heterosexual and homosexual sodomy became legal (between non-commercial, consenting adults in private) in all U.S. states, District of Columbia, and territories, under the U.S. Supreme Court decision Lawrence v. Texas. In State v. Limon (2005), the Kansas Supreme Court used Lawrence as a precedent to overturn the state's "Romeo and Juliet" law, which prescribed lesser penalties for heterosexual than homosexual acts of similar age of consent-related offenses.

Since 2005, states have been enacting Jessica's Law statutes, which provide for lengthy penalties (often a mandatory minimum sentence of 25 years in prison and lifetime electronic monitoring) for the most aggravated forms of child sexual abuse (usually of a child under age 12).

== Federal laws ==
{Chapter 117, 18 U.S.C. 2422(b)} forbids the use of the United States Postal Service or other interstate or foreign means of communication, such as telephone calls or use of the internet, to persuade or entice a minor (defined as under 18 throughout the chapter) to be involved in a criminal sexual act. The act has to be illegal under state or federal law to be charged with a crime under 2422(b), and can even be applied to situations where both parties reside within the same state but use an instant messenger program whose servers are located in another state.

{Chapter 117, 18 U.S.C. 2423(a)} forbids transporting a minor (defined as under 18) in interstate or foreign commerce with the intent of engaging in criminal sexual acts in which a person can be charged. This subsection is ambiguous on its face and seems to apply only when the minor is transported across state or international lines to a place where the conduct is already illegal to begin with. The United States Department of Justice seems to agree with this interpretation.

{Chapter 117, 18 U.S.C. 2423(b)} forbids traveling in interstate or foreign commerce to engage in "illicit sexual conduct" with a minor; this is considered one form of sexual tourism. 2423(f) refers to Chapter 109A as its bright line for defining "illicit sexual conduct" as far as non-commercial sexual activity is concerned. For the purposes of age of consent, the only provision applicable is {Chapter 109A, 18 U.S.C. 2243(a)}. 2243(a) refers to situations where such younger person is under the age of 16 years, has attained 12 years of age, and the older person is more than four years older than the 12-to-15-year-old (children under 12 are handled under 18 U.S.C. 2241(c) under aggravated sexual abuse). So, the age is 12 years if one is within four years of the 12-to-15-year-old's age, 16 under all other circumstances. This law is also extraterritorial in nature to U.S. citizens and residents who travel outside of the United States.

Although legislation tends to reflect general societal attitudes regarding male versus female ages of consent, Richard Posner notes in his Guide to America's Sex Laws:

The U.S. Supreme Court has held that stricter rules for males do not violate the equal protection clause of the Constitution, on the theory that men lack the disincentives (associated with pregnancy) that women have, to engage in sexual activity, and the law may thus provide men with those disincentives in the form of criminal sanctions.

The Assimilative Crimes Act (18 U.S.C. § 13) incorporates local state criminal law when on federal reservations such as Bureau of Land Management property, military posts and shipyards, national parks, national forests, inter alia. Consequently, if an act is not punishable under any federal law (such as 18 U.S.C. 2243(a) mentioned above) then the local state's age-of-consent laws would apply to the crime.

The Protect Act § 503 of 1992 (codified at 18 U.S.C. § 2251 to 18 U.S.C. § 2260) makes it a federal crime to possess or create sexually explicit images of any person under 18 years of age regardless of consent. The non-commercial possession of an explicit picture or video clip of the person under the age of eighteen (such as a cell phone photograph of a naked sexual partner who is under the age of 18, or a picture of the photographer if they are under 18) may still constitute a serious federal child pornography felony. The sentence for a first time offender convicted of producing child pornography under 18 U.S.C. § 2251 (such as taking a suggestive cell phone picture of an otherwise legal sexual partner under the age of 18 without an intent to share or sell the picture), face fines and a statutory minimum of 15 years to 30 years maximum in prison. While mandatory minimum offenses do not apply to mere possession of child pornography, it is almost always the case that a person in possession of child pornography is also necessarily guilty of either receipt of child pornography, which carries a five-year mandatory minimum sentence, or production of child pornography, which carries a fifteen-year mandatory minimum sentence.

However, in Esquivel-Quintana v. Sessions, the Supreme Court held that in the context of statutory rape offenses that criminalize sexual intercourse based solely on the ages of the participants, the generic federal definition of "sexual abuse of a minor" requires the age of the victim to be less than 16.

=== Rules for U.S. military ===
Article 120b of the Uniform Code of Military Justice (10 U.S.C. § 920b), to which essentially only members of the United States Armed Services and enemy prisoners of war are subject, defines the age of consent as 16 years but allows an exemption for people who are married to minors 12–15 years old. There is also a mistake-in-age defense if the minor is over 12, but not if the minor is under 12. Within the United States, service members are subject to both the UCMJ and the applicable state law when "off-post". (Note: Local state law is incorporated, for the most part, into federal law when on-post per the Assimilative Crimes Act (18 U.S.C. § 13)) Depending upon the relevant status of forces agreement, United States service members are also subject to the local criminal laws of the host nation for acts committed off-post.

=== Washington, D.C. ===
The age of consent in Washington, D.C. (formally called the District of Columbia) is 16 with a close-in-age exemption for those within four years of age. However, sexual relations between people 18 or older and people under 18 are illegal if they are in a "significant relationship". According to the Code of the District of Columbia, a relationship is considered "significant" if one of the partners is:

- "A parent, sibling, aunt, uncle, or grandparent, whether related by blood, marriage, domestic partnership, or adoption"
- "A legal or de facto guardian or any person, more than 4 years older than the victim, who resides intermittently or permanently in the same dwelling as the victim"
- "The person or the spouse, domestic partner, or paramour of the person who is charged with any duty or responsibility for the health, welfare, or supervision of the victim at the time of the act"
- "Any employee or volunteer of a school, church, synagogue, mosque, or other religious institution, or an educational, social, recreational, athletic, musical, charitable, or youth facility, organization, or program, including a teacher, coach, counselor, clergy, youth leader, chorus director, bus driver, administrator, or support staff, or any other person in a position of trust with or authority over a child or a minor."

== State laws ==
Each U.S. state has its own general age of consent. As of August 1, 2018, the age of consent in each state in the United States is either 16 years of age, 17 years of age, or 18 years of age. The most common age of consent is 16, which is a common age of consent in most other Western countries.

- States where the age of consent is 16 (29): Alabama, Arkansas, Connecticut, Georgia, Hawaii, Indiana, Iowa, Kansas, Maine, Maryland, Massachusetts, Michigan, Minnesota, Mississippi, Montana, Nebraska, Nevada, New Hampshire, New Jersey, New Mexico, North Carolina, Ohio, (Note: Laws against "contributing to the unruliness or delinquency of a child" (§ 2919.24) and "interference with custody" (§ 2919.23) may be used against those who are 18 and older who have sex with those who are 16 and 17 if a parent or guardian complains. - See the section about Ohio for further information) Pennsylvania, (Note: Even though a person may legally consent to sexual activity with someone of any age older than him/her once he/she turns 16, Pennsylvania state prosecutors may still charge a person 18 or older with corruption of a minor, a misdemeanor offense, if a person has consensual sexual intercourse with a 16 or 17 year old – See the section about Pennsylvania for further information) Rhode Island, South Carolina, South Dakota, Vermont, Washington, and West Virginia.
- States where the age of consent is 17 (7): Colorado, Illinois, Louisiana, Missouri, New York, Texas, and Wyoming.
- States where the age of consent is 18 (14): Alaska, Arizona, California, Delaware, Florida, Idaho, Kentucky, North Dakota, Oklahoma, Oregon, Tennessee, Utah, Virginia, and Wisconsin.

These state laws are discussed in detail below. Most of these state laws refer to statutory rape using names other than "statutory rape" in particular. Such laws may refer to: "carnal knowledge of a minor", "child molestation", "corruption of a minor", "sexual misconduct", or "unlawful carnal knowledge". The laws of Georgia, Missouri, North Carolina, Mississippi, and Tennessee specifically refer to "statutory rape", with each state defining it differently. Nevada criminalizes "statutory sexual seduction" while Pennsylvania criminalizes "statutory sexual assault".

In most states there is not a single age in which a person may consent, but rather consent varies depending upon the minimum age of the younger party, the minimum age of the older party, or the differences in age. Some states have a single age of consent. Thirty U.S. states have age gap laws which make sexual activity legal if the ages of both participants are close to one another, and these laws are often referred to as "Romeo and Juliet laws". Other states have measures which reduce penalties if the two parties are close in age, and others provide an affirmative defense if the two parties are close in age. Even though state laws regarding the general age of consent and age gap laws differ, it is common for people in the United States to assume that sexual activity with someone under 18 is statutory rape.

In 2011, Smith and Kercher wrote, "Because of the large number of potential statutory rape cases, it is said that many jurisdictions will "pick and choose" which cases they want to investigate and prosecute." In some states, it is common to only prosecute the male in events where both parties in a heterosexual relationship are below the age of consent. Smith and Kercher wrote that there had been "large inconsistencies" among the decisions of prosecution and sentencing of these cases, and there had been accusations that minority males who have sex with minority girls resulting in pregnancy or who have sex with white girls have faced the brunt of enforcement.

=== Alabama ===
The age of consent in Alabama is 16. See Rape law in Alabama. From the articles of the Code of Alabama:

13A-6-70:

"(c) A person is deemed incapable of consent if he is: (1) Less than 16 years old..."

13A-6-67:

"(a) A person commits the crime of sexual abuse in the second degree if: ...
(2) He, being 19 years old or older, subjects another person to sexual contact who is less than 16 years old, but more than 12 years old."

13A-6-62:

"(a) A person commits the crime of rape in the second degree if:...
(1) Being 16 years old or older, he or she engages in sexual intercourse with a member of the opposite sex less than 16 and more than 12 years old; provided, however, the actor is at least two years older than the member of the opposite sex."

13A-6-63:

"(a) A person commits the crime of sodomy in the first degree if he or she:...
(3) Being 16 years old or older, engages in sodomy with a person who is less than 12 years old."

13A-6-64:

"(a) A person commits the crime of sodomy in the second degree if, being 16 years old or older, he or she engages in sodomy with another person 12 years old or older, but less than 16 years old; provided, however, the actor is at least two years older than the other person."

The State Legislature passed Act 2010-497 making it a crime for any school employee to have any sexual relations with a student under the age of 19. A school employee includes a teacher, school administrator, student teacher, safety or resource officer, coach, and other school employee. Age of the student and consent is not a defense. So thus, the age of consent of 16 cannot be used.

13A-6-81:

"A person commits the crime of a school employee engaging in a sex act or deviant sexual intercourse with a student under the age of 19 years if:

(a) He or she is a school employee and engages in a sex act or deviant sexual intercourse with a student, regardless of whether the student is male or female. Consent is not a defense to a charge under this section.
(b) As used in this section, sex act means sexual intercourse with any penetration, however slight; emission is not required.
(c) As used in this section, deviant sexual intercourse means any act of sexual gratification between persons not married to each other involving the sex organs of one person and the mouth or anus of another."
(d) The crime of a school employee engaging in a sex act or deviant sexual intercourse with a student is a Class B felony."

13A-6-82:

"A person commits the crime of a school employee having sexual contact with a student under the age of 19 years if:

(a) He or she is a school employee and engaging in sexual contact with a student, regardless of whether the student is male or female. Consent is not a defense to a charge under this section.
(b) As used in this section, sexual contact means any touching of the sexual or other intimate parts of a student, done for the purpose of gratifying the sexual desire of either party. The term includes soliciting or harassing a student to perform a sex act.
(c) The crime of a school employee having sexual contact with a student is a Class A misdemeanor."

Any individual convicted of these offenses, regardless if they received prison time or not, will have to register as a Sex Offender for the remainder of their life.

There was also a law which prohibited K-12 teachers from having sex with students under age 19, and violators could face prison time or get on the sex offender registry. In 2017, Alabama Circuit Judge Glenn Thompson, of Morgan County in the north of the state, ruled that this law was unconstitutional.

=== Alaska ===
The age of consent is 16, provided the older partner is not in a position of authority.

Alaska Statutes – Title 11. Criminal Law – Chapter 41. Offenses Against the Person – Sexual Abuse of a Minor
Section 436 in the First Degree (Unclassified Felony); Section 436 in the Second Degree (Class B Felony);
Section 438 in the Third Degree (Class C Felony); Section 440 : in the Fourth Degree (Class A misdemeanor)

AS 11.41.436. Sexual Abuse of a Minor in the Second Degree.

(a) An offender commits the crime of sexual abuse of a minor in the second degree if,

(1) being 17 years of age or older, the offender engages in sexual penetration with a person who is 13, 14, or 15 years of age and at least four years younger than the offender, or aids, induces, causes, or encourages a person who is 13, 14, or 15 years of age and at least four years younger than the offender to engage in sexual penetration with another person...

Sexual Abuse of a Minor in the ... :

- Younger minor under 13 + Elder minor under 16 (more than 3 years between them) :
  - Sexual contact = 4th Degree & Sexual penetration = 2nd Degree
- Younger minor under 13 + Elder minor above 16 :
  - pornography = 2nd Degree (younger under 16 vs. elder above 16 )
  - Sexual contact = 2nd Degree (for elder minor oneself or if (s)he helps another person)
  - Sexual penetration = 1st Degree (for elder minor oneself or if (s)he helps another person)
- Younger minor aged 13, 14 or 15 + Elder minor above 17 (more than 4 years between them) :
  - Sexual contact = 3rd Degree
  - Sexual penetration = 2nd Degree (for elder minor oneself or if (s)he helps another person)
  - pornography = 2nd Degree (younger under 16 vs. elder above 16 )
- Minor under 16 + partner above 18 (civil majority) if cohabitant with authority or position of authority :
  - Sexual contact = 2nd Degree & Sexual penetration = 1st Degree.
- Minor under 18 + parent or guardian above 18 :
  - Sexual contact = 2nd Degree & Sexual penetration = 1st Degree

Indecent Exposure:

  - with masturbation, in front of minor under 16 = Indecent Exposure in the 1st Degree (Class C Felony)
  - simply, in front of minor under 16 = Indecent Exposure in the 2nd Degree (Class A misdemeanor)
  - simply, in front of above 16 = Indecent Exposure in the 2nd Degree (Class B misdemeanor).

=== Arizona ===
The age of consent in Arizona is 18. However, there exist in the legislation defenses to prosecution if the defendant is close-in-age to the minor or a spouse of the minor. Note: these are not close-in-age exceptions but defenses in court. Arizona Revised Statute 13-1405(A)

(Defenses)

- B. It is a defense to a prosecution pursuant to sections 13-1404 and 13–1405 in which the minor's lack of consent is based on incapacity to consent because the minor was fifteen, sixteen or seventeen years of age if at the time the defendant engaged in the conduct constituting the offense the defendant did not know and could not reasonably have known the age of the minor.
- D. It is a defense to a prosecution pursuant to section 13-1404 or 13-1405 that the person was the spouse (legally married AND cohabiting) of the other person at the time of commission of the act ...
- F. It is a defense to a prosecution pursuant to section 13-1405 if the minor is fifteen, sixteen or seventeen years of age, the defendant is under nineteen years of age or attending high school and is no more than twenty-four months older than the minor and the conduct is consensual.

=== Arkansas ===
The age of consent is 16, with some close-in-age exemptions.

Details: The minimum age is 16 for anyone age 20 or older. Under 20, the younger person must not be less than 14. However, there exists a "sexual indecency with a child" law that prohibits any person over age 18 from soliciting sexual activity from anyone under 15 (or believed to be under 15). This means that while sexual activity between a 14-year-old and an 18- or 19-year-old may be legal in and of itself, soliciting it could still be charged as a class D felony.

Sexual penetration (intercourse or "deviate sexual activity") between a major (18+) and a minor under 14 is a rape, punishable by a minimum 25-year sentence. Under 18, there is a defense for sexual contact if the younger (<14) minor is not more than 4 years younger if 12 or above, or not more than 3 years younger if under 12. For acts involving penetration, the exception is 3 years for all ages below 14.

Title 5 – Criminal Offenses. Subtitle 2 – Offenses Against The Person. Chapter 14 – Sexual Offenses. Subchapter 1 – General Provisions.

§ 5-14-103 – Rape.

- (a) A person commits rape if he or she engages in sexual intercourse or deviate sexual activity with another person:
  - (1) By forcible compulsion;
  - (2) Who is incapable of consent because he or she is:
    - (A) Physically helpless;
    - (B) Mentally defective; or
    - (C) Mentally incapacitated;
  - (3) (A) Who is less than fourteen (14) years of age.
    - (B) It is an affirmative defense to a prosecution under subdivision (a)(3)(A) of this section that the actor was not more than three (3) years older than the victim; or
  - (4)
    - (A) Who is a minor and the actor is the victim's:
      - (i) Guardian;
      - (ii) Uncle, aunt, grandparent, step-grandparent, or grandparent by adoption;
      - (iii) Brother or sister of the whole or half blood or by adoption; or
      - (iv) Nephew, niece, or first cousin.
    - (B) It is an affirmative defense to a prosecution under subdivision (a)(4)(A) of this section that the actor was not more than three (3) years older than the victim.
- (b) It is no defense to a prosecution under subdivisions (a)(3) or (4) of this section that the victim consented to the conduct.
- (c) (1) Rape is a Class Y felony.
  - (2) Any person who pleads guilty or nolo contendere to or is found guilty of rape involving a victim who is less than fourteen (14) years of age shall be sentenced to a minimum term of imprisonment of twenty-five (25) years.
- (d)
  - (1) A court may issue a permanent no contact order when:
    - (A) A defendant pleads guilty or nolo contendere; or
    - (B) All of the defendant's appeals have been exhausted and the defendant remains convicted.
  - (2) If a judicial officer has reason to believe that mental disease or defect of the defendant will or has become an issue in the case, the judicial officer shall enter such orders as are consistent with § 5-2-305.

§ 5-14-126 – Sexual assault in the third degree.

- (a) A person commits sexual assault in the third degree if the person:
  - (1) Engages in sexual intercourse or deviate sexual activity with another person who is not the actor's spouse, and the actor is:
    - (A) Employed with the Department of Correction, Department of Community Correction, Department of Human Services, or any city or county jail, and the victim is in the custody of the Department of Correction, Department of Community Correction, Department of Human Services, or any city or county jail;
    - (B) Employed or contracted with or otherwise providing services, supplies, or supervision to an agency maintaining custody of inmates, detainees, or juveniles, and the victim is in the custody of the Department of Correction, Department of Community Correction, Department of Human Services, or any city or county jail; or
    - (C) A mandated reporter under 12-18-402(b) or a member of the clergy and is in a position of trust or authority over the victim and uses the position of trust or authority to engage in sexual intercourse or deviate sexual activity; or
  - (2)
    - (A) Being a minor, engages in sexual intercourse or deviate sexual activity with another person who is:
      - (i) Less than fourteen (14) years of age; and
      - (ii) Not the person's spouse.
  - (B) It is an affirmative defense under this subdivision (a)(2) that the actor was not more than three (3) years older than the victim.
- (b) It is no defense to a prosecution under this section that the victim consented to the conduct.
- (c) Sexual assault in the third degree is a Class C felony.

§ 5-14-127 – Sexual assault in the fourth degree.

- (a) A person commits sexual assault in the fourth degree if the person:
  - (1) Being twenty (20) years of age or older:
    - (A) Engages in sexual intercourse or deviate sexual activity with another person who is:
      - (i) Less than sixteen (16) years of age; and
      - (ii) Not the person's spouse; or
    - (B) Engages in sexual contact with another person who is:
      - (i) Less than sixteen (16) years of age; and
      - (ii) Not the person's spouse; or
  - (2) Engages in sexual contact with another person who is not the actor's spouse, and the actor is employed with the Department of Correction, Department of Community Correction, Department of Human Services, or any city or county jail, and the victim is in the custody of the Department of Correction, Department of Community Correction, Department of Human Services, or a city or county jail.
- (b) (1) Sexual assault in the fourth degree under subdivisions (a)(1)(A) and (a)(2) of this section is a Class D felony.
  - (2) Sexual assault in the fourth degree under subdivision (a)(1)(B) of this section is a Class A misdemeanor if the person engages only in sexual contact with another person as described in subdivision (a)(1)(B) of this section.

§ 5-14-110 Sexual Indecency With a Child.

- (a) A person commits sexual indecency with a child if:

(1) Being eighteen (18) years of age or older, the person solicits another person who is less than fifteen (15) years of age or who is represented to be less than fifteen (15) years of age to engage in: (A) Sexual intercourse; (B) Deviate sexual activity; or (C) Sexual contact;

Title 9 - Family Law. Subtitle 3 - Minors. Chapter 27 - Juvenile Courts And Proceedings. Subchapter 3 - Arkansas Juvenile Code § 9-27-303:

(51) "Sexual abuse" means:

- (A) By a person ten (10) years of age or older to a person younger than eighteen (18) years of age:
  - (i) Sexual intercourse, deviant sexual activity, or sexual contact by forcible compulsion;
  - (ii) Attempted sexual intercourse or deviant sexual activity or sexual contact by forcible compulsion;
  - (iii) Indecent exposure; or
  - (iv) Forcing the watching of pornography or live human sexual activity;
- (B) By a person eighteen (18) years of age or older to a person who is younger than sixteen (16) years of age and is not his or her spouse:
  - (i) Sexual intercourse, deviant sexual activity, or sexual contact; or
  - (ii) Attempted sexual intercourse, deviant sexual activity, or sexual contact;
- (C) By a caretaker to a person younger than eighteen (18) years of age:
  - (i) Sexual intercourse, deviant sexual activity, or sexual contact; or
  - (ii) Attempted sexual intercourse, deviant sexual activity, or sexual contact;
  - (iii) Forcing or encouraging the watching of pornography;
  - (iv) Forcing, permitting, or encouraging the watching of live sexual activity;
  - (v) Forcing listening to a phone sex line; or
  - (vi) An act of voyeurism;
- (D) By a person younger than ten (10) years of age to a person younger than eighteen (18) years of age:
  - (i) Sexual intercourse, deviant sexual activity, or sexual contact by forcible compulsion; or
  - (ii) Attempted sexual intercourse, deviant sexual activity, or sexual contact by forcible compulsion;

(52)

- (A) "Sexual contact" means any act of sexual gratification involving;
  - (i) Touching, directly or through clothing, of the sex organs, buttocks, or anus of a juvenile or the breast of a female juvenile;
  - (ii) Encouraging the juvenile to touch the offender in a sexual manner; or
  - (iii) Requesting the offender to touch the juvenile in a sexual manner.
- (B) Evidence of sexual gratification may be inferred from the attendant circumstances surrounding the investigation of the specific complaint of child maltreatment.
- (C) This section shall not permit normal, affectionate hugging to be construed as sexual contact;

=== California ===
The age of consent in California is 18.

In California, there is a crime of "unlawful sexual intercourse", which is an act of sexual intercourse with a person under the age of 18 who is not the spouse of the person. As per the text of the statute, all sexual activity with a person under the age of 18 (and not their spouse) is a criminal offense. Even if two 17-year-olds willingly have sex with each other, both have committed a crime, although it is only a misdemeanor.

The punishment is varied, depending on the ages of the perpetrator and the victim, and there are more severe penalties if there is a wider gap between the age of the perpetrator and the age of the victim:

- Any person who commits the crime with a minor not more than 3 years younger or older than the perpetrator is guilty of a misdemeanor.
- Any person who commits the crime with a minor who is more than 3 years younger than the perpetrator is guilty of a misdemeanor or a felony. A misdemeanor conviction is punished by imprisonment in a county jail not exceeding one year. A felony conviction is punished by imprisonment in a county jail for 16 months, or two or three years, or in the state prison, depending on the person's criminal history.
- Any person 21 years of age or older who commits the crime with a minor under 16 years of age is guilty of a misdemeanor or a felony. A misdemeanor conviction is punished by imprisonment in a county jail not exceeding one year. A felony conviction is punished by imprisonment in a county jail for two, three or four years, or in the state prison, depending on the person's criminal history.

There are also civil sanctions possible for a violation stated above.

There are separate crimes for committing sodomy with minors.

There are separate crimes for committing any lewd or lascivious act with a person under the age of 14.

==== History of California laws ====
The age of consent, at the time applying only when the girl is the younger party, was 10 when California introduced its penal code in 1850. In 1889, the age of consent was raised to 14. In 1897 the age of consent became 16. The age of consent in California has been 18 since 1913. Some media sources reported that the age of consent in California in the 1970s was 14 or 16 but in fact it was and has been 18.

In the 1990s Governor of California Pete Wilson stated that there was a trend of men in their mid-to-late 20s having sex with and impregnating teenage girls around 14 years of age and that the statutory rape laws needed to be enforced to prevent this.

In 2012 Kristin Olsen, a Republican member of the State Assembly of California, sponsored a bill that criminalizes sexual relations between K-12 teachers and students, including students over 18, as well as sexual text messages and other communications aimed at seducing a student. The bill was proposed after a 41-year-old teacher and 18-year-old high school student publicly announced that they were in a relationship. The bill was killed in committee by Democratic lawmakers concerned about the constitutionality of the proposed legislation.

By 2014, several civil court cases in California, where the older partner or their employer were sued for their actions, have ruled against the minor under the reasoning that "in some cases at least, a minor may be capable of giving consent to sexual relations," even when the older partner was still convicted under the criminal law. These civil rulings remain controversial.

=== Colorado ===
The age of consent in Colorado is 17; however, there exists in the legislation close-in-age exceptions, which allow those aged 15 and 16 to engage in acts with those less than ten years older and those less than 15 to engage in acts with those less than four years older. A 17-year-old may not, however, consent to sex with a person who is in a position of trust with respect to the person under the age of eighteen. C.R.S. 18-3-405.3.

C.R.S. 18-3-402(1) Any actor who knowingly inflicts sexual intrusion or sexual penetration on a victim commits sexual assault if: ... (d) At the time of the commission of the act, the victim is less than fifteen years of age and the actor is at least four years older than the victim and is not the spouse of the victim; or (e) At the time of the commission of the act, the victim is at least fifteen years of age but less than seventeen years of age and the actor is at least ten years older than the victim and is not the spouse of the victim;

Notwithstanding the age of consent, however, for purposes of child prostitution offenses in Colorado, a "child" means a person under the age of eighteen years. C.R.S. 18-7-401(2). Reasonable mistake of age, or similarity in age, is not a defense to these offenses. C.R.S. 18-7-407. All child prostitution offenses are class three felonies (class one felonies are punishable by life without parole, class two felonies include second degree murder). So, while it is not a crime for a 17-year-old to have non-commercial sex with a 60-year-old in Colorado, it is a serious crime punishable by four to twelve years in prison for an 18-year-old to engage in any sexual act, or to present at a "place of prostitution" with an intent do so, for money or any other thing of value with a seventeen-year-old with the reasonable belief that the minor was under eighteen years old. C.R.S. 18-7-406. The same conduct, entered into with an eighteen-year-old and without a belief that the prostitute was under eighteen years of age, would be a misdemeanor. C.R.S. 18-7-205. Those under the age of eighteen are also children for the crime of inducing or coercing someone to have sex or to have sexual conduct with another for the voyeur's gratification, or to expose themselves to another for the voyeur's sexual gratification, C.R.S. 18-3-404(1.5), and the crime of trafficking in children, C.R.S. 18-3-502.

There is a marriage exception to both Colorado's statutory rape law, C.R.S. 18-3-402, the crime of sexual assault upon a child by a person in a position of trust, C.R.S. 18-3-405.3, and Colorado's child prostitution laws. However, while Colorado law does recognize common law marriages entered into when both spouses are eighteen years of age or older, it does not recognize common law marriages entered into in Colorado or elsewhere after September 1, 2006, when one spouse is under eighteen years of age. C.R.S. 14-2-109.5.

=== Connecticut ===
The general age of consent in Connecticut is 16. This applies in most relationships.

However, if any of the following apply, then the age of consent becomes 18:

- Where one person is a guardian, or responsible for the general supervision, of the other. See C.G.S. § 53a-71(a)(4).
- Where one person is an athletic coach or an intensive instructor (e.g. piano teacher) outside of a school setting, and the other is being coached or instructed. See C.G.S. § 53a-71(9)(B).
- Where one person's professional, legal, occupational or volunteer status gives them a role of supervision, power, or authority, over the other's participation in a program or activity, and the older person is at least 20 years old. See C.G.S. § 53a-71(a)(4).

Connecticut recognizes that minors who are at least 13 can consent to sexual activity if (and only if) there is less than a 3-year age difference. For example:

- A 13-year-old can consent to any 15-year-old.
- A 14-year-old can consent to any 16-year-old.
- A 15-year-old can consent to any 17-year-old.
- A 14-year-old born on January 1 can consent to a 17-year-old born on February 1 as there is a 2-year-and-11-month difference, just under the 3-year difference.

However consensual, sexual intercourse within the 3-year age difference by a minor 13 through 17 years old may, upon a complaint, lead the Connecticut Superior Court to a "family with service needs" finding. See C.G.S. § 46b-120(7)(E). Such a finding would allow the Court to issue orders as it finds necessary in dealing with the matter.

Consensual sexual intercourse over the 3-year age difference (where the minor is 13 to 15 years old) would subject the older party to a charge of Sexual Assault, 2nd Degree, in violation of C.G.S. § 53a-71(a)(1). Any juvenile offender 14 years old or older has the case automatically transferred to the regular criminal docket of the Superior Court by operation of law, and thus stands before the court to be tried as an adult. See C.G.S. § 46b-127(a). A guilty verdict would result in conviction of a Class B felony sex offense, with a mandatory minimum of 9 months and maximum 20 years imprisonment. It would not matter if the older person did not know of the age difference, or if the younger person lied about age. However, if the offender is 17 years old or younger, has a clean record, and such sexual activity was consensual, Youthful Offender status (a pre-trial diversionary program that seals the court record and results in a dismissal of charges) may be granted. See C.G.S. § 54-76b to o.

Previously the Connecticut age gap was two years, not three. By 2007 there had been a proposal to increase the gap to four years to reduce the number of close-in-age statutory rape cases being prosecuted, but three years was selected as a compromise.

Connecticut also recognizes that minors under 13 are released from criminal liability as to consensual sexual activity if (and only if) there is less than a 2-year age difference. For example:

- A 12-year-old can consent to any 13-year-old.
- A 12-year-old cannot consent to any 14-year-old.

Consensual (between minors) sexual intercourse over the 2-year age difference (where the minor is under 13 years old) would subject the older minor to a charge of Sexual Assault, 1st Degree, in violation of C.G.S. § 53a-70(a)(2). A guilty verdict would result in conviction of a Class A felony sex offense, with a mandatory minimum of 5–10 years and maximum 25 years imprisonment. Any juvenile offender 14 years old or older has the case automatically transferred to the regular criminal docket of the Superior Court by operation of law, and thus stands before the court to be tried as an adult. However, the offender would have the same chance to apply for Youthful Offender status (see Sexual Assault, 2nd Degree above) provided the criteria are met.

Despite the age gap exceptions for sexual assault charges, subsection 2 of Section 53-21 (Injury or risk of injury to, or impairing morals of, children) criminalizes anyone who "has contact with the intimate parts, as defined in section 53a-65, of a child under the age of sixteen years or subjects a child under sixteen years of age to contact with the intimate parts of such person, in a sexual and indecent manner likely to impair the health or morals of such child". This is a class B felony, and there is no close in age exception, nor is there a requirement that the actor be over 18 years of age.

A juvenile offender 13 years old and younger would be charged as a "serious juvenile offender" under C.G.S. § 46b-120(12)(A). Because the charge is a sex offense, the juvenile prosecutor can request that the proceeding designated a "serious sexual offender prosecution". See C.G.S. § 46b-133d(b)-(f). Unless the juvenile waives the right to a trial by jury, the case proceeds to the regular criminal docket of the Superior Court, where the juvenile must face trial as an adult. If the juvenile agrees to the waiver, the case will proceed through the juvenile system with a bench trial.

Links to Statutes Cited (in numerical order)

- C.G.S. § 46b-120
- C.G.S. § 46b-127
- C.G.S. § 46b-133d
- C.G.S. § 53a-70
- C.G.S. § 53a-71
- C.G.S. § 54-76b to o

=== Delaware ===
The age of consent in Delaware is 18, but it is legal for teenagers aged 16 and 17 to engage in sexual intercourse as long as the older partner is younger than 30.

Title 11 § 761. Definitions generally applicable to sexual offences. (j) A child who has not yet reached his or her sixteenth birthday is deemed unable to consent to a sexual act with a person more than 4 years older than said child. Children who have not yet reached their twelfth birthday are deemed unable to consent to a sexual act under any circumstances.

§ 770. Rape in the fourth degree; class C felony. (a) A person is guilty of rape in the fourth degree when the person: ... 2) Intentionally engages in sexual intercourse with another person, and the victim has not yet reached that victim's eighteenth birthday, and the person is 30 years of age or older, except that such intercourse shall not be unlawful if the victim and person are married at the time of such intercourse.

However, in 2009 Senate Bill 185 amended the text of article 768 from anyone under 16 years to anyone under 18 years.

§ 768 Unlawful sexual contact in the second degree; class F felony.

A person is guilty of unlawful sexual contact in the second degree when the person intentionally has sexual contact with another person who is less than 18 years of age or causes the victim to have sexual contact with the person or a third person

762(d)specifies a close-in-age "affirmative defense" for 12- to 15-year-olds.

(d) Teenage defendant. — As to sexual offenses in which the victim's age is an element of the offense because the victim has not yet reached that victim's sixteenth birthday, where the person committing the sexual act is no more than 4 years older than the victim, it is an affirmative defense that the victim consented to the act "knowingly" as defined in § 231 of this title. Sexual conduct pursuant to this section will not be a crime. This affirmative defense will not apply if the victim had not yet reached that victim's twelfth birthday at the time of the act.

It can reasonably be assumed that this defense would extend to 16- and 17-year-olds as well, but as the law is currently written it is unclear if 16- and 17-year-olds can freely consent with anyone under 30, or if charges may still apply under 768 (a class F felony) if they exceed the specified "4 year difference" affirmative defense.

=== Florida ===
The age of consent in Florida is 18, but close-in-age exemptions exist. By law, the exception permits a person 23 years of age or younger to engage in legal sexual activity with a minor aged 16 or 17.

794.05 Unlawful sexual activity with certain minors.-- (1) A person 24 years of age or older who engages in sexual activity with a person 16 or 17 years of age commits a felony of the second degree, punishable as provided in s. 775.082, s. 775.083, or s. 775.084. As used in this section, "sexual activity" means oral, anal, or vaginal penetration by, or union with, the sexual organ of another; however, sexual activity does not include an act done for a bona fide medical purpose.

It is illegal to have non-penetrative sexual contact with a person under 16, and there are no close-in-age exceptions. If the offender is 18+ it is a 2nd degree felony, and if the offender is under 18 it is a 3rd degree felony. It is a third degree felony for a person 24 or older to have non-penetrative sexual contact with a person 16 or 17 years of age.

A law passed in 2007, as amended, states that people convicted of certain sex crimes involving children may be removed from the sex offender list if they were no more than four years older than their victims, had only that offense on their records, and had victims aged 13–17.

=== Georgia ===
The age of consent in Georgia is 16 and there is no close-in-age exception, though the offenses are a misdemeanor rather than a felony in cases where the perpetrator is less than 19 years of age and is no more than 4 years older than the victim.

The crime of "statutory rape" makes it illegal for a perpetrator of any age to have sexual intercourse with someone under the age of 16 that they are not married to. This law specifies that a defendant cannot be convicted on the testimony of the victim alone; some other evidence must be present. This offense carries a minimum sentence of 1 year in prison, and a maximum of 20 years. If the offender is 21 years of age or older, the minimum is raised to 10 years in prison, and the offender is subject to sex offender sentencing guidelines. However, if the victim is 14 or 15 years old and the actor is age 18 or younger and within 4 years of the victim's age, the crime is reduced to a misdemeanor with a maximum sentence of 1 year in prison.

The crime "child molestation" makes it illegal for anyone to engage in "any immoral or indecent act to or in the presence of or with any child under the age of 16 years with the intent to arouse or satisfy the sexual desires of either the child or the person", as well as electronically transmit any depiction of such an act. It carries a minimum sentence of 5 years and a max of 20 years in prison for a first-time offender, as well as mandatory counseling and sex offender sentencing guidelines. For repeat offenders, the minimum 10 years and the maximum is life imprisonment. This crime has the same close-in-age exception as statutory rape stated above if the victim is 14 or 15 years old and the actor is 18 or younger and within 4 years of age.

A third applicable crime is "aggravated child molestation", which is any act of the previously mentioned child molestation that causes injuries to the victim, or involves an act of "sodomy" (defined under state law as any act of oral sex or anal sex). This crime carries a sentence of 25 years to life, and lifetime probation thereafter. However, if the victim is 13, 14 or 15 years old, the actor is 18 or younger and within 4 years of age, and the act committed was "sodomy" and did not cause injury, the crime is reduced to a misdemeanor. This exception was added after a landmark case, Wilson v. State of Georgia occurred in 2006 and caused lawmakers to think the statute should have a close-in-age exception. At the time because of the words of the law, a 17-year-old man was sentenced to 10 years in prison for having consensual oral sex with a 15-year-old girl.

In June 2005, a bill was proposed before the Georgia General Assembly to raise the age of consent from 16 to 18.

==== History of Georgia laws ====
Georgia was resistant to raising its age of consent in the Progressive Era. In 1894, the Georgia Supreme Court reversed the conviction of a man convicted of raping a 10-year-old girl because the age of consent in Georgia was 10 at the time. Nonetheless, the Court recommended raising the Georgia age of consent, saying "the age of consent in many States is higher than in this State, and should be made higher here; and a committee of ladies" is petitioning to do that.

As it turned out, Georgia's age of consent remained at 10 until 1918, when it was raised to 14. After the 1918 law changes, Georgia still had the lowest age of consent in the country, because all 47 other states had raised their ages of consent to 16 or 18. The Georgia age of consent remained at 14 until 1995, when a bill proposed by Steve Langford to make 16 the age of consent passed.

=== Hawaii ===
The age of consent in Hawaii is 16. There is a close-in-age exemption, which allows those aged 14 and 15 to consent to sex with those less than five years older.

- For more on age of consent in other territories in the Pacific Ocean, see: Ages of consent in Oceania#United States

In the 1990s the age of consent was 14, the lowest in the United States. Avery Chumbley, a member of the Hawaiian Senate, had made efforts to raise the age of consent since 1996. The age of consent was changed to 16 by Act 1, House Bill 236, passed by the Legislature of Hawaii in 2001.

Hawaii first established age of consent for contact/penetration as 10/14 years old in 1869 which lasted until 1912. The legal status from 1913 to 1924 is unclear, but by 1925 it was set to the higher numbers of 12/16. In both sets of laws these penalties only penalized males contacting females. In 1974 the laws were changed to add the additional requirement that there was a "reckless infliction" of "serious" bodily harm. This requirement was removed in 1986 and the wording was changed to apply to persons of any gender, not only males.

=== Idaho ===
The age of consent in Idaho is 18.

- If the victim is under the age of 16 and female, and the actor is male and age 18 or older, or if the female is age 16 or 17 and the male actor is at least 3 years older, any penetrative act (including intercourse, anal sex and oral sex) is considered Rape. Rape carries a minimum sentence of 1 year in prison, and a maximum of life.
- If the victim is under the age of 16, any lewd or lascivious act (including any form of genital contact) done by an actor "with the intent of arousing, appealing to, or gratifying the lust or passions or sexual desires of such person, such minor child, or third party" is Lewd Conduct With Minor Child Under Sixteen. This law does not discriminate by the gender of the victim nor actor, and notably provides no exceptions based on the parties being close-in-age.
- If the victim is age 16 or 17 and the actor is at least 5 years older, any lewd or lascivious act (including any form of genital contact) or any other form of sexual contact done by an actor "with the intent of arousing, appealing to, or gratifying the lust or passions or sexual desires of such person, such minor child, or third party" is Sexual Battery Of A Minor Child Sixteen Or Seventeen Years Of Age. Like Lewd Conduct above, this law does not discriminate by gender.
- If the victim is under the age of 16, and the actor is age 18 or older, any sexual contact not amounting to the aforementioned Lewd Conduct is classified as Sexual Abuse Of A Child Under The Age Of Sixteen Years.

=== Illinois ===
Age of consent in Illinois is 17, and rises to 18 with someone who has a position of authority or trust over the victim. There is no close-in-age exception, crossing the age boundary is Criminal Sexual Assault.

Any sexual contact of minors between the ages of 9 and 16 is Criminal sexual abuse. When the victim is younger than 9 and the perpetrator 13 to 16, the crime becomes Aggravated Criminal Sexual Assault; when the victim is younger than 13 and the perpetrator 17 or older, it becomes Predatory criminal sexual assault of a child. Sex with a victim with severe intellectual disability at any age, or with a family or household member under 18, is Aggravated criminal sexual abuse, though penetration upgrades it to Aggravated Criminal Sexual Assault.

Although Illinois' minimum marriage age (with parental consent or court order) is 16, there is no statutory exception to the age of sexual consent.

==== History of Illinois laws ====
Bill 1139 was introduced in 2011 to decriminalize sexual relationships between children 13–16 years old and those fewer than five years older, but the bill failed to pass.

In 2011 a bill was proposed that would allow people who violated the age of consent laws and were close in age with their victims to petition a judge to be removed from the sex offender registry. This bill, HB 1139, was, written by Republican Party state representative Robert Pritchard. An editorial in the Chicago Sun-Times argued in favor of the bill. Emily McAsey, a Democratic state representative from Lockport, stated opposition to the idea, citing that she was "troubled" by the idea of a romantic relationship between a 14-year-old and an 18-year-old. Republican state representative Dennis Reboletti of Elmhurst stated that he did not believe judges should be able to reverse decisions made by prosecutors. The bill passed the Illinois House Judiciary II Committee 4–3 in February 2011 and moved to the Illinois Senate.

By 2012 Democratic state senator William Haine of Alton sponsored Senate Bill 3359 which included a provision that a person who had sex with a minor between 13 and 17 while he/she was fewer than five years older may petition to be removed from the sex offender registry after serving 10 years. Haine stated that he did not want "Romeo and Juliet" offenders to be on the sex offender registry.

=== Indiana ===
The age of consent in Indiana is 16. A close-in-age exception allows minors 14–15 years of age to legally consent to sex with a partner who is less than 18 years old.

With regard to sex with children 14 or older, Indiana law states the following:

A person at least eighteen (18) years of age who, with a child at least fourteen (14) years of age but less than sixteen (16) years of age, performs or submits to sexual intercourse or other sexual conduct (as defined in IC 35-31.5-2-221.5) commits sexual misconduct with a minor, a Level 5 felony.

— Indiana Code 35-42-4-9

Under certain aggravating circumstances, the offense increases to a Class B felony or to a Class A felony. The law allows the actor a defense to prosecution if the victim is currently or was previously married (the absolute minimum marriageable age in Indiana is 16), although this defense does not apply in the case of violence, threats or drugs. The law also allows a defense if the actor is within 4 years of age of the younger person and the two were in an ongoing dating/romantic relationship. This is not a close-in-age exception though, but merely a defense in court. The law also allows a mistake of age defense if the actor reasonably believed the victim was 16 or older.

The age limit rises to 18, according to IC35-42-4-7, if the actor is an adult who is the guardian, adoptive parent, adoptive grandparent, custodian, or stepparent of the minor; or a child care worker for the minor; or a military recruiter who is attempting to enlist over the minor.

Any person who engages in sexual intercourse with a child under 14 years of age commits a Class B felony, under IC 35-42-4-3 Child molesting. Under certain aggravating circumstances, the crime becomes a Class A felony.

=== Iowa ===
The age of consent in Iowa is 16, with a close-in-age exemption for those aged 14 and 15, who may engage in sexual acts with partners less than 4 years older.

Section 709.4 states: A person commits sexual abuse in the third degree when the person performs a sex act under any of the following circumstances ... 2(c) The other person is fourteen or fifteen years of age and any of the following are true ... (4) The person is four or more years older than the other person.

Section 709.15 forbids, amongst other things, sexual contact between a school employee and a "... person who is currently enrolled in or attending a public or nonpublic elementary or secondary school, or who was a student enrolled in or who attended a public or nonpublic elementary or secondary school within thirty days of any violation ..." There exist similar laws for those who provide or purport to provide mental health services {§ 709.15}, officers in charge of offenders and juveniles {§ 709.16}.

=== Kansas ===
The age of consent in Kansas is 16. K.S.A. 21–5503, 21–5504, 21-5506 and 21-5507 prohibit sexual activity with minors aged 14 and 15. K.S.A. 21-5507 allows for a lesser penalty if the minor is 14 or 15 and the offender is under 19 years old. 21-5506 covers indecent liberties with a child and aggravated indecent liberties with a child. Aggravated indecent liberties with a child is sexual intercourse with a child who is 14 or more years of age but less than 16 years of age.

As per State v. Limon (2005) the previous Kansas age of consent law, which did not apply to homosexuals, was struck down by the Kansas Supreme Court due to 2003's Lawrence v. Texas decision.

=== Kentucky ===
The age of consent in Kentucky is 18. Consensual sex with persons at least age 16 but not yet 18 is permitted only if the actor is less than 10 years older than the younger party. Kentucky Revised Statutes (KRS) § 510.020 deems a person unable to consent if they are less than 16 years old, or if they are age 16 or 17 and the other party is at least 10 years older. (Prior to July 2018, consensual sex with a person at least age 16 was permissible regardless of the age difference.)

In addition to the basic law regarding consent, KRS has additional consent laws covering a variety of other situations:

- Under KRS § 510.110(1)(d), it is "sexual abuse in the first degree" for "a person in a position of authority or position of special trust" (as defined in KRS § 532.045, including but not limited to parents, stepparents, foster parents, teachers, coaches, corrections personnel, religious leaders, and employers) to:
  - engage in sexual conduct with a person under 18, if the minor came into contact with the adult as a result of the adult's special position,
  - masturbate in the presence of said person under 18, or
  - masturbate while communicating by telephone, Internet, or other electronic means with any person known by the adult to be under 16 (regardless of whether the actor's position brought them into contact with the minor), and the minor can see or hear the adult masturbate.
- Under KRS § 510.110(1)(c), the actions stated above (without the qualification of "position of authority ... or special trust") are also "sexual abuse in the first degree" when performed by anyone 21 or older if the other person is under 16.

Sexual abuse in the first degree is a Class D felony if the victim is 12 to 17 years old, and a Class C felony if the victim is under 12.

- Under KRS § 510.120, it is "sexual abuse in the second degree", a Class A misdemeanor, for:
  - a person at least 18 but under 21 to subject a person under age 16 to sexual conduct (§ 510.120(1)(b)), or
  - personnel of correctional, juvenile justice, and detention facilities to engage in sexual conduct with adults (at least 18) who are under the supervision of an included facility (§ 510.120(1)(c)).

However, KRS § 510.120(2) provides a defense to prosecutions under § 510.120(1)(b) (where the actor is between ages 18 and 21) for sexual abuse in the second degree if the victim is at least 14 and the actor is less than 5 years older. Similarly, it is a defense to the Class B misdemeanor of "sexual abuse in the third degree" (KRS § 510.130), defined as subjecting another person to non-consensual sex, if the lack of consent was due solely to incapacity by age, the victim is 14 or 15 years old, and the actor is under 18.

=== Louisiana ===
The age of consent in Louisiana is 17.

§ 80. Felony carnal knowledge of a juvenile

A. Felony carnal knowledge of a juvenile is committed when: (1) A person who is seventeen years of age or older has sexual intercourse, with consent, with a person who is thirteen years of age or older but less than seventeen years of age, when the victim is not the spouse of the offender and when the difference between the age of the victim and the age of the offender is four years or greater; or ...

=== Maine ===
The age of consent in Maine is 16. Teenagers aged 14 and 15 may engage in sexual intercourse with partners who are less than 5 years older.

§ 254. Sexual abuse of minors 1. A person is guilty of sexual abuse of a minor if: A. The person engages in a sexual act with another person, not the actor's spouse, who is either 14 or 15 years of age and the actor is at least 5 years older than the other person.

=== Maryland ===
The age of consent in Maryland is 16. (Note: An exception to the age of consent is that if a person in a "position of authority" (full-time, permanent employee) engages in any sexual contact with any minor under age 18 or victim specified above, that constitutes a sexual offense in the fourth degree.)

- If a victim is 14 or 15 and the offender at least 4 years older than the victim, that constitutes a sexual offense in the fourth degree. If the offender is at least 21 years old, and they engage in vaginal intercourse or other sexual acts (including oral and anal sex), that constitutes a sexual offense in the third degree.
- If a victim is under 14 and the offender at least 4 years older, and they engage in a sex act (oral, anal and other sex acts, but not vaginal intercourse), that constitutes a sexual offense in the second degree. If they engage in vaginal intercourse, that constitutes rape in the second degree. (Note: In Maryland, sexual offense (1st & 2nd degree) and rape (1st & 2nd degree) carry the same penalty. The distinction is that a rape involves vaginal intercourse.) If they have sexual contact (kissing, touching for sexual gratification), that constitutes a sexual offense in the third degree.
- An additional violation is the crime of "sexual solicitation of minor". § 3-324. Under this statute, it is illegal to solicit any minor under 18 (or a law enforcement officer posing as a minor) by any means (in person, by agent, online, telephone, mail, writing etc.) to commit a rape or sexual offense in the second degree, sexual offense in the third degree, or prostitution.

=== Massachusetts ===
The age of consent in Massachusetts is 16.

Section 23 of Chapter 265 of the General Laws of Massachusetts states:

"Whoever unlawfully has sexual intercourse or unnatural sexual intercourse, and abuses a child under sixteen years of age shall ... be punished ..." MGL 265-23

Section 35A of Chapter 272 states:

"Whoever commits any unnatural and lascivious act with a child under the age of sixteen shall be punished ... "

However, Chapter 272, Section 4 sets another age of consent at 18 when the victim is "of chaste life" and the perpetrator induces them to have "unlawful" sexual intercourse.

"Whoever induces any person under 18 years of age of chaste life to have unlawful sexual intercourse shall be punished." MGL 272-4

=== Michigan ===
The age of consent in Michigan is 16, unless one is an authority figure in which case the age of consent is 18. There is no close-in-age exemption.

750.520d Criminal sexual conduct in the third degree; felony. Sec. 520d. (1) A person is guilty of criminal sexual conduct in the third degree if the person engages in sexual penetration with another person and if any of the following circumstances exist: (a) That other person is at least 13 years of age and under 16 years of age ...

In March 2012 the Michigan Senate passed a bill which was to prohibit sexual relations between students of any age and teachers. It passed 36–2.

=== Minnesota ===
The age of consent in Minnesota is 16.

If the actor is in a position of authority, the age of consent is 18. Children under age 16 are considered incapable of consent (but it is a lesser offense if the older party is less than 36 months older). If the younger party is 13, 14 or 15, the other person must be no more than 24 months older for acts of penetration, and 48 months older for sexual activity not amounting to penetration. The specifics of these laws are covered under Sections 609.34x of the Minnesota Criminal Code. Specifically sections 609.341 Definitions, 609.342 Criminal Sexual Conduct in the First Degree, 609.343 Criminal Sexual Conduct in the Second Degree, 609.344 Criminal Sexual Conduct in the Third Degree, 609.345 Criminal Sexual Conduct in the Fourth Degree, and 609.3451 Criminal Sexual Conduct in the Fifth Degree.

=== Mississippi ===
The age of consent in Mississippi is 16.

§ 97-3-65. Statutory rape; enhanced penalty for forcible sexual intercourse or statutory rape by administering certain substances.

(1)The crime of statutory rape is committed when:

(a) Any person seventeen (17) years of age or older has sexual intercourse with a child who:

(i) Is at least fourteen (14) but under sixteen (16) years of age;

(ii) Is thirty-six (36) or more months younger than the person; and

(iii) Is not the person's spouse

§ 97-3-95. Sexual battery.

(1) A person is guilty of sexual battery if he or she engages in sexual penetration with: ... (c) A child at least fourteen (14) but under sixteen (16) years of age, if the person is thirty-six (36) or more months older than the child ...

=== Missouri ===
The age of consent in Missouri is 17. There is a 4-year "close in age" exception for minors aged 14–16, but no exception for those aged 13 or below.

Mistake as to the age of the victim may be a defense in some circumstances.

Statutory rape and sodomy involve a victim less than 14 years of age. Statutory rape and sodomy in the second degree involve a victim less than 17 years of age and an accused who is 21 years of age or older. The crime of child molestation in the fourth degree occurs when a person, "being more than 4 years older than the child less than 17 years of age, subjects the child to sexual contact".

While the statutory titles are cast in terms of Rape and Sodomy, the statutes prohibit conduct that is described as "sexual intercourse" and "deviant sexual intercourse".

Statutory rape, second degree, penalty. − 566.034. 1. A person commits the crime of statutory rape in the second degree if being twenty-one years of age or older, he has sexual intercourse with another person who is less than seventeen years of age.

Statutory sodomy, second degree, penalty. 566.064. 1. A person commits the crime of statutory sodomy in the second degree if being twenty-one years of age or older, he has deviate sexual intercourse with another person who is less than seventeen years of age.

Child molestation, fourth degree, penalty. 566.071. 1. A person commits the offense of child molestation in the fourth degree if, being more than four years older than a child who is less than seventeen years of age, subjects the child to sexual contact. 2. The offense of child molestation in the fourth degree is a class E felony.

Child molestation, third degree, penalty 566.069. 1. A person commits the offense of child molestation in the third degree if he or she subjects a child who is less than fourteen years of age to sexual contact. 2. The offense of child molestation in the third degree is a class C felony, unless committed by the use of forcible compulsion, in which case it is a class B felony.

=== Montana ===
The age of consent in Montana is 16 per Montana Code Annotated (2019) section 45-5-625(c).

=== Nebraska ===
The age of consent in Nebraska is 16.

In addition Nebraska has a law prohibiting "lewdly inducing" a person under 17 to "carnally know" any other person.

28-319. Sexual assault; first degree; penalty.

(1) Any person who subjects another person to sexual penetration

(a) without the consent of the victim,
(b) who knew or should have known that the victim was mentally or physically incapable of resisting or appraising the nature of his or her conduct, or
(c) when the actor is nineteen years of age or older and the victim is at least twelve but less than sixteen years of age is guilty of sexual assault in the first degree.

(2) Sexual assault in the first degree is a Class II felony. The sentencing judge shall consider whether the actor caused serious personal injury to the victim in reaching a decision on the sentence.

(3) Any person who is found guilty of sexual assault in the first degree for a second time when the first conviction was pursuant to this section or any other state or federal law with essentially the same elements as this section shall be sentenced to a mandatory minimum term of twenty-five years in prison.

28-319.01. Sexual assault of a child; first degree; penalty.

(1) A person commits sexual assault of a child in the first degree:

(a) When he or she subjects another person under twelve years of age to sexual penetration and the actor is at least nineteen years of age or older; or
(b) When he or she subjects another person who is at least twelve years of age but less than sixteen years of age to sexual penetration and the actor is twenty-five years of age or older.

(2) Sexual assault of a child in the first degree is a Class IB felony with a mandatory minimum sentence of fifteen years in prison for the first offense.

(3) Any person who is found guilty of sexual assault of a child in the first degree under this section and who has previously been convicted

(a) under this section,
(b) under section 28-319 of first degree or attempted first degree sexual assault,
(c) under section 28-320.01 before July 14, 2006, of sexual assault of a child or attempted sexual assault of a child,
(d) under section 28-320.01 on or after July 14, 2006, of sexual assault of a child in the second or third degree or attempted sexual assault of a child in the second or third degree, or
(e) in any other state or federal court under laws with essentially the same elements as this section, section 28-319, or section 28-320.01 as it existed before, on, or after July 14, 2006, shall be guilty of a Class IB felony with a mandatory minimum sentence of twenty-five years in prison.

(4) In any prosecution under this section, the age of the actor shall be an essential element of the offense that must be proved beyond a reasonable doubt.

=== Nevada ===
The age of consent in Nevada is 16.

NRS 200.364 Definitions. As used in NRS 200.364 to 200.3774, inclusive, unless the context otherwise requires:

... 3."Statutory sexual seduction" means: (a) Ordinary sexual intercourse, anal intercourse, cunnilingus or fellatio committed by a person 18 years of age or older with a person under the age of 16 years; or (b) Any other sexual penetration committed by a person 18 years of age or older with a person under the age of 16 years with the intent of arousing, appealing to, or gratifying the lust or passions or sexual desires of either of the persons.

=== New Hampshire ===
The age of consent in New Hampshire is 16. Sexual penetration with a person at least 13 but younger than 16 years old is always illegal, but is only a misdemeanor if the age difference is under 4 years, and in that case the "offender" is not required to register as a sex offender. Sexual contact (without penetration) is legal between those 13–15 years of age and partners less than 5 years older. However, if the partner is acting "in loco parentis", e.g. as a teacher or a guardian, the minimum age is 18. NH Criminal code Section 632-A:3 and Section 632-A:2 Section 632-A:4

=== New Jersey ===
The age of consent in New Jersey is 16.

There is an exception. If the victim is less than 18 and the partner is a parent, guardian, sibling or any other person closer than a fourth cousin or has any type of authority over the victim (for example, a teacher) then the assailant may be charged with a crime. For instance, it's criminal for a manager of any age to have sex with a 16 or 17-year-old subordinate, even if the sex is consensual.

State law implies (by not saying anything) that minors between 13 and 15 years old may, in general, engage in a consensual sexual relationship with someone up to four years older. Therefore, for example, it is legal for a 14-year-old male or female to engage in consensual sex with a person up to 18 years of age.

Specifically, NJ state law details three circumstances of sexual assault under which the age of consent is pertinent.

For aggravated sexual assault (a crime of the first degree), a person must have committed sexual penetration (that is, intercourse, oral or anal sex or something inserted) while either (1) the victim was under 13 or (2) the assailant exercised some legal or occupational authority over the victim who was between 13 and 15. (All other conditions for aggravated sexual assault do not impact the NJ age of consent.)

Simple sexual assault (a crime of the second degree) is defined in two ways, according to N.J.S.A 2C:14-2(b).

First, a person must have committed sexual contact (that is, intentional touching of intimate parts for sexual gratification) while the victim was under 13 and the assailant was over four years older. Or, second, a person must have committed sexual penetration (defined above under aggravated sexual assault) while not using force and either (1) the victim was 16 or 17 and one of the following conditions was true:

(a) the assailant was a third cousin or closer OR
(b) the assailant exercised some authority over the victim OR
(c) the assailant was a legal guardian in the household of the victim

or (2) the victim was between 13 and 15 and the assailant was over four years older. (All other conditions for simple sexual assault do not impact the NJ age of consent.)

In a period before 1979 the age of consent was raised to 16. In May 1979 the New Jersey Legislature passed a bill sponsored by Christopher Jackman, the assembly speaker, changed the age of consent to 13. This bill was scheduled to go into effect on September 1, 1979. By June 1979 there were reports Governor of New Jersey Brendan T. Byrne had refused to sign the bill into law. The coordinator for New Jersey Majority Women, Elizabeth Sadowski, asked for a postponement of this bill.

=== New Mexico ===
The age of consent for penetrative sexual activity in New Mexico is 16 with age gap, marital, and school employee provisions.

New Mexico Code > Chapter 30 > Article 9 > Section 30-9-11: Criminal sexual penetration.

F. Criminal sexual penetration in the fourth degree consists of all criminal sexual penetration:

(1) not defined in Subsections C through E of this section perpetrated on a child thirteen to sixteen years of age when the perpetrator is at least eighteen years of age and is at least four years older than the child and not the spouse of that child; or:

(2) perpetrated on a child thirteen to eighteen years of age when the perpetrator, who is a licensed school employee, an unlicensed school employee, a school contract employee, a school health service provider or a school volunteer, and who is at least eighteen years of age and is at least four years older than the child and not the spouse of that child, learns while performing services in or for a school that the child is a student in a school.

Whoever commits criminal sexual penetration in the fourth degree is guilty of a fourth degree felony.

This was also confirmed by the Supreme Court of New Mexico in Perez v State (1990), in which it was determined that mistake of age may be a potential defense to charges of criminal sexual penetration where the victim is over 13 years of age. The court stated; "The fact that knowledge of a child's age is not an essential element of the crime does not dispose of defendant's argument that mistake of fact may be raised as a defense. It simply means that the state does not have to prove defendant knew the victim was under the age of sixteen. Whether or not mistake of fact may be raised as a defense depends on whether the legislature intended the crime to be a strict liability offense or whether criminal intent is required."

In State v Samora (2016), the Supreme Court of New Mexico hold that "Unlike in Moore, where the victim was fourteen years old, whether J.Z. consented to sex with Defendant was legally relevant to the CSP-felony charge because sixteen-year-old J.Z. could have legally consented to sex with Defendant.".

The statutes of enticement of a child and criminal sexual communication with a child also apply in cases where the victim is younger than 16.

30-9-1. Enticement of child.

Enticement of child consists of: A. enticing, persuading or attempting to persuade a child under the age of sixteen years to enter any vehicle, building, room or secluded place with intent to commit an act which would constitute a crime under Article 9 of the Criminal Code; or B. having possession of a child under the age of sixteen years in any vehicle, building, room or secluded place with intent to commit an act which would constitute a crime under Article 9 of the Criminal Code.

Whoever commits enticement of child is guilty of a misdemeanor

30-37-3.3. Criminal sexual communication with a child; penalty.

A. Criminal sexual communication with a child consists of a person knowingly and intentionally communicating directly with a specific child under sixteen years of age by sending the child obscene images of the person's intimate parts by means of an electronic communication device when the perpetrator is at least four years older than the child.

B. Whoever commits sexual communication with a child is guilty of a fourth degree felony.

For non-penetrative contact, the minimum age specified is 13. This increases to 18 if the defendant is in a position of authority, and uses this authority to coerce the minor to submit.

30-6-3 stipulates the crime of "contributing to the delinquency of minor" for any act or omission of duty that causes or tends to cause the delinquency of any person under 18 years. It is a 4th degree felony, but not a sexual offense.

=== New York ===
The age of consent in New York is 17.

The offense will be more serious depending on relative ages, thus:

- Sex with a person under 17 is a misdemeanor if the perpetrator is at least 16 (see infra). ("Sexual misconduct", NY Penal Law § 130.20.)
- Sex with a person under 17 is a Class "E" felony if the perpetrator is at least 21. ("Rape in the third degree", NY Penal Law § 130.25; "Criminal sexual act in the third degree", NY Penal Law § 130.40.)
- Sex with a person under 15 is a Class "D" violent felony if the perpetrator is at least 18. However, it is a defense to this charge if an 18-year-old perpetrator proves by a preponderance that he or she was less than four years older than the victim. This is not a defense to any other charge that might apply, i.e., Sexual misconduct, supra. ("Rape in the second degree", NY Penal Law § 130.30; "Criminal sexual act in the second degree", NY Penal Law § 130.45.)
- Sex with a person under 13 is a Class "B" violent felony if the perpetrator is at least 18. ("Rape in the first degree", NY Penal Law § 130.35[4]; "Criminal sexual act in the first degree", NY Penal Law § 130.50[4].)
- Sex with a person under 11 is a Class "B" violent felony if the perpetrator is at least 16. ("Rape in the first degree", NY Penal Law § 130.35[3]; "Criminal sexual act in the first degree", NY Penal Law § 130.50[3].)

"Sex", as used above, refers to the four conspicuous types of sexual acts, including "sexual intercourse", "oral sexual conduct" (both types), and "anal sexual conduct". The latter three acts were known by statute as "deviant sexual intercourse" prior to 2003.

Non-intercourse sexual activity is also regulated based on age. Non-intercourse sexual activity, called "sexual contact" is defined as "any touching of the sexual or other intimate parts of a person not married to the actor for the purpose of gratifying sexual desire of either party. It includes the touching of the actor by the victim, as well as the touching of the victim by the actor, whether directly or through clothing." (NY Penal Law § 130.00[3].) If the person is underage such "sexual contact" can constitute the crime of "sexual abuse".

- "Sexual contact" with a person less than 17 but at least 14, by a perpetrator who is at least five years older than the victim is "Sexual abuse in the third degree", a class B misdemeanor. (NY Penal Law § 130.55.)
- "Sexual contact" with a person less than 14 is "Sexual abuse in the second degree", a Class A misdemeanor, if the perpetrator is at least 16. (NY Penal Law § 130.60[2].)
- "Sexual contact" with a person less than 11 is "Sexual abuse in the first degree", a class "D" violent felony, if the perpetrator is at least 16. (NY Penal Law § 130.65[3].)

==== Certain defenses ====
It is not a defense that the perpetrator believed the victim was older than is later proven. (NY Penal Law § 15.20[3].)

Legally recognized marriage is a defense. (NY Penal Law § 130.10[4].)

The only minimum age for a perpetrator of first degree rape/criminal sexual act with a victim under 11 (NY Penal Law §§ 130.35[3] & 130.50[3]), sexual abuse in the first and second degrees (NY Penal Law §§ 130.65[3] & 130.60[2]), and misdemeanor sexual misconduct (NY Penal Law § 130.20) is provided by the defense of infancy found at NY Penal Law § 30.00(1); that age is 16 years old. Someone under that age may be adjudicated a juvenile delinquent, but may not commit these crimes. On the other hand, someone who is 16 years old commits a crime by voluntarily having sex with anyone who cannot themselves legally consent to sex, including another 16-year-old, even if this "victim" is actually older. (People v. Bowman, 88 Misc. 2d 50; 387 N.Y.S.2d 982 [City Crim. Ct. 1976]; Matter of Jessie C., 164 A.D.2d 731; 565 N.Y.S.2d 941 [4 Dept., 1991].) In effect, mutual crimes are committed when two unmarried 16-year-old individuals voluntarily have sex with each other in New York State, each being the "victim" of the other.

==== Other crimes ====
It appears that the crime of "Predatory sexual assault against a child", a class A-II felony, effectively subsumes all instances of "statutory" first degree rape/criminal sexual act where the victim is under 13 (NY Penal Law §§ 130.35[4], 130.50[4]) and the perpetrator over 18. (NY Penal Law § 130.96.) Thus, any person who commits one of these lesser offenses would necessarily commit the greater offense of "Predatory sexual assault against a child." (See, People v. Lawrence, 81 A.D.3d 1326; 916 N.Y.S.2d 393 [4 Dept. 2011].)

There are other special offenses, namely "Course of sexual conduct against a child in the first degree" and "Course of sexual conduct against a child in the second degree" that punish sex with an underage person combined with an additional illegal sexual act during wide time periods. These do not subject a person to more punishment than the crimes listed above but provide only a gimmick for prosecutors to avoid the requirement that an individual sex act be specified in a rape indictment. (See, People v. Beauchamp, 74 N.Y.2d 639; 539 N.E.2d 1105 [1989].)

(Note that "violent felonies" are specified by NY Penal Law § 70.02. Actual "violence" is irrelevant.)

New York Penal Law Article 130

=== North Carolina ===
The age of consent in North Carolina is 16. However, certain exceptions to this general rule exist.

No employee of a K-12 school can have any sexual activity with any student at that school except when married to the person {§ 14‑27.7}; this is a felony unless the actor is less than 4 years older than the student and is not a teacher, administrator, student teacher, safety officer, or coach. This prohibition covers adults and students who were at the school at the same time, and continues in force as long as the younger person is a student at any K-12 school, regardless of age.

Any sexual intercourse with a person under 16 years of age is prohibited unless the defendant is less than 4 years older than the victim except when married to the person {§ 14‑27.2, 14‑27.4 & 14‑27.7A}.

§ 14‑27.7A. Statutory rape or sexual offense of person who is 13, 14, or 15 years old.

(a) A defendant is guilty of a Class B1 felony if the defendant engages in vaginal intercourse or a sexual act with another person who is 13, 14, or 15 years old and the defendant is at least six years older than the person, except when the defendant is lawfully married to the person.

(b) A defendant is guilty of a Class C felony if the defendant engages in vaginal intercourse or a sexual act with another person who is 13, 14, or 15 years old and the defendant is more than four but less than six years older than the person, except when the defendant is lawfully married to the person.

North Carolina General Statutes Chapter 14

=== North Dakota ===
The age of consent in North Dakota is 18, with a close-in-age exemption for minors aged 15–17 as long as the older partner is less than three years older.

12.1-20-03. Gross sexual imposition – Penalty.

1.A person who engages in a sexual act with another, or who causes another to engage in a sexual act, is guilty of an offense if ... the victim is less than fifteen years old

Section 12.1-20-05 of the code refers to sexual acts between adults and teenagers aged 15, 16 and 17:

12.1-20-05. Corruption or solicitation of minors.

1. An adult who engages in, solicits with the intent to engage in, or causes another to engage in a sexual act with a minor, is guilty of a class A misdemeanor if the victim is a minor fifteen years of age or older.
2. An adult who solicits with the intent to engage in a sexual act with a minor under age fifteen or engages in or causes another to engage in a sexual act when the adult is at least twenty-two years of age and the victim is a minor fifteen years of age or older, is guilty of a class C felony.

Under section 12.1-20-07. Sexual assault., an adult who has sexual contact with or causes someone else to have sexual contact with a person under the age of 18 is guilty of a class C felony if the adult is at least 22 years of age, or class A misdemeanor if the adult is aged 18–21.

In North Dakota law, "minor" refers to individuals under the age of 18 and "adult" refers to individuals aged 18 or older.

=== Ohio ===
The age of consent in Ohio is 16 as specified by Section 2907.04 of the Ohio Revised Code. However, there exists a close-in-age exception where a minor 13 or older can consent to sex as long as their partner is also at least 13 but less than 18 years old.

2907.04 Unlawful sexual conduct with minor.

(A) No person who is eighteen years of age or older shall engage in sexual conduct with another, who is not the spouse of the offender, when the offender knows the other person is thirteen years of age or older but less than sixteen years of age, or the offender is reckless in that regard.

(B) Whoever violates this section is guilty of unlawful sexual conduct with a minor.

(1) Except as otherwise provided in divisions (B)(2), (3), and (4) of this section, unlawful sexual conduct with a minor is a felony of the fourth degree.

(2) Except as otherwise provided in division (B)(4) of this section, if the offender is less than four years older than the other person, unlawful sexual conduct with a minor is a misdemeanor of the first degree.

(3) Except as otherwise provided in division (B)(4) of this section, if the offender is ten or more years older than the other person, unlawful sexual conduct with a minor is a felony of the third degree.

(4) If the offender previously has been convicted of or pleaded guilty to a violation of section 2907.02, 2907.03, or 2907.04 of the Revised Code or a violation of former section 2907.12 of the Revised Code, unlawful sexual conduct with a minor is a felony of the second degree.

Non-penetrative sexual contact is permitted between 13- to 15-year-olds and anyone less than 4 years older, even if the older person is 18 or older.

2907.06 Sexual imposition
(A) No person shall have sexual contact with another, not the spouse of the offender; cause another, not the spouse of the offender, to have sexual contact with the offender; or cause two or more other persons to have sexual contact when any of the following applies...
(4) "The other person, or one of the other persons, is thirteen years of age or older but less than sixteen years of age, whether or not the offender knows the age of such person, and the offender is at least eighteen years of age and four or more years older than such other person.

It is illegal for a person of any age to have sex with a child beneath 13 years of age who they are not married to.

2907.02 (A) 1. No person shall engage in sexual conduct with another who is not the spouse of the offender or who is the spouse of the offender but is living separate and apart from the offender when any of the following applies ...
(b) the other person is less than thirteen years of age, whether or not the offender knows the age of the other person

{§ 2907.02}.

However, the preceding statute, Section 2907.03, specifies that sexual conduct between anyone under 18 and a teacher, administrator, or coach of the school they attend, a cleric, or other person in authority, is punishable as a felony of the third degree.

2907.03 Sexual battery.

(A) No person shall engage in sexual conduct with another, not the spouse of the offender, when any of the following apply:

(5) The offender is the other person's natural or adoptive parent, or a stepparent, or guardian, custodian, or person in loco parentis of the other person.
(7) The offender is a teacher, administrator, coach, or other person in authority employed by or serving in a school for which the state board of education prescribes minimum standards pursuant to division (D) of section 3301.07 of the Revised Code, the other person is enrolled in or attends that school, and the offender is not enrolled in and does not attend that school.
(8) The other person is a minor, the offender is a teacher, administrator, coach, or other person in authority employed by or serving in an institution of higher education, and the other person is enrolled in or attends that institution.
(9) The other person is a minor, and the offender is the other person's athletic or other type of coach, is the other person's instructor, is the leader of a scouting troop of which the other person is a member, or is a person with temporary or occasional disciplinary control over the other person.
(12) The other person is a minor, the offender is a cleric, and the other person is a member of, or attends, the church or congregation served by the cleric. {§ 2907.03}

Ohio law also contains a rule against importuning, which means a perpetrator of any age sexually soliciting a minor over the internet if the minor is under the age of 13, or in the case of a perpetrator 18 years of age or older, sexually soliciting any minor who is 13–15 years of age AND at least 4 years younger than the 18+ aged person.{§ 2907.07}

Laws against "contributing to the unruliness or delinquency of a child" (§ 2919.24) and "interference with custody" (§ 2919.23) may be used against those who have sex with those who are 16 and 17 if a parent or guardian complains. These two crimes are not considered to be sexual offenses. In 1989 Donald Edgar Lukens was prosecuted under the misdemeanor charge "contributing to the delinquency and unruliness of a child" for having sex with a 16-year-old girl. At the time he was 58 years old, and he received a 30-day jail sentence.

=== Oklahoma ===
The age of consent in Oklahoma is 18. Romeo and Juliet laws apply to minors aged 16 or older if the older person is not more than 4 years older.

An employee of a school system who has sexual conduct with a student of that school system aged between 16 and 19 may face criminal charges in Oklahoma: "Rape is an act of sexual intercourse involving vaginal or anal penetration accomplished with a male or female who is not the spouse of the perpetrator and who may be of the same or the opposite sex as the perpetrator under any of the following circumstances ... Where the victim is less than twenty (20) years of age and is a student, or under the legal custody or supervision of any public or private elementary or secondary school, junior high or high school, or public vocational school, and engages in sexual intercourse with a person who is eighteen (18) years of age or older and is an employee of the same school system" 21 O.S. § 1111 (OSCN 2025)

=== Oregon ===
The age of consent in Oregon is 18. Sexual offenses are defined under the Oregon Revised Statutes Chapter 163. With regards to age only, the following offenses are defined.

18: Consent for all laws. (ORS 163.345 – ORS 163–425)
Under 18: Defined as Sexual Abuse 3 (Class A Misdemeanor)
Under 16: Defined as Rape 3 / Sodomy 3 (Class C Felony)
Under 14: Defined as Rape 2 / Sodomy 2 (Class B Felony)
Under 12: Defined as Rape 1 / Sodomy 1 (Class A Felony)

Additionally, Oregon has a three-year rule defined under ORS 163.345. However, this does not apply to Rape 1, or Sodomy 1, effectively limiting the age to 12. However, a person within the three-year limit can still be charged with Sexual Misconduct (Class C Misdemeanor) under ORS 163.445, if the victim was under 15 years of age (163.345(3)).

=== Pennsylvania ===
The age of consent in Pennsylvania is 16 years of age for sexual consent. The age of consent was lowered from 16 to 14 in 1976 and was increased back to 16 in 1995. The statute in place between 1976 and 1995 defined statutory rape as a person 18 years or older having sex with a person not their spouse under 14 years old, bizarrely seeming to have set no age of consent as long as both parties were under 18, and have made it legal for 17-year-olds to have sex with much younger children.

Under current Pennsylvania law, teenagers aged 13, 14 and 15 may or may not be able to legally engage in sexual activity with partners who are less than 4 years older. Such partners could not be prosecuted under statutory rape laws, but may be liable for other offenses, even when the sexual activity is consensual.

In December 2011 the Pennsylvania Legislature passed an amendment stating that an employee of a school who engages in sexual relations with any student or athletic player under the age of 18 may receive a third-degree felony charge. In 2014 Governor of Pennsylvania Tom Corbett signed into law an amendment making this law apply to athletic coaches who work outside of an educational setting. Historically Pennsylvania prosecutors were only allowed to issue misdemeanor charges such as corruption of minors against teachers and coaches who had sex with 16 and 17-year-old students. In addition to the corruption of minors charge, Pennsylvania prosecutors have also brought child endangerment charges against schoolteachers who had sex with 16 and 17-year-old students.

==== Pennsylvania legal codes ====
Under Pennsylvania law, a defendant is strictly liable for the offense of rape, a felony of the first degree, when the complainant is 12 or younger. Pennsylvania has enacted several other strict liability sexual offenses when the complainant is under 16, but 13 years old or older.

§ 3122.1. Statutory sexual assault.

Except as provided in section 3121 (relating to rape), a person commits a felony of the second degree when that person engages in sexual intercourse with a complainant under the age of 16 years and that person is four or more years older than the complainant and the complainant and the person are not married to each other.

§ 3125 Aggravated indecent assault

(7) the complainant is less than 13 years of age; or (8) the complainant is less than 16 years of age and the person is four or more years older than the complainant and the complainant and the person are not married to each other. (b) Aggravated indecent assault of a child.--A person commits aggravated indecent assault of a child when the person violates subsection (a)(1), (2), (3), (4), (5) or (6) and the complainant is less than 13 years of age.

§ 3123 Involuntary deviate sexual intercourse

(7) who is less than 16 years of age and the person is four or more years older than the complainant and the complainant and person are not married to each other.

When the alleged victim is 16 or older and less than 18 years of age, and the alleged offender is over the age of 18, the Commonwealth may charge the offense of corruption of minors or unlawful contact with a minor, even if the activity was consensual:

§ 6301 Corruption of minors.

(a) Offense defined.-- (1) Whoever, being of the age of 18 years and upwards, by any act corrupts or tends to corrupt the morals of any minor less than 18 years of age, or who aids, abets, entices or encourages any such minor in the commission of any crime, or who knowingly assists or encourages such minor in violating his or her parole or any order of court, commits a misdemeanor of the first degree.

The crime of corruption of minors is usually a crime that accompanies another "more serious" crime such as statutory rape or involuntary deviate sexual intercourse or accompanies some drug or alcohol use, possession or sale. Tending to corrupt like contributing to delinquency is a broad term involving conduct toward a child in an unlimited variety of ways which tends to produce or to encourage or to continue conduct of the child which would amount to delinquent conduct.

The question of whether consensual intercourse with a minor 16 years or older tends to corrupt the morals of that minor is a jury question to be decided by the "common sense of the community".

§ 6318. Unlawful contact with minor.

(a) Offense defined.--A person commits an offense if he is intentionally in contact with a minor, or a law enforcement officer acting in the performance of his duties who has assumed the identity of a minor, for the purpose of engaging in an activity prohibited under any of the following, and either the person initiating the contact or the person being contacted is within this Commonwealth: (1) Any of the offenses enumerated in Chapter 31 (relating to sexual offenses). (2) Open lewdness as defined in section 5901 (relating to open lewdness). (3) Prostitution as defined in section 5902 (relating to prostitution and related offenses). (4) Obscene and other sexual materials and performances as defined in section 5903 (relating to obscene and other sexual materials and performances). (5) Sexual abuse of children as defined in section 6312 (relating to sexual abuse of children). (6) Sexual exploitation of children as defined in section 6320 (relating to sexual exploitation of children).

There is also a corruption of minors statute against adults corrupting the morals of minors under 18 years of age. However, the corruption of minors statute only applies to perpetrators 18 years of age and older. In 2005 JoAnne Epps, a former prosecutor and Temple University Beasley School of Law dean of academic affairs, stated that the corruption of minors charge is considered to be a separate crime from that of statutory rape; she stated that the consideration of whether a minor is consenting to sexual activity is a separate issue from whether someone is corrupting the minor's morals.

=== Rhode Island ===
The age of consent in Rhode Island is 16. Sexual intercourse with a minor aged 14–15 by an actor 18 or older is third degree sexual assault, sexual intercourse with a minor under the age of 14 by an actor of any age is child molestation. However, there is a close-in-age exception that allows people aged 16–17 to have sex with a minor aged 14 or 15, but not younger.

§ 11-37-6 Third degree sexual assault. – A person is guilty of third degree sexual assault if he or she is over the age of eighteen (18) years and engaged in sexual penetration with another person over the age of fourteen (14) years and under the age of consent, sixteen (16) years of age. § 11-37-8.1 First degree child molestation sexual assault. – A person is guilty of first degree child molestation sexual assault if he or she engages in sexual penetration with a person fourteen (14) years of age or under.

Non-penetrative activity with minors 14 and younger constitutes second degree child molestation.

=== South Carolina ===
The age of consent in South Carolina is 16.

§ 16-3-651. Criminal sexual conduct: definitions ... (h) "Sexual battery" means sexual intercourse, cunnilingus, fellatio, anal intercourse, or any intrusion, however slight, of any part of a person's body or of any object into the genital or anal openings of another person's body, except when such intrusion is accomplished for medically recognized treatment or diagnostic purposes.

§ 16-3-655. Criminal sexual conduct with a minor

(A) A person is guilty of criminal sexual conduct with a minor in the first degree if:

(1) the actor engages in sexual battery with a victim who is less than eleven years of age; or

(2) the actor engages in sexual battery with a victim who is less than sixteen years of age and the actor has previously been convicted of, pled guilty or nolo contendere to, or adjudicated delinquent for an offense listed in Section 23-3-430(C) or has been ordered to be included in the sex offender registry pursuant to § 23-3-430(D).

(B) A person is guilty of criminal sexual conduct with a minor in the second degree if:

(1) the actor engages in sexual battery with a victim who is fourteen years of age or less but who is at least eleven years of age; or

(2) the actor engages in sexual battery with a victim who is at least fourteen years of age but who is less than sixteen years of age and the actor is in a position of familial, custodial, or official authority to coerce the victim to submit or is older than the victim. However, a person may not be convicted of a violation of the provisions of this item if he is eighteen years of age or less when he engages in consensual sexual conduct with another person who is at least fourteen years of age.

(C) A person is guilty of criminal sexual conduct with a minor in the third degree if the actor is over fourteen years of age and the actor wilfully and lewdly commits or attempts to commit a lewd or lascivious act upon or with the body, or its parts, of a child under sixteen years of age, with the intent of arousing, appealing to, or gratifying the lust, passions, or sexual desires of the actor or the child. However, a person may not be convicted of a violation of the provisions of this subsection if the person is eighteen years of age or less when the person engages in consensual lewd or lascivious conduct with another person who is at least fourteen years of age.

=== South Dakota ===
The age of consent in South Dakota is 16 and there is no close-in-age exemption, although if the perpetrator is within three years of age of the victim or is under 18 the penalties are reduced.

§ 22-22-1. Rape defined—Degrees—Felony. Rape is an act of sexual penetration accomplished with any person under any of the following circumstances: ... (5)If the victim is thirteen years of age, but less than sixteen years of age, and the perpetrator is at least three years older than the victim.

§ 22-22-7. Sexual contact with child under sixteen—Felony or misdemeanor. Any person, sixteen years of age or older, who knowingly engages in sexual contact with another person, other than that person's spouse if the other person is under the age of sixteen years is guilty of a Class 3 felony. If the actor is less than three years older than the other person, the actor is guilty of a Class 1 misdemeanor. If an adult has a previous conviction for a felony violation of this section, any subsequent felony conviction for a violation under this section, is a Class 2 felony. Notwithstanding § 23A-42-2, a charge brought pursuant to this section may be commenced at any time before the victim becomes age twenty-five or within seven years of the commission of the crime, whichever is longer.

§ 22-22-7.3. Sexual contact with child under sixteen years of age—Violation as misdemeanor. Any person, younger than sixteen years of age, who knowingly engages in sexual contact with another person, other than his or her spouse, if such other person is younger than sixteen years of age, is guilty of a Class 1 misdemeanor.

=== Tennessee ===
The age of consent in Tennessee is 18. A close-in-age exemption allows minors aged 13–17 to engage in sexual penetration with partners less than 4 years older. Penalties differ depending on the age of the minor, as well as the age difference between the minor and the offender. (see Article 39-13-506. Statutory rape).

Aside from situations involving a position of authority, the only age limit for non-penetrative sexual contact appears to be 13.

=== Texas ===
The age of consent in Texas is 17, though there is a specific law targeting "sexual performance", which requires a visual representation (like a video or a part in a play). A Texas court case decision, Ex parte Fujisaka, argued that these two laws, specifying different ages below which a sexual act may be considered a criminal act, are to be treated independently of each other.

Section 43.25(b) Sexual Performance by a Minor makes it a crime to employ, authorize, or induce a child younger than 18 years of age to engage in a sexual performance or to engage in sexual conduct without any requirement of performance. A parent or legal guardian or custodian of a child younger than 18 years of age commits an offense if he/she consents to the participation by the child in a sexual performance. When inducement is an element of 43.25(b), it is not required that there be a threat, promise of payment or other specific incentive or even verbal persuasion for the inducement to be proven.

Some confusion arises regarding the applicability of section 43.25 to mere "sexual conduct", due to the section title "sexual performance by a child" and other provisions that seem to suggest that the intention of this section is to criminalize commercial sexual performances by a minor. However, in John Perry Dornbusch, Appellant, v. The State of Texas as well as in Summers v. State, 11-92-057-CR, 845 S.W.2d 440 (1992), the decisions support the interpretation that section 43.25(b) is not limited to cases involving "sexual performance" as defined by section 43.25(a)(1).

Section 33.021 Online Solicitation of a Minor is a criminal offense that makes it illegal for someone 17 years and older to intentionally or knowingly communicate certain sexual content or try to induce or solicit a minor under 17 years of age, or any communication, language, or material, including a photographic or video image, that relates to or describes sexual conduct.

Section 21.12 Improper Relationship Between Educator and Student prohibits all sexual contact between an employee of a school (including educators), and a student enrolled at the primary or secondary school or school district where said employee works (unless the student is the employee's spouse). No age is specified by the statute (thus, even if the student has reached the age of consent, it is still a violation), and violations are a second degree felony. People convicted under 21.12 do not have to register as sex offenders. The law exists to prevent scenarios where a teacher or employee coerces a student into a sexual relationship in exchange for higher grades or other favors.

In 2003, Helen Giddings, a Democratic member of the Texas House of Representatives, first authored the anti student-teacher sex bill but only intended for it to take effect if the student is 17 or younger. Warren Chisum of Pampa removed the maximum age from the bill. The bill was passed in 2003. Shortly after the law passed, a teacher engaged in sexual intercourse with her 18-year-old student, and a Texas court refused to indict her. In 2011, an amendment made it illegal for a teacher to having sexual relations with any student in the teacher's school district, not just the teacher's school. Afterwards, criminal prosecutions of teachers in relationships with students going to other schools in the same school district, including teachers of other educational levels, began occurring. In response to this law, Houston lawyer Dick DeGuerin stated "Unless there's real strong evidence of a teacher trading sex for grades or using improper influence, then it's a statute that is really open to abuse."

=== Utah ===
In Utah, the minimum age to consent to sexual conduct is 18. (All ages mentioned are "at the time of the act".) Under the Romeo & Juliet exception, it is legal for minors aged 16 and 17 to engage in consensual sexual conduct with partners who are less than 7 years older, and up to 10 years older if the older reasonably did not know the minor's age.

§ 76-5-401.2. Unlawful sexual conduct with a 16- or 17-year-old. Effective August 5, 2018: Here "minor" means an individual who is 16 years of age or older, but younger than 18 years of age. An individual commits unlawful sexual conduct with a minor if they are 10 or more years older, or seven or more years older but less than 10 years older and knew or reasonably should have known the age of the minor and (under circumstances not amounting to rape, object rape, forcible sodomy, forcible sexual abuse, aggravated sexual assault, unlawful sexual activity with a minor, or an attempt to commit any of those offenses):

(i) has sexual intercourse with the minor—a third-degree felony;

(ii) engages in any sexual act with the minor involving the genitals of one individual and the mouth or anus of another individual, regardless of the sex of either participant—a third-degree felony;

(iii) causes the penetration, however slight, of the genital or anal opening of the minor by any foreign object, substance, instrument, or device, including a part of the human body, with the intent to cause substantial emotional or bodily pain to any individual or with the intent to arouse or gratify the sexual desire of any individual, regardless of the sex of any participant—a third-degree felony; or

(iv) touches the anus, buttocks, pubic area, or any part of the genitals of the minor, or touches the breast of a female minor, or otherwise takes indecent liberties with the minor, with the intent to cause substantial emotional or bodily pain to any individual or with the intent to arouse or gratify the sexual desire of any individual regardless of the sex of any participant—a class A misdemeanor.

§ 76-5-401.1. Sexual abuse of a minor. Effective August 5, 2018: Here, a "minor" is an individual who is 14 years of age or older, but younger than 16 years of age. An individual commits sexual abuse of a minor if the individual is four years or more older than the minor and (under circumstances not amounting to rape, object rape, forcible sodomy, aggravated sexual assault, unlawful sexual activity with a minor, or an attempt to commit any of those offenses) the individual touches the anus, buttocks, pubic area, or any part of the genitals of the minor, or touches the breast of a female minor, or otherwise takes indecent liberties with the minor, with the intent to cause substantial emotional or bodily pain to any individual or with the intent to arouse or gratify the sexual desire of any individual regardless of the sex of any participant. This is a class A misdemeanor.

§ 76-5-401.3. Unlawful adolescent sexual activity. Effective September 5, 2017: Here, "Adolescent" means a person in the transitional phase of human physical and psychological growth and development between childhood and adulthood who is 12 years of age or older, but under 18 years of age. "Unlawful adolescent sexual activity" means sexual activity between adolescents under circumstances not amounting to rape, rape of a child, object rape, object rape of a child, forcible sodomy, sodomy on a child, aggravated sexual assault, sexual abuse of a child, or incest. Unlawful adolescent sexual activity for Adolescents of various ages is:

17-year-old and a 12- or 13-year-old: third-degree felony

16-year-old and a 12-year-old: third-degree felony

16-year-old and a 13-year-old: class A misdemeanor

14 or 15-year-old and a 12-year-old: class A misdemeanor

17-year-old and a 14-year-old: class B misdemeanor

15-year-old and a 13-year-old: class B misdemeanor

12- or 13-year-old and a 12- or 13-year-old: class C misdemeanor

14-year-old and a 13-year-old: class C misdemeanor

=== Vermont ===
The age of consent in Vermont is 16.

Title 13 V.S.A. § 3252.

Sexual assault:

§ 3252(c) No person shall engage in a sexual act with a child who is under the age of 16, except:

1. where the persons are married to each other and the sexual act is consensual; or
2. where the person is less than 19 years old, the child is at least 15 years old, and the sexual act is consensual.

However it rises to 18 if the person is related to the minor or in a position of authority over him.

(d) No person shall engage in a sexual act with a child who is under the age of 18 and is entrusted to the actor's care by authority of law or is the actor's child, grandchild, foster child, adopted child, or stepchild.

=== Virginia ===
The age of consent in Virginia is 18, with a close-in-age exception that allows teenagers aged 15 to 17 to engage in sexual acts but only with a partner younger than 18.

The state code defines felony statutory rape as crimes against those under 15, while adults who have sex with minors over 15 can be prosecuted for a misdemeanor offense, "contributing to the delinquency of a minor."

The legal age for non-penetrative sexual contact is 15.

Section § 18.2-63 of the Code refers to minors younger than 15, while § 18.2-371 is about 15-, 16- and 17-year-olds.

Section 18.2-63 states in part:

If any person carnally knows, without the use of force, a child thirteen years of age or older but under fifteen years of age, such person shall be guilty of ... felony ... For the purposes of this section, (i) a child under the age of thirteen years shall not be considered a consenting child and (ii) "carnal knowledge" includes the acts of sexual intercourse, cunnilingus, fellatio, analingus, anal intercourse, and animate and inanimate object sexual penetration.

Consensual sex where one partner is 15, 16 or 17 and the other is over 18 is a class 1 misdemeanor.

§ 18.2-371. Causing or encouraging acts rendering children delinquent, abused, etc.; penalty; abandoned infant.

Any person 18 years of age or older, including the parent of any child, who (i) willfully contributes to, encourages, or causes any act, omission, or condition which renders a child delinquent, in need of services, in need of supervision, or abused or neglected as defined in § 16.1-228, or (ii) engages in consensual sexual intercourse with a child 15 or older not his spouse, child, or grandchild, shall be guilty of a Class 1 misdemeanor.

As of 2013 the state was attempting to prosecute a 47-year-old man who had oral sex with a 17-year-old girl with a "crimes against nature" law, an anti-sodomy which forbids people from engaging in anal and oral sex and makes these acts a felony offense. The 47-year-old had been convicted under a misdemeanor offense and his lawyers did not challenge that conviction. In addition, the man had to serve one year in prison and register as a sex offender due to the sodomy charge. In March 2013 the U.S. Court of Appeals overturned the sodomy conviction, saying it was unconstitutional according to the 2003 Lawrence v. Texas decision. Attorney General of Virginia Ken Cuccinelli asked the U.S. Supreme Court to do a rehearing, arguing that the state's sodomy laws may still constitutionally apply to 16- and 17-year-olds. In October of that year the Supreme Court denied the petition.

=== Washington ===
The age of consent in Washington is 16 with exceptions under different circumstances.

RCW 9A.44.096 identifies situations in which the age of consent is higher. The age of consent is 18 for sex between foster parents and their foster children. It is 21 for sex between school teachers or administration employees and their students. It is 18 where the older person is 5 years or more older and in a significant relationship with the younger person and abuses that relationship to have the sexual contact.

There are also laws restricting immoral communication with persons under 18, but they do not affect the effective age of consent because they apply only to communications for the purpose of committing an illegal sexual act. This was decided in rulings by the Washington Court of Appeals and the Washington Supreme Court in the cases of State v. Danforth, 56 Wn. App. 133, 782 P.2d 1091 (1989) and State v. McNallie, 120 Wn.2d 925, 846 P.2d 1358 (1993), and State v. Luther, 65 Wn. App. 424 (1992).

==== History of sexting legislation in Washington ====
The following act affected laws around underage sexual activity (sexting), but the age of consent for sexual activity was unaffected. Child pornography laws in Washington were updated in 2019 under the Responsible Teen Communications Act (House Bill 1742), which stipulated that people under the age of 18 would not face charges for possessing nudes of themselves; possessing or distributing sexual images of another person aged 13 to 17 would be a misdemeanor; and possessing sexual images of anyone 12 or under would still be classed as a felony. A minor 13 to 17 selling sexual content of themselves is now a misdemeanor, and selling sexual content of another minor is a felony. Noel Frame sponsored the legislation; it was signed into law on April 24. Before the passage of the act, possession of any explicit images of anyone under 18 could be treated as a felony and/or require sex offender registration.

=== West Virginia ===
The age of consent in West Virginia is 16.

§ 61-8B-5. Sexual assault in the third degree.

(a) A person is guilty of sexual assault in the third degree when:

(2) The person, being sixteen years old or more, engages in sexual intercourse or sexual intrusion with another person who is less than sixteen years old and who is at least four years younger than the defendant and is not married to the defendant.

=== Wisconsin ===
The age of consent in Wisconsin is 18 and there is no close-in-age exception. There is, however, a marital exception which allows a person to have sex with a minor 16 or older if they are married to the minor. If the minor is below 16 both sexual intercourse and any sexual contact are a felony; sexual intercourse with a minor 16–17 by a perpetrator who is not married to the minor is a Class A misdemeanor. However, Wisconsin has a child enticement law that prohibits people of any age from taking people under 18 to a private area such as a room and exposing a sex organ to them or having the minor expose their sex organ to them. This is a Class B or C felony. 948.09 Sexual intercourse with a child age 16 or older. Whoever has sexual intercourse with a child who is not the defendant's spouse and who has attained the age of 16 years is guilty of a Class A misdemeanor.

948.02 Sexual assault of a child. ( ... ) (2) Second degree sexual assault. Whoever has sexual contact or sexual intercourse with a person who has not attained the age of 16 years is guilty of a Class C felony.

If the minor is below 16 marriage to the minor by the accused is not a defense.

948.02(4) Marriage not a bar to prosecution. A defendant shall not be presumed to be incapable of violating this section because of marriage to the complainant.

Sexual intercourse with a child younger than 13 carries the highest penalties, it is a Class B felony. 948.02 (e) Whoever has sexual contact with a child who has not attained the age of 13 years is guilty of a class b felony.

Wisconsin law contains an unusual provision making it a Class F felony for a person responsible for a child under the age of 16 years such as a parent to not prevent their child from having sexual contact with another person if it was realistically possible for them to do so and they were aware that the other person intended to have sex with their child. (3) Failure to act. A person responsible for the welfare of a child who has not attained the age of 16 years is guilty of a Class F felony if that person has knowledge that another person intends to have, is having or has had sexual intercourse or sexual contact with the child, is physically and emotionally capable of taking action which will prevent the intercourse or contact from taking place or being repeated, fails to take that action and the failure to act exposes the child to an unreasonable risk that intercourse or contact may occur between the child and the other person or facilitates the intercourse or contact that does occur between the child and the other person.

Child Enticement. Section 948.07, Wisconsin Statutes, prohibits causing or enticing a child into any vehicle, building, room, or secluded place with the intent to: commit an act of first or second-degree sexual assault; cause the child to engage in prostitution; expose a sex organ to the child or cause the child to expose a sex organ; or take pictures or make audio recordings of the child engaging in sexually explicit conduct (Class BC felony).

=== Wyoming ===
The age of consent in Wyoming is 17.

In the cases of Pierson v. State and Moore v. State, the Wyoming Supreme Court held that sexual activity with minors aged 16 or 17 could be charged under Section 14-3-105 of Wyoming Statutes. That statute was repealed in 2007 and re-codified as Section 6-2-316, which provides, in pertinent part as follows:

6-2-316. Sexual abuse of a minor in the third degree. (a) Except under circumstance constituting sexual abuse of a minor in the first or second degree as defined by W.S. 6-2-314 and 6–2–315, an actor commits the crime of sexual abuse of a minor in the third degree if: ... (iv) Being seventeen (17) years of age or older, the actor knowingly takes immodest, immoral or indecent liberties with a victim who is less than seventeen (17) years of age and the victim is at least four (4) years younger than the actor.

== Territorial laws ==
=== American Samoa ===
It is an offense in American Samoa to engage in sexual acts with a person under the age of 16.

=== Guam ===
The age of consent in Guam is 16.

§ 25.25. Third Degree Criminal Sexual Conduct.

(a) A person is guilty of criminal sexual conduct in the third degree if the person engages in sexual penetration with another person and if any of the following circumstances exists:

(1) that other person is at least fourteen (14) years of age and under sixteen (16) years of age

( ... )

=== Northern Mariana Islands ===
The age of consent in the Northern Mariana Islands is 16, according to Sections 1306–1309 of the Commonwealth Code. There is a close-in-age exemption permitting minors below age 16 to engage in sexual activity with those less than three years older. Under the same provisions, it is also illegal for any person aged 16 or older to aid, encourage, induce or cause minors under 13 to engage in any sexual contact with anyone else, or minors aged 13–15 and at least 3 years younger than the offender to engage in sexual penetration with another person.

The age of consent rises to 18 when the older partner – being age 18 or older – is the parent, stepparent, adopted parent, or legal guardian of the younger person, or when the older partner has or occupies a position of authority over the younger person. This does not apply for minors aged 16 or 17 as long as the older partner is less than three years older and is not the younger person's parent, stepparent, adopted parent or legal guardian. According to section 1317, a position of authority "means an employer, youth leader, scout leader, coach, teacher, counselor, school administrator, religious leader, doctor, nurse, psychologist, guardian ad litem, babysitter, or a substantially similar position, and a police officer or probation officer other than when the officer is exercising custodial control" over a person under 18.

According to Section 1310, affirmative defenses for the crimes outlined in Sections 1306–1309 exists for consensual activity between legal spouses and for cases where the defendant reasonably believed that a minor age 13 or older was of legal age.

Sections 1303 and 1304 of the Commonwealth Code also criminalize sexual activity with people aged 18 or 19, if they are "committed to the custody of the Department of Public Health and Environmental Services under the Commonwealth's civil or criminal laws, and the offender is the legal guardian of the person".

=== Puerto Rico ===
The age of consent in Puerto Rico is 16.

Article 142.- Sexual Assault.- Any person who performs sexual penetration, whether vaginal, anal, oral-genital, digital or instrumental under any of the following circumstances shall incur a second degree felony:

(a) When the victim has not attained the age of sixteen (16) years at the time of the commission of the crime

( ... )

Article 144.- Lewd Acts.- Any person who without the intention to consummate the crime of sexual assault described in Article 142 submits another person to an act that tends to awaken, excite or satisfy the sexual passion or desire of the accused, under any of the following circumstances hereinbelow, shall incur a third degree felony.

(a) When the victim has not attained the age of sixteen (16) years at the time of the commission of the crime

( ... )

=== United States Virgin Islands ===
Paraphrasing Virgin Islands Code: V.I.C. § 1700–1709 Virgin Islands Code and appeals records Francis vs. VI NOTE: "mistake of fact as to the victim's age is not a defense". The age of consent is 18. There is however a close-in-age exemption that allows minors 16 and 17 years old to consent with someone no more than five years older than themselves and minors 13 to 15 years old to consent with one another, but not with anyone 16 or over.

Article § 1700. Aggravated rape in the first degree bans sexual intercourse or sodomy with a child under 13. Sexual acts with minors are aggravated by the use of force, intimidation, or the perpetrator's position of authority, and by the fact that the minor, being under 16 and not the perpetrator's spouse, is residing in the same household as the perpetrator.(see Article § 1700, Article § 1702, Article § 1708).

Other relevant articles of the criminal code are:

- § 1702. Rape in the second degree

(a) Any person over 18 years of age who perpetrates under circumstances not amounting to rape in the first degree, an act of sexual intercourse or sodomy with a person not the perpetrator's spouse who is at least 16 years but less than 18 years of age, and the perpetrator is 5 years or older than the victim, is guilty of rape in the second degree and shall be imprisoned not more than 10 years.

- § 1703. Rape in the third degree

Any person under 18 years of age but over 16 years of age who perpetrates an act of sexual intercourse or sodomy with a person not the perpetrator's spouse who is under 16 years of age but over 13 years of age, under circumstances not amounting to rape in the first degree, is guilty of rape in the third degree and shall be subject to the jurisdiction of the Family Division of the Superior Court

"Sexual contact", that is, non-penetrative sex, defined as "the intentional touching of a person's intimate parts, whether directly or through clothing, to arouse or to gratify the sexual desires of any person" is not permitted with children under 16, but a close-in-age exemption allows those aged at least 13 to engage in such acts with partners under 18.

- § 1708. Unlawful sexual contact in the first degree

A person who engages in sexual contact with a person not the perpetrator's spouse— (..)(2) when the other person is under thirteen years of age;

- § 1709. Unlawful sexual contact in the second degree

A person over eighteen years of age who engages in sexual contact with a person not the perpetrator's spouse who is over thirteen but under sixteen years of age is guilty of unlawful sexual contact in the second degree and shall be imprisoned not more than 1 year

=== United States Minor Outlying Islands ===
Baker Island, Howland Island, Jarvis Island, Johnston Atoll, Kingman Reef, Palmyra Atoll and Wake Island, are under the jurisdiction of the US Federal Government Department of the Interior, as part of the Pacific Islands Heritage Marine National Monument. As such, all US Federal laws regarding age of consent would be applicable.

Midway Atoll is under the jurisdiction of the US Federal Government Department of the Interior (administered as a National Wildlife Refuge). As such, all US Federal laws regarding age of consent would be applicable.

== See also ==
- Adolescent sexuality in the United States
- Age of consent
- Age-of-consent reform
- Ages of consent in Africa
- Ages of consent in Asia
- Ages of consent in Europe
- Ages of consent in North America
- Ages of consent in Oceania
- Ages of consent in South America
- Age of marriage in the United States
- Child sexual abuse
- Comprehensive sex education
- Fantasy defense
- Jailbait

== Works cited ==
- Smith, Brittany Logino and Glen A. Kercher. "Adolescent Sexual Behavior and the Law" (Archive). Crime Victims' Institute, Criminal Justice Center, Sam Houston State University. March 2011.
