= Eric S. Rosen =

American judge (born 1953)

Eric Rosen
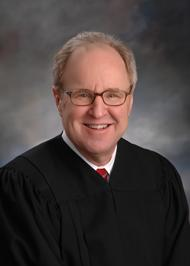

Chief Justice of the Kansas Supreme Court
- Incumbent
- Assumed office January 2, 2026
- Preceded by: Marla Luckert

Justice of the Kansas Supreme Court
- Incumbent
- Assumed office November 18, 2005
- Appointed by: Kathleen Sebelius
- Preceded by: Robert L. Gernon

Personal details
- Born: May 25, 1953 (age 73) Topeka, Kansas, U.S.
- Party: Democratic
- Education: University of Kansas (BA); Washburn University (JD)

Eric S. Rosen (born May 25, 1953) is the chief justice of the Kansas Supreme Court. He was appointed to the court by Governor Kathleen Sebelius in 2005.

== Early life and education ==
Rosen was born May 25, 1953, in Topeka, Kansas. He earned his Bachelor's and a master's degree with honors at the University of Kansas and his Juris Doctor at Washburn University School of Law in 1984. He is Jewish.

== Career ==
Before attending law school, Rosen worked as a social worker for Topeka Public Schools for three years and chaired the social work department for two years. After graduating from Washburn he became an assistant public defender. Rosen later served as an assistant district attorney in Shawnee County, Kansas, and eventually took the office of associate general counsel to the Kansas Securities Commission before entering the private practice of law in 1990.

In 1993 Rosen took his first judgeship on the District Court for Shawnee County. He was appointed Chief Justice to the Kansas Sentencing Commission in July 2002. During this time Rosen was a member of Koch Crime Commission, lectured at the Menninger School of Law and Psychiatry, 2004-05 President of the Sam A. Crow Inns of Court and was appointed to the presidential commission charged with commemorating the 50th anniversary of the Brown v. Board of Education decision.

In 2005, Governor Kathleen Sebelius appointed Rosen from a field of twelve applicants to the Kansas Supreme Court to replace Justice Robert Gernon, who died from cancer. He faced his first retention vote in the 2008 election. He became chief justice in January 2026.

== Personal life ==
Rosen is married to Elizabeth A. "Libby" Rosen, and has four children and five grandchildren. He's an active member of the Topeka High School Booster Club, Indian Woods Neighborhood Association, Temple Beth Shalom, and YMCA.

== Awards ==
- Martin Luther King Living the Dream Humanitarian Award (2002)
- Attorney General's Victim's Service Award for Outstanding Judge (2000)
- Topeka Capital Journal Kansan of Distinction For Law (1999)

== See also ==
- List of Jewish American jurists

Legal offices
Preceded by Robert L. Gernon	Justice of the Kansas Supreme Court; 2005–present	Incumbent
Preceded by Marla Luckert	Chief Justice of the Kansas Supreme Court; 2026–present	Incumbent
