= Marla Luckert =

American judge (born 1955)

Chief Justice of the Kansas Supreme Court
- In office December 17, 2019 – January 2, 2026
- Preceded by: Lawton Nuss
- Succeeded by: Eric S. Rosen

Justice of the Kansas Supreme Court
- In office January 13, 2003 – March 27, 2026
- Appointed by: Bill Graves
- Preceded by: Fred Six
- Succeeded by: Chris Jayaram

Personal details
- Born: July 20, 1955 (age 71) Goodland, Kansas, U.S.
- Education: Washburn University (BA, JD)

Marla Jo Luckert (born July 20, 1955) is a former associate justice and chief justice of the Kansas Supreme Court. She was appointed by Governor Bill Graves on November 20, 2002, and sworn into office on January 13, 2003. She served as chief justice of the court from 2019 to 2026. She retired in 2026.

== Personal life ==
Marla J. Luckert was born in Goodland, Kansas. At Washburn University she earned a Bachelor of Arts in history in 1977 and a Juris Doctor from Washburn University School of Law in 1980.

== Professional life ==
After law school, Luckert joined the law firm of Goodell, Stratton, Edmonds and Palmer in Topeka, Kansas. She also served as an adjunct professor of law at Washburn. Luckert was appointed by Governor Joan Finney to the Third Judicial District Court in 1992. In 2000, she became chief judge of the Third Judicial Court. In 2003 she was appointed to the Kansas Supreme Court by Governor Bill Graves.

Luckert has served as president of the Kansas Bar Association, the Kansas District Judges Association, the Kansas Women Attorneys Association, the Topeka Bar Association, the Sam A. Crow Inn of Court, and the Women Attorneys Association of Topeka. Luckert is a Fellow of the American Bar Foundation and the Kansas Bar Foundation.

On December 17, 2019, Luckert became chief justice of the Kansas Supreme Court after the retirement of then-Chief Justice Lawton Nuss.

Luckert retired from the court on March 28, 2026.

== Awards ==
- YWCA Woman of Excellence Award (1996)
- Kansas Bar Association Outstanding Service Award (1990)
- Kansas Association of Defense Counsel's Distinguished Service Award (1990)

Legal offices
Preceded by Fred Six	Justice of the Kansas Supreme Court; 2003–2026	Succeeded by Chris Jayaram
Preceded by Lawton Nuss	Chief Justice of the Kansas Supreme Court; 2019–2026	Succeeded by Eric S. Rosen
