= Kansas Women Attorneys Association =

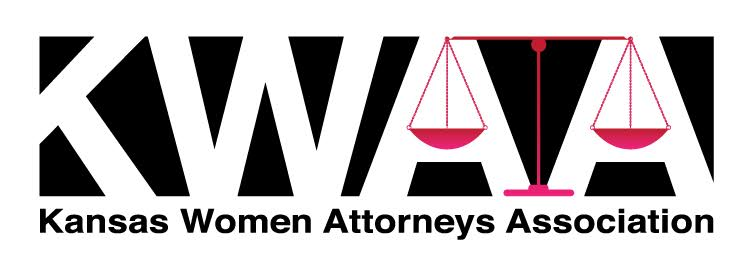
- Abbreviation: KWAA
- Formation: 1994
- Type: Bar Association
- Purpose: women's professional development
- Members: 300+
- Website: www.kswomenattorneys.com
- Formerly called: Jennie Mitchell Kellogg Circle

The Kansas Women Attorneys Association (KWAA) is a voluntary, statewide bar organization devoted to advancing women in the legal profession through networking, service, and continued education. The organization was formally founded in 1994, and currently has over 300 members.

== History ==
In 1989, the Topeka Women Attorneys Association hosted the first Kansas state meeting for female attorneys, led by Marla Luckert. From 1989 to 1994, the Wichita Women Attorneys Association and Topeka Women Attorneys Association (now Women Attorneys Association of Topeka) shared responsibility for this annual meeting.

In 1993, conference attendees determined a need for a permanent, statewide organization for female attorneys. The Jennie Mitchell Kellogg Circle, named for Jennie Mitchell Kellogg, was formed the following year around the purposes of:

1. Providing information to women seeking increased bar involvement, judicial positions, and professional development; and
2. Providing a structure around which the annual conference could be organized.

The organization later changed its name to the Kansas Women Attorneys Association. Today, KWAA continues to host the annual Lindsborg Conference, as well as encourage monthly meetings among its regional districts and their local women attorney groups.

== Membership ==
Membership to KWAA is open to all attorneys, judges, and law students, regardless of gender. This membership allows individuals to access a discounted price to the Lindsborg conference, receive legal updates and answers to questions through the listserv, and network with fellow attorneys. The 365 members are formally organized into 12 location-based districts but also have the option to join practice area groups. Governance for the organization is run through five committees (Awards Committee, District Representatives, KWAA Council, Lindsborg Conference Committee, and Past Presidents Council) and 26 subcommittees. The membership year runs from August 1 to July 31 each year.

== Lindsborg annual conference ==
The annual KWAA conference has been held in Lindsborg, Kansas since 1989. Today, the conference spans three days in July and is held at Bethany College. Conference attendees have the opportunity to participate in continuing legal education courses, as well as a number of networking and social activities.

== Jennie Mitchell Kellogg Achievement Award ==
The Jennie Mitchell Kellogg Achievement Award was first presented in 1999, and has been a yearly staple since. This award seeks to recognize a member who:

1. Achieves professional excellence in her practice area;
2. Influences other women to pursue a career in law;
3. Opens doors that have been historically closed; and
4. Advances opportunities for women in her field.

This award has been presented to notable women like Christel Marquardt, Marla Luckert, and Sally Pokorny.

== Historic preservation efforts ==
The Kansas Women Attorneys Association works diligently to preserve and archive historical information pertaining to the female practice of law in Kansas. Research includes a complete list of female attorneys dating back to 1881. These research efforts are often aided by area law schools, including Washburn University School of Law, University of Kansas School of Law, and University of Missouri--Kansas City School of Law.

One of the projects with its sister organization, the Women Attorneys Association of Topeka, was the production of the book Journeys on the Road Less Travelled: Kansas Women Attorneys. The entire book may be found online through the Washburn University School of Law Digital Collection.
