= Robert L. Gernon =

American judge from Kansas

Robert Lawrence Gernon (July 29, 1943 – March 30, 2005), was a district judge in Kansas 22nd District, from 1979 to 1988.

Born in Brown County, Kansas, he studied law at Washburn University, from which he graduated in 1969 after his 1966 University of Kansas School of Business degree.

Justice Gernon was also a trial advocacy instructor at University of Kansas School of Law, a judge on the Kansas Court of Appeals, 1988–2003, and Kansas Supreme Court Justice, 2003–2005.

He also served as a coach, mentor and tutor to Sigma Nu fraternity chapter members in Lawrence, Kansas, and championed the LEAD program, which served as a framework for ongoing Emily Taylor Women's Resource Center (ETWRC) peer mentoring programs.

In 1990, Judge Gernon and his wife Sharon Winslow Gernon were jointly awarded the Kansas University Alumni Association's (KUAA) Mildred Clodfelter Alumni Award for "sustained volunteer service to the University at the local level."
