= Cordell D. Meeks Sr. =

American lawyer

Cordell D. Meeks Sr. (September 25, 1914 – December 8, 1987) was the first black District Court judge in Kansas.

== Biography ==
He was born in Little Rock, Arkansas on September 25, 1914, to his parents Mossie Ella Meeks and Charles Arthur Meeks. He moved to Wyandotte County when he was thirteen. His father was a teacher and a Minister for the Church of God in Christ and his mother was a missionary and a housewife. After the Stock Market Crash of 1929, his father left Kansas to look for work; although For a while he would send money and letters, he later stopped and eventually lost all contact with his family.

Living in Kansas City, Kansas, Meeks attended Northeast Jr. High School, which was the only Jr. High for black students in the city, and then Sumner High School, where he was elected president of his senior class. He had known since eighth grade that he wanted to be a lawyer, so after high school he studied politics at the University of Kansas in Lawrence, KS. He went on to receive his L.L.B. and his Doctor of Jurisprudence from KU Law and graduated in 1939. During his time at KU, he worked on political campaigns and also spoke out against discrimination on campus He was the second black man elected to the Student Council and was elected President of his fraternity Alpha Phi Alpha. Years later, he became the Director of the University of Kansas National Alumni Association.

== Career ==
In 1940 he opened a small law firm out of his own home in Kansas City, and continued to practice law for many years. Along with that he was Assistant County Attorney, County Commissioner for nineteen years, chairman of the county's Board for five years. He was elected to Board of Directors of the National Association of Counties in 1969 and 1970. . He was the Vice President and Director of Douglas State Bank, was twice elected as delegate to the Democratic National Convention, and was Trustee of AME Church. He was also the director of the Regional Health and Welfare Council, and he helped organize low-income housing in Kansas City called Gateway Plaza Homes and Gateway Plaza Homes East.

In November 1972 he was elected the first black District Court Judge in Kansas and served two successive four-year terms. He wrote an autobiographyTo Heaven Through Hell: An Autobiography of the First Black District Court Judge of Kansas, published in 1986 five years after he retired in 1980.

Meeks married Cellastine Brown on December 22, 1940, and together they had four children: Marlene, Cordell Jr., Marcena, and Marquita. Cordell Jr. followed in his father's footsteps and became very active in law and politics. Marlene and Marcena were teachers and Marquita was a musician. He died on December 8, 1987. His wife compiled many of his papers and speeches and donated them to the Spencer Research Library at the University of Kansas in Lawrence.

== See also ==
- List of African-American jurists
- List of first minority male lawyers and judges in Kansas
