= Chris Jayaram =

American lawyer and judge

Justice of the Kansas Supreme Court
- Incumbent
- Assumed office August 4, 2026
- Appointed by: Laura Kelly
- Preceded by: Marla Luckert

Personal details
- Born: Krishnan Christopher Jayaram; March 10, 1971 (age 55) New York City, New York, U.S.
- Party: Democratic (1999–2017, 2022–2024); Independent (2017–2022, 2024–present)
- Education: Texas Christian University (attended); University of Kansas (BA); Lewis and Clark College (JD)

Krishnan Christopher Jayaram (born March 10, 1971) is an associate justice of the Kansas Supreme Court. He was appointed by Governor Laura Kelly in July 2026. He previously served as a District Court Judge in Johnson County District Court beginning in 2021 and worked as a civil litigation attorney. He was sworn into office in August 2026.

== Early life and education ==
Jayaram studied for two years at Texas Christian University, earned a Bachelor of Arts degree in environmental science from the University of Kansas and a Juris Doctor from Northwestern School of Law at Lewis and Clark College in 1997.

Legal offices
Preceded by Marla Luckert	Justice of the Kansas Supreme Court; 2026–present	Incumbent
