= Kansas Supreme Court =

Highest court in the U.S. state of Kansas

- Seal of the Kansas Supreme Court
- Interactive map of Kansas Supreme Court
- Location: Topeka, Kansas
- Composition method: Missouri plan with retention elections
- Authorised by: Kansas Constitution
- Appeals to: Supreme Court of the United States
- Judge term length: 6 years
- Number of positions: 7
- Website: Official website

Chief Justice
- Currently: Eric Rosen
- Since: January 2, 2026

The Kansas Supreme Court is the highest judicial authority in the U.S. state of Kansas. Composed of seven justices, the court supervises the legal profession, administers the judicial branch, and serves as the state court of last resort in the appeals process.

== Functions ==
=== Judicial ===
The Kansas Supreme Court's most important duty is being the state court of last resort and the highest judicial authority in the state of Kansas. The Court rarely conducts a trial. Its judicial responsibilities include hearing direct appeals from the district courts in the most serious criminal cases and appeals in any case in which a statute has been held unconstitutional. The Court has the authority to review cases decided by the Court of Appeals and the ability to transfer cases to the U.S. Supreme Court.

=== Administration ===
The Kansas Supreme Court must adopt and submit to the Kansas Legislature an annual budget for the entire judicial branch of Kansas government.

=== Supervision ===
According to the Kansas Constitution, the Court has general administrative authority over all Kansas courts. Its rules govern the appellate practice in the Kansas Court of Appeals and the Supreme Court. It sets the procedures in the district courts. It also provides oversight to the legal profession by setting rules that provide for the examination and admission of attorneys within the state, the code of professional responsibility which governs the conduct of attorneys, and include the canons of judicial ethics which regulate the conduct of judges. Lastly it sets the rules for the examination and certification of official court reports. To ensure compliance the Court may discipline attorneys, judges, and nonjudicial employees.

== Justices ==
=== Selection process ===
When a vacancy opens up on the Kansas Supreme Court, the Kansas Supreme Court Nominating Commission submits a list of three qualified individuals to the Governor of Kansas. The commission is composed of five lawyer members and four non-lawyer members. One lawyer and one non-lawyer member must be from each of Kansas's congressional districts, and one additional lawyer member who serves as the chairperson. Lawyer members are elected by their peers in each individual congressional district while the non-lawyer members are appointed by the governor.

The Court of Appeals used the same process until 2013 when the Kansas Legislature changed the process to allow the governor to nominate a candidate who is then approved by the Kansas Senate.

==== Proposed changes to the selection process ====
Periodically, Kansas legislators propose to change the way Kansas Supreme Court justices are selected, which would require an amendment to the state constitution. As recently as February 2016, such an attempt was defeated in the legislature.

Stephen Ware, a law professor at the University of Kansas, is a critic of the way justices are selected in Kansas. In a 2007 paper, he wrote, "Kansas is the only state in the union that gives the members of its bar majority control over the selection of state supreme court justices."

However, five other states — Florida, Missouri, South Dakota, Tennessee, and Wyoming — and the District of Columbia have merit selection commissions where a majority of the members are attorneys.

=== Eligibility requirements ===
A nominee must be:

- at least 30 years old; and (there is no maximum age) Article 3 § 7
- a lawyer admitted to practice in Kansas and engaged in the practice of law for at least 10 years, whether as a lawyer, judge, or full-time teacher at an accredited law school.

If a person meets these requirements and wants to be considered for the office, they must complete a detailed nomination form summarizing their educational, professional, community, and financial background. The Kansas Supreme Court Nominating Commission reviews the nomination forms and chooses which potential nominees merit an interview.

The interviews are conducted in the Supreme Court's Conference Room in Topeka. Generally the interview process will take a day and a half. There is no official set of questions, but topics such as the potential nominees' legal scholarship, professional experience, writing ability, and community service are normally covered. The commission also receives letters of recommendation and other background information on the candidates. Once the interviews are complete, the commission enters into discussion to reduce the list to the top six to eight nominees. Then the commission votes by secret ballot until a list of three nominees is chosen by majority vote to submit to the Governor.

=== Appointments ===
The governor then selects one of the three from the commission's list to become a justice. If the Governor fails to make an appointment within 60 days the choice is then made by the Chief Justice of the Kansas Supreme Court. After the first year in office, the justice undergoes a retention vote in the next general election. The justice receiving approval from a majority of electors remain in office for a 6-year term. After the conclusion of each term the justice must face another retention vote. Retirement is mandatory at age 75 or upon completion of the justice's current term.

The justice who has the longest continuous service is designated by the Kansas Constitution as the chief justice, unless the justice declines or resigns the position. The chief justice's duty is to exercise the administrative authority of the court. This merit system or Missouri Plan has been used in Kansas since 1958, voted in by Kansans upset when Governor Fred Hall resigned after losing the gubernatorial primary so he could be appointed to the Supreme Court by his successor Governor John McCuish.

In 2026, there was a failed constitutional amendment vote to change the appointment process from the Missouri Plan to popular election. The measure was defeated 61.32% to 38.68%

=== Current justices ===
The Kansas Supreme Court has seven current justices.

| Seat | Name | Born | Start | Term ends | Mandatory retirement (Note: Justices must retire by the age of 75. However, Justices are allowed to serve out the remainder of their term during which they turn 75.) | Appointer | Law school |
|---|---|---|---|---|---|---|---|
| 4 | Eric S. Rosen, Chief Justice | March 25, 1953 (age 73) | November 18, 2005 | 2032 | January 10, 2033 | Kathleen Sebelius (D) | Washburn |
| 2 | Daniel Biles | August 12, 1952 (age 74) | March 6, 2009 | 2028 | January 8, 2029 | Kathleen Sebelius (D) | Washburn |
| 7 | Caleb Stegall | September 20, 1971 (age 55) | December 5, 2014 | 2028 | January 14, 2047 | Sam Brownback (R) | Kansas |
| 3 | K. J. Wall | November 17, 1970 (age 55) | August 3, 2020 | 2028 | January 14, 2047 | Laura Kelly (D) | Kansas |
| 1 | Melissa Standridge | July 12, 1962 (age 64) | December 14, 2020 | 2028 | January 14, 2041 | Laura Kelly (D) | UMKC |
| 6 | Larkin Walsh | 1978 or 1979 (age 47–48) | September 17, 2025 | 2032 | January 8, 2057 | Laura Kelly (D) | Kansas |
| 5 | Chris Jayaram | March 10, 1971 (age 55) | August 4, 2026 | 2028 | January 14, 2047 | Laura Kelly (D) | Lewis and Clark |

=== Removing a justice ===
Due to the checks and balances of the judicial branch with the legislative and executive branches, it is difficult to remove a Justice. Usually a Justice either dies, retires by choice, or retires after surpassing the state age limit of 75. A Justice may be removed by impeachment and conviction as specified in Article 3 of the Kansas Constitution. Justices can also be forced to retire upon certification to the governor after a hearing by the Supreme Court Nominating Commission that the Justice is so incapacitated as to be unable to perform the duties of the office.

== History ==
Following the passage of the Kansas–Nebraska Act by the United States Congress in Washington, D.C. in 1854, and the subsequent organization of the new federal Territory of Kansas (1854-1861) out of the previous old Missouri Territory (1812-1821), the new 14th President Franklin Pierce (1804-1869, served 1853-1857), appointed Samuel Dexter Lecompte (1814-1888), as the first chief justice of the Supreme Court of the Kansas Territory. In January 1861 with the admission of Kansas as the 34th state in the Union, the current Kansas Supreme Court began.

In 1900, a constitutional amendment was made to the Kansas Constitution changing the complement of the high court from three justices to seven. Initially the court worked in two separate divisions in an attempt to catch up with the four years long heavy case backlog that had built up. By 1922 this had succeeded and the court sat complete with all seven justices hearing cases and disposing of cases "just as fast as they can be presented".

== Notable cases ==
=== State v. Limon ===
In State v. Limon (2005), the Kansas Supreme Court unanimously struck down part of a law that sentenced Matthew Limon to prison over a decade longer than a heterosexual would have received because of different age of consent laws for homosexuals.

=== Montoy v. Kansas ===
The court ruled in 2005 that the $2.7 billion in school funding was inadequate and distributed unfairly. It then recommended the Kansas legislature increase funding to schools and change the way the money was distributed. Many Republicans saw this as an act of judicial activism leading to some calls for changes in how justices are selected.

=== Kansas v. Marsh ===
The Court ruled in Kansas v. Marsh (2006) that the Kansas death penalty was unconstitutional because the Eighth Amendment prohibits imposing death when mitigating and aggravating sentencing factors were equally balanced. The United States Supreme Court disagreed and reversed in a 5–4 decision.

=== Kline v. Tiller ===
The Court unanimously allowed then Attorney General Phill Kline to examine the abortion records of 90 women to investigate possible crimes. It later blocked Kline from pursuing 30 misdemeanor criminal charges against Dr. George Tiller after he lost office. The case was a major issue in the 2006 defeat of Kline by former prosecutor and then-Attorney General Paul J. Morrison whose investigation found no crimes.

=== Hermesmann v. Seyer ===
The Court ruled in Hermesmann v. Seyer (1993) that a woman is entitled to sue the father of her child for child support even if conception occurred as a result of a criminal act, including statutory rape, committed by the woman against the father. It also ruled that a mother's potential culpability under the criminal statutes was of no relevance in determining the father's child support liability.

=== Hodes & Nauser, MDs, PA, et al v. Derek Schmidt, et al. ===
The Court ruled in 2019 that the Kansas Constitution Bill of Rights sets forth rights that are broader than and distinct from the rights in the Fourteenth Amendment to the United States Constitution. Specifically, Section 1 of the Kansas Constitution Bill of Rights affords protection of the right of personal autonomy, which includes the ability to control one's own body, to assert bodily integrity, and to exercise self-determination. This right allows a woman to make her own decisions regarding her body, health, family formation, and family life—decisions that can include whether to continue a pregnancy. The State may only infringe upon the right to decide whether to continue a pregnancy if the State has a compelling interest and has narrowly tailored its actions to that interest. In 2022, Kansas voters rejected a proposed amendment to the state constitution that would have overruled Hodes & Nasuer v. Schmidt.

== See also ==
- Courts of Kansas
- List of justices of the Kansas Supreme Court
