= List of justices of the Kansas Supreme Court =

Following is a list of justices of the Kansas Supreme Court who are currently serving and those previously in office since the beginning of the State of Kansas in 1861. As of 2024, the Kansas Supreme Court has seven justices currently serving on the supreme bench.

== Justices ==
Name	Began active service	Ended active service	Began as Chief Justice	Ended as Chief Justice
Chris Jayaram	August 4, 2026	Present	-	-
Larkin Walsh	September 17, 2025	Present	-	-
Melissa Standridge	December 14, 2020	Present	-	-
K.J. Wall	August 3, 2020	Present	-	-
Evelyn Wilson	January 24, 2020	July 4, 2025	-	-
Caleb Stegall	December 5, 2014	Present	-	-
Nancy Moritz	January 7, 2011	July 29, 2014	-	-
Daniel Biles	March 6, 2009	Present	-	-
Lee A. Johnson	January 8, 2007	September 8, 2019	-	-
Eric S. Rosen	November 18, 2005	Present	January 2, 2026	Present
Carol A. Beier	September 5, 2003	September 18, 2020	-	-
Robert L. Gernon	January 13, 2003	March 30, 2005	-	-
Marla Luckert	January 13, 2003	March 28, 2026	December 17, 2019	January 2, 2026
Lawton Nuss	October 17, 2002	December 17, 2019	August 3, 2010	December 17, 2019
Edward Larson	September 1, 1995	September 4, 2002	-	-
Robert E. Davis	January 11, 1993	January 12, 2009	January 12, 2009	August 3, 2010
Bob Abbott	September 1, 1990	June 6, 2003	-	-
Frederick N. Six	September 1, 1988	January 13, 2003	-	-
Donald L. Allegrucci	January 12, 1987	January 8, 2007	-	-
Tyler C. Lockett	February 11, 1983	January 13, 2003	-	-
Harold S. Herd	March 18, 1979	January 11, 1993	-	-
Kay McFarland	September 19, 1977	September 1, 1995	September 1, 1995	January 12, 2009
Richard Winn Holmes	September 17, 1977	September 1, 1990	September 1, 1990	August 31, 1995
Robert H. Miller	November 1, 1975	September 1, 1988	September 1, 1988	August 31, 1990
David Prager	December 4, 1971	January 12, 1987	January 12, 1987	September 1, 1988
Perry L. Owsley	September 24, 1971	December 31, 1978	-	-
Alex M. Fromme	May 2, 1966	October 25, 1982	-	-
Earl Eugene O'Connor	October 1, 1965	November 10, 1971	-	-
Robert H. Kaul	September 27, 1965	September 17, 1977	-	-
John F. Fontron	March 5, 1964	October 1, 1975	-	-
Schuyler W. Jackson	April 7, 1958	February 8, 1964	-	-
Alfred G. Schroeder	January 14, 1957	September 19, 1977	September 19, 1977	January 12, 1987
Fred Hall	January 3, 1957	April 7, 1958	-	-
Harold R. Fatzer	March 1, 1956	September 1, 1971	September 1, 1971	September 19, 1977
Clair E. Robb	January 10, 1955	August 6, 1965	-	-
William J. Wertz	January 8, 1951	October 1, 1965		
Lloyd M. Kagey	December 4, 1950	January 8, 1951	-	-
William J. Wertz	March 1, 1950	December 4, 1950		
Edward F. Arn	February 21, 1949	March 1, 1950	-	-
Robert T. Price	November 30, 1948	May 1, 1966	May 1, 1966	September 1, 1971
Austin M. Cowan	June 9, 1948	November 30, 1948	-	-
Allen Banks Burch	January 8, 1945	May 31, 1948	-	-
Jay S. Parker	January 11, 1943	January 14, 1957	January 14, 1957	May 1, 1966
Homer Hoch	January 9, 1939	January 30, 1949	-	-
Harry K. Allen	January 11, 1937	January 11, 1943	-	-
Hugo T. Wedell	July 3, 1935	January 10, 1955	-	-
Walter G. Thiele	January 9, 1933	January 3, 1957	January 3, 1957	January 14, 1957
Edward Ray Sloan	April 6, 1931	January 9, 1933	-	-
William A. Smith	December 1, 1930	March 1, 1956	March 1, 1956	January 3, 1957
William D. Jochems	January 4, 1930	December 1, 1930	-	-
William Easton Hutchinson	May 12, 1927	January 9, 1939	-	-
William West Harvey	January 8, 1923	January 8, 1945	January 8, 1945	March 1, 1956
Richard Joseph Hopkins	January 8, 1923	December 27, 1929	-	-
John Marshall	January 11, 1915	March 25, 1931	-	-
John Shaw Dawson	January 11, 1915	January 11, 1937	January 11, 1937	January 8, 1945
Judson S. West	January 9, 1911	January 8, 1923	-	-
Alfred W. Benson	August 1, 1907	January 11, 1915	-	-
Charles Burleigh Graves	August 21, 1905	January 9, 1911	-	-
Silas Wright Porter	July 1, 1905	January 8, 1923	-	-
Clark Allen Smith	December 1, 1904	January 11, 1915	-	-
Henry F. Mason	January 12, 1903	May 4, 1927	-	-
Rousseau Angelus Burch	September 29, 1902	July 1, 1935	July 1, 1935	January 11, 1937
William D. Atkinson	January 1, 1904	December 1, 1904	-	-
John Calvin Pollock	January 15, 1901	December 2, 1903	-	-
Abram Halstead Ellis	January 15, 1901	September 25, 1902	-	-
Adrian Lawrence Greene	January 15, 1901	July 28, 1907	-	-
Edwin Wilber Cunningham	January 15, 1901	August 16, 1905	-	-
David Martin	-	-	April 30, 1895	January 11, 1897
William Redwood Smith	January 9, 1899	July 1, 1905	-	-
Frank Doster	-	-	January 11, 1897	January 12, 1903
Stephen Haley Allen	January 9, 1893	January 9, 1899	-	-
Daniel Mulford Valentine	January 11, 1869	January 9, 1893	-	-
William Agnew Johnston	December 1, 1884	January 12, 1903	January 12, 1903	June 30, 1935
Theodore A. Hurd	April 23, 1884	December 1, 1884	-	-
David J. Brewer	January 9, 1871	April 8, 1884	-	-
Albert H. Horton	-	-	December 31, 1876	April 30, 1895
Jacob Safford	January 9, 1865	January 9, 1871	-	-
Lawrence Dudley Bailey	February 9, 1861	January 11, 1869	-	-
Samuel Austin Kingman	February 9, 1861	January 9, 1865	January 14, 1867	December 30, 1876
Robert Crozier	-	-	January 5, 1864	January 14, 1867
Nelson Cobb	-	-	December 28, 1862	January 5, 1864
John Hampton Watson	-	-	Elected November 4, 1862	Election Ruled Void
Thomas Ewing Jr.	-	-	February 9, 1861	November 28, 1862

== See also ==
- Lists of people from Kansas
