= Rousseau Angelus Burch =

American judge (1862–1944)

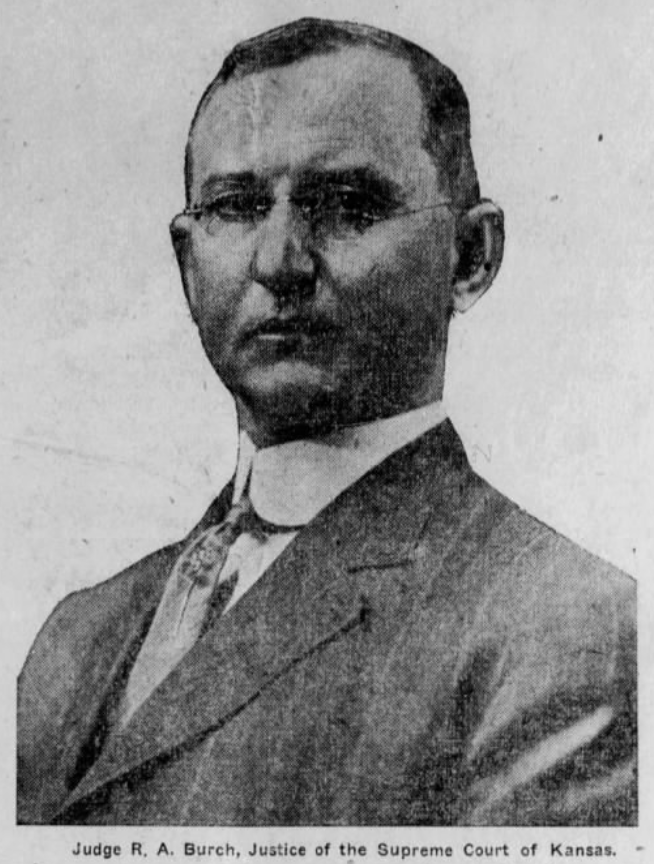
R.A. Burch (circa 1914)

Rousseau Angelus Burch (August 4, 1862 – January 29, 1944) was a justice of the Kansas Supreme Court from September 29, 1902, to July 1, 1935, then chief justice of the Kansas Supreme Court from July 1, 1935, to January 11, 1937.

== Early life and education ==
Burch was born August 4, 1862, in a log cabin in Williamsport, Indiana to Isaac A. Burch and Mary Schoonover Burch, who then moved to Salina, Kansas in 1869.

He graduated from Salina High School in 1879, going on to teach in the local country schools for three terms. He went on to study for two more years at Valparaiso, Indiana, before going on to earn his Master of laws degree in 1885 from the University of Michigan Law School.

He married Clara Louisa Teague (born 1860) September 25, 1889. They lived together in Salina until his supreme court appointment in 1902 when they moved to Topeka, Kansas. They had a son called Angelus Teague Burch and a daughter Winifred Burch Royce who died seven years earlier. She died April 25, 1928, of suspected heart trouble at their home after a long illness.

He was the retiring President of the Social Science Club in Salina, a literary association of educate professional men. He was the Council of the American Law Institute from 1923, and a member of the Ancient Order of United Workmen stating his reason as "it was generally fraternal and reliably beneficiary".

== Career ==
After obtaining his law degree he returned to Salina, Kansas where he practised law until 1902 with his brother Charles Wilkes Burch.

A seat on the supreme court was vacated by the death of Abram Halstead Ellis, and around fifteen names including Burch were put forward for the position with six being selected for consideration by the state committee. The primary selection included Burch and other future supreme court justices Clark Allen Smith and Alfred Washburn Benson, with Burch winning the selection. He decisively won the nomination with the committee voting for him 20 to 10 in favor. He was then appointed by governor William Eugene Stanley to fill the vacancy until the next election.

As well as his work on the court he also taught at the Washburn Law School throughout his service, and he wrote a 24-page book called Two Years' Work of the Kansas Supreme Court that was published in 1914 by the Kansas State Printing Office.

In June 1935, chief justice William Agnew Johnston announced he planned to retire, and Burch would succeed him as senior justice. He did so on July 1, 1935, with Hugo T. Wedell being appointed to fill the vacant position.

He was known for his analytical reasoning and for being clear and concise with it being said he had the "faculty of making himself understood, no matter how obtuse the subject nor how obtuse his audience." During his time on the court he authored over 1900 formal opinions many being regarded as law classics and many being incorporated into legal texts.

He left the court in 1937 to become the Dean of the Washburn Law School, a position later held by Harry K. Allen another supreme court justice. After a car accident his ill heath forced him to retire as dean of the school.

== Health and death ==
In 1939, aged 76, he suffered a stroke and partial paralysis of his right side while at the Astor hotel in New York.

He died, aged 83, at his home in Topeka January 29, 1944.

Legal offices
Preceded by William Agnew Johnston	Chief Justice of the Kansas Supreme Court; 1935–1937	Succeeded by John Shaw Dawson
Preceded by Abram Halstead Ellis	Justice of the Kansas Supreme Court; 1902–1935	Succeeded by Harry K. Allen
