= Albert Horton =

Albert Horton may refer to:

- Albert Clinton Horton (1798–1865), Lieutenant Governor of Texas
- Albert H. Horton (1837–1902), Chief Justice of the Kansas Supreme Court

== See also ==
- Albert Norton
