= Standridge =

Standridge is an English family name. It is habitational name from a place so called in Lancashire. Notable people with the surname include:

- Billy Standridge (1953–2014), American former NASCAR driver
- David Standridge, American politician
- Glenn Standridge, multi-platinum producer, songwriter, DJ and Multi-Instrumentalist; member of Jake and the Phatman
- Greg Standridge (1967–2017), American politician
- Jason Standridge (born 1978), American professional baseball pitcher
- Melissa Standridge (born 1962), American judge on the Kansas Court of Appeals
- Pete Standridge (1891–1963), American Major League Baseball pitcher
- Rob Standridge, American pharmacy owner and politician (Republican) who has served in the Oklahoma Senate
