= William D. Atkinson =

American judge (1861–1945)

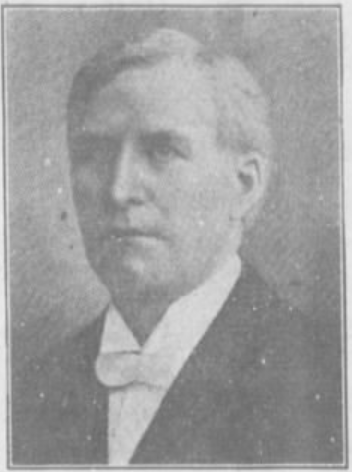
W. D. Atkinson (circa 1924)

William DeBoice Atkinson (March 26, 1861 – September 23, 1945) was a justice of the Kansas Supreme Court from January 1, 1904, to December 1, 1904.

== Life and education ==
He was born March 26, 1861, in Dubuque County, Iowa to John and Peolelia Atkinson who also had four other children. At the age of three he moved to Jones County, Iowa with his family where he worked on a farm and attended school in the winters.

From the age of eighteen he taught in his home district school for a year before going to study in Ames, Iowa at the agricultural college. He continued to teach in his local school in the winter vacations, and graduated in 1882 obtaining his B.S. degree.

In 1883, he moved to Kansas, where his parents had already moved to a farm in Neosho County, and again he took to teaching school, and he spent two years as the Thayer schools superintendent. Shortly after in the spring of 1884 he began to learn law at a law office in Parsons, Kansas belonging to Walter L. Simons a judge of the 6th district, and December 6, 1886, he was admitted to the bar.

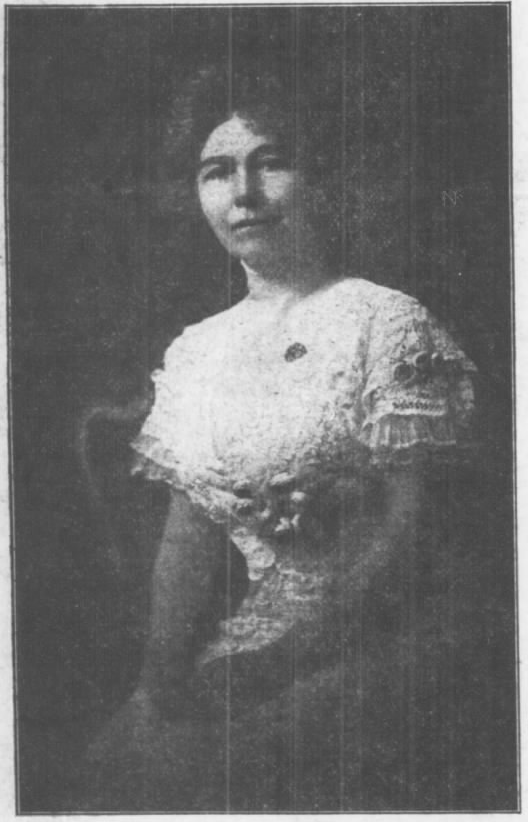
The first Mrs W. D. Atkinson - President of the Kansas Federation of Women's Clubs (circa 1913)

He married Miss Fannie Cooper a local high school principal on October 13, 1892, with whom he has a son that did not survive past infancy. She became the President of the Kansas Federation of Women's Clubs in 1911, her second run for the position. He survived his wife when she died in their home in Parsons November 10, 1916. She was the president of the Women's Kansas Day club when she died, and had been the secretary of the National Federation of Women's clubs. She had also practiced law, including before the supreme court.

He married his second wife Beatrice Deem Atkinson in April 1919, and he was her second husband after her first Albert R. Deem who had died several years earlier. She died November 18, 1922, at her home in Parsons after suffering with an illness for four years.

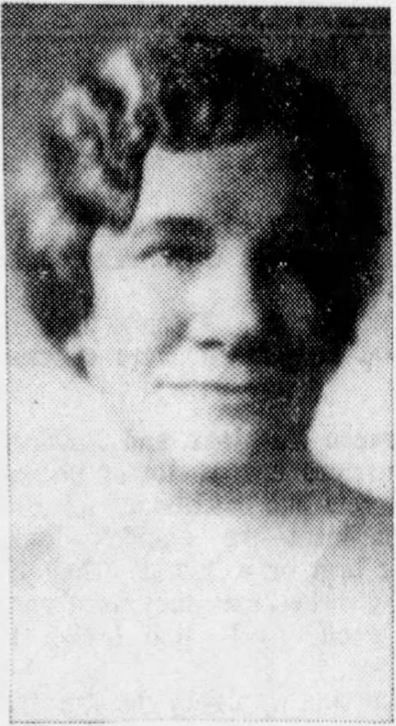
Mrs Florence DeLay Atkinson (third wife)

He married his third wife Florence DeLay from Chebanse, Illinois in 1926 in Kansas City. She was a teacher for fifteen years, an active member of the Presbyterian church, the Women's Kansas Day Club, Ruskin club and others. She was the president of the Parsons City Federation of Women's Clubs for four years, and president of the Third District Kansas Federation of Women's Clubs for two years, as well as other notable roles

Atkinson has also served on the Parsons school board and been generally active in the community include as a member of the Presbyterian church, and the chamber of commerce. He liked to support young students eager to learn and during his time he financially supported fifteen youngsters to obtain their college degrees. His support was not only for the young but also the sick and he not only gave his time for legal work for the hospital but donated the land that the Mercy hospital in Parsons was built on.

== Career ==
After being admitted to the bar in Labette County, Kansas he formed a partnership with Judge Simons in Parsons called Simons & Atkinson, until his partner left and Atkinson took over the practice. He was appointed by Mayor George W. Gabriel to serve as the City Attorney for fifteen years and also served the public in other roles.

Atkinson was appointed by governor Willis J. Bailey in January 1904 to fill the seat on the supreme court vacated when John Calvin Pollock who resigned to move to the United States District Court for the District of Kansas. The appointment was until the next general election for the post at the end of the year, and he was given the oath by Chief Justice William Agnew Johnston. When the position was up for election he stood for the republican nomination but lost to Clark Allen Smith who went on to win the seat. After his supreme court service he returned to private practice in his law firm in Parsons.

In 1924 he agreed to run for the position of Judge of the district court on the Republican nomination after much encouragement. He served two terms in the role and retired January 1, 1933 again returning to private practice but his health caused him to eventually retire.

== Death ==
Atkinson died September 23, 1945, in his home in Parsons, after suffering pneumonia earlier in the year, from which he never completely recovered. He was survived by his third wife Florence and their foster daughter Mrs Leon Decker. He had not had any more children of his own after the premature loss of his first son with his first wife.

Political offices
Preceded by John Calvin Pollock	Justice of the Kansas Supreme Court; 1904–1904	Succeeded by Clark Allen Smith
