= Justice Hutchinson =

Justice Hutchinson may refer to:

- Anderson Hutchinson (1798–1852), associate justice of the Republic of Texas Supreme Court
- Foster Hutchinson (1724–1799), associate justice of the Massachusetts Supreme Judicial Court
- Titus Hutchinson (1771–1857), associate justice and chief justice of the Vermont Supreme Court
- William Easton Hutchinson (1860–1952), associate justice of the Kansas Supreme Court

== See also ==
- John B. Hutcheson (1860–1939), associate justice of the Supreme Court of Georgia
- Judge Hutchinson (disambiguation)
