= David Martin (Kansas judge) =

American judge (1839–1901)

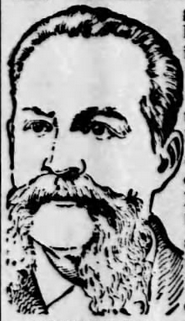
Charles Burleigh Graves

David Martin (October 16, 1839 – March 2, 1901) was a chief justice of the Kansas Supreme Court from April 30, 1895, to January 11, 1897.

== Life and education ==
Martin was born October 16, 1839, in Catawba, Ohio, and after his basic education worked as a miller from the age of 17 for 6 years. It was during the last two years working the mill that he also studied law. He was admitted to the bar in Ohio in 1866, and started to practice law in Mechanicsburg, Ohio. On June 2, 1867, he moved to Atchison County, Kansas and opened up a law office.

He was married to Melissa, the daughter of William B. Kipp, an early settler of the area, in 1882 and they had no children together.

In the American Civil War he served in Kentucky, Tennessee and Virginia as a member of the 129th Ohio Infantry, and was at the surrender of Cumberland Gap.

It was said that he had never drunk alcohol, didn't smoke, and never used a profane word.

== Career ==
Not long after starting general practice in Kansas he was elected a justice of the peace. He then served from 1873 to 1876 as the city attorney appointed to the position by Mayor Gillespie.

He was then nominated as the Republican candidate and elected to the position of judge of the second judicial district in 1880. So in January, 1881 Martin succeeded Judge Alfred G. Otis to serve as a member of the Atchison County bar. He was the re-elected unopposed four years later for another term, and served in this position until April 1887. He was noted as commanding a "universal respect" from both the bar and the people. He was considered a "plodder" in his role, as well as being kind, careful and conscientious. He was described as being short and fleshy, walking with a waddle and "not fluent of speech".

He did not complete his second term and two years before the end resigned to become a partner in the law firm of Waggener, Martin and Orr. He worked for the firm until January 1, 1895 but left due to differences with Waggener over the estate of Aaron S. Everest, stating at the time "Partners cannot dwell in hostile camps".

When Chief Justice Albert H. Horton resigned Martin was appointed as the new chief justice by Governor Edmund Needham Morrill. Although they had been at disagreement the endorsement of his former partner B. P. Waggener was key to his appointment. Albert H. Horton then took a position in Martin's old law firm making it Waggener, Horton & Orr. Martin was nominated as a Republican for a second term in 1896 after the end of his initial term. He failed re-election that was put down by some to his decision to uphold the 1893 mortgage law as valid, and by others due to decisions that antagonized the railroads. Fellow justice Stephen Haley Allen later wrote of Martin that "by his impartiality and firm adherence to the law, he incurred the displeasure of the great corporate interests of the state". Martin was tendered again in 1898 for nomination by the Populist leaders, but declined on the grounds of him still being a Republican.

After being Chief Justice he went on to lecture on Equity Jurisprudence at the University of Kansas School of Law. He also continued in private practice over the same period.

== Death ==
He died at his home in Atchison County, Kansas March 2, 1901 of pneumonia with heart disease complications. He had been in a critical condition for a couple of weeks but his death still shocked the family as they believed he was improving. Following his often expressed wish, his body was returned to his native town of Mechanicsburg, Ohio. He was buried with the remains of his father and mother. In honor of him the Supreme Court closed for a day to allow several other members to attend the funeral. He left his wife well provisioned for with property and life insurance.

Political offices
Preceded by Albert H. Horton	Chief Justice of the Kansas Supreme Court; 1895–1897	Succeeded by Frank Doster
