= Judge Allen =

Judge Allen may refer to:

- Ann Marie McIff Allen (born 1972), judge of the United States District Court for the District of Utah
- Arenda Wright Allen (born 1960), judge of the United States District Court for the Eastern District of Virginia
- Charles M. Allen (1916–2000), judge of the United States District Court for the Western District of Kentucky
- Cheryl Lynn Allen (born 1947), judge of the Pennsylvania Superior Court.
- Florence E. Allen (1884–1966), judge of the United States Court of Appeals for the Sixth Circuit
- Laurie Allen (judge) (fl. 1970s–2020s), judge of the Family Division of the Manitoba Court of Queen's Bench
- Macon Bolling Allen (1816–1894), judge of the Charleston County, South Carolina, Criminal Court
- Michael P. Allen (born 1967), judge of the United States Court of Appeals for Veterans Claims
- William J. Allen (1829–1901), judge of the United States District Court for the Southern District of Illinois

== See also ==
- Justice Allen (disambiguation)
