= Allen Banks Burch =

American judge (1894–1948)

Allen Banks Burch (1894 – May 31, 1948) was a justice of the Kansas Supreme Court from January 8, 1945, to May 31, 1948.

He was elected to the supreme court to fill the seat vacated by the retirement of justice John Shaw Dawson. He stood as a Republican for position 7 on the court, and when elected was the youngest member of the court. He was succeeded by Austin M. Cowan after his unexpected death. This was a temporary appointment pending an election of Robert T. Price who completed the unexpired term of Burch.

He wrote the minority opinion for the 1947 Reorganization Act that invalidated all sections of the 1945 Reorganization Act deemed to violate the state constitution.

He was a member of the American Bar Association and the Kansas Bar Association. He had also been the vice president and counsel to The Morris Plan bank of Kansas.

He was born in Carthage, Missouri in 1894 to a medical doctor, growing up in Fredonia, Kansas. As a child he visited Europe with his father, and saw art and culture that inspired him to later take up oil painting. He graduated from the University of Kansas in 1917, took the bar exam in June 1917 and joined an old law firm in Wichita. His career was interrupted by World War I in which he served. He returned from the war to practice law in Wichita until he was elected to the supreme court.

He was currently living in Wichita, Kansas when he died in Topeka, Kansas from a heart attack May 31, 1948. He had the fatal attack whilst playing bridge with his wife and friends. He left behind his wife May, a son Howard M. Burch and two daughters Joan Burch and Betty Dreher.

Political offices
Preceded by John Shaw Dawson	Justice of the Kansas Supreme Court; 1945–1948	Succeeded by Austin M. Cowan
