= Senator Horton =

Senator Horton may refer to:

- Albert H. Horton (1837–1902), Kansas State Senate
- Clinton T. Horton (1876–1953), New York State Senate
- Frank O. Horton (1882–1948), Wyoming State Senate
- Hamilton C. Horton Jr. (1931–2006), North Carolina State Senate
- Henry Hollis Horton (1866–1934), Tennessee State Senate
- S. Wentworth Horton (1885–1960), New York State Senate
- Wilkins P. Horton (1889–1950), North Carolina State Senate
