= Justice Allen =

Justice Allen may refer to:

- Charles Allen (jurist) (1827–1913), associate justice of the Massachusetts Supreme Judicial Court
- Elisha H. Allen (1804–1883), chief justice of the Hawaiian Islands
- Florence E. Allen (1884–1966), associate justice of the Ohio Supreme Court
- Frederic W. Allen (1926–2016), chief justice of the Vermont Supreme Court
- George W. Allen (judge) (1844–1928), associate justice and chief justice of the Colorado Supreme Court
- Harry K. Allen (1872–1959), associate justice of the Kansas Supreme Court
- John Allen (Rhode Island judge) (1748–1813), associate justice of the Rhode Island Supreme Court
- John Campbell Allen (1817–1898), associate justice and chief justice of the colonial New Brunswick Supreme Court
- John E. Allen (judge) (1873–1945), associate justice of the New Hampshire Supreme Court
- John J. Allen (judge) (1797–1871), associate justice of the Virginia Supreme Court of Appeals
- Stephen Haley Allen (1847–1931), associate justice of the Kansas Supreme Court
- William Allen (Massachusetts judge) (1822–1891), judge of the Massachusetts Supreme Judicial Court
- William Allen (loyalist) (1704–1780), chief justice of the Supreme Court of Pennsylvania
- William F. Allen (New York politician) (1808–1878), associate justice of the New York Court of Appeals
- William H. H. Allen (1829–1893), associate justice of the New Hampshire Supreme Court
- William Reynolds Allen (1860–1921), associate justice of the North Carolina Supreme Court
