= Edward Sloan =

Edward Sloan may refer to:

- Edward L. Sloan (1830–1874), Latter-day Saint editor and publisher
- Edward Ray Sloan (1883–1964), Justice of the Kansas Supreme Court
- Edward Van Sloan (1882–1964), American film character actor
