= Clark Allen Smith =

American judge (1846–1921)

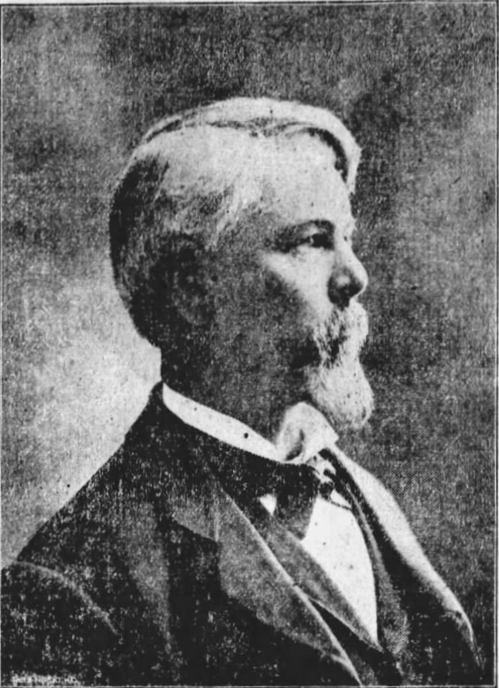
Judge Clark A. Smith (c. 1904)

Clark Allen Smith (July 29, 1846 – March 6, 1921) was a justice of the Kansas Supreme Court from December 1, 1904, to January 11, 1915.

== Life and education ==
Smith was born July 29, 1846, in Rock County, Wisconsin, where he grew up on a farm.

After his initial education he taught school in between his further studies. Attending the University of Wisconsin he graduated in 1870 in the classics and then in 1871 in law for his degree in "the arts and law courses". Directly after obtaining his degree he moved to Cawker City in Kansas, where he was one of the first settlers of Mitchell County and arrived in 1871 where he became the first public school teacher. He obtained another degree from Washburn college in Topeka, Kansas, where he was a member of the Phi Delta Theta fraternity.

In 1873 he married Miss Sarah Bowers with whom he had two sons, Matthew A. Smith and Omar D. Smith who also became a lawyer.

He was a mason and a charter member of the lodge in Cawker, and was the organiser of the Cawker City Hesperian Library club. The club owned its own building and the Old Cawker City Library was added to the National Register of Historic Places in 1972.

In 1890 he was involved in advocating for the railroad to join northern Kansas to the markets of Omaha and Lincoln in Nebraska and then on to Chicago, and he was one of the incorporators of the Omaha, Superior & Southern railway company.

== Legal career ==
After teaching he then went on to start practising law and created a law partnership with F. J. Knight. His interests were not just in law but also politics and was elected to serve as county attorney in 1873, serving one term.

In 1880 he was elected to be judge of the 15th district, the result was contested and the state supreme court decided that the incumbents terms had not yet expired. He tried again in 1881 winning again as an independent candidate, and he was then a judge for the 15th judicial district from 1881 to 1889, but lost the position as he was beaten by the Populists by 100 votes in 1890.

He was a republican and stood against Judge William D. Atkinson for the republican nomination for the supreme court. Atkinson had been serving on the court after being appointed to fill the seat left free when John Calvin Pollock moved to the United States District Court for the District of Kansas. He then won the election in November 1904 and took up the position on the court to complete the remaining unexpired term of Justice Pollock. In 1908 he stood again with his being one of three positions expiring, and he was successfully re-elected for another term.

He taught at Washburn law school along with two other supreme court members Alfred Washburn Benson and Henry Freeman Mason, with Smith lecturing in 1912 on Extra Ordinary Legal Remedies.

He retired from the supreme court when he stood in 1914, along with two other Smiths, to keep the position but lost with John Shaw Dawson and John Marshall winning the seats.

He continued to practice law including being involved in cases presented to the supreme court such as Good v. Higgins, 99 Kan. 315 (1916) and State v. William, 106 Kan. 778 (1920).

== Death ==
He died March 6, 1921, at his home in Cawker City after several months of ill health, and was survived by his wife and two sons. He was buried at the Cawker City cemetery. The Mitchell County Bar Association honored him for his work and his character.

Political offices
Preceded by William D. Atkinson	Justice of the Kansas Supreme Court; 1904–1915	Succeeded by John Shaw Dawson; John Marshall
