= Justice Ellis =

Justice Ellis may refer to:

- Abram Halstead Ellis (1847–1902), associate justice of the Kansas Supreme Court
- Overton G. Ellis (1860–1940), associate justice of the Washington Supreme Court
- Powhatan Ellis (1790–1863), associate justice of the Mississippi Supreme Court
- Richard Ellis (Texas politician) (1781–1846), associate justice of the Alabama Supreme Court
- W. H. Ellis (1867–1948), associate justice of the Florida Supreme Court

== See also ==
- Judge Ellis
