= John Marshall (Kansas judge) =

American lawyer and judge (1858–1931)

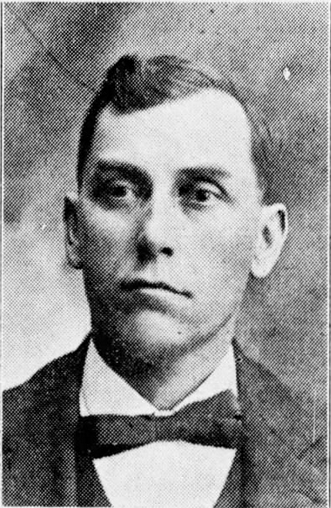
- Marshall, c. 1916

Justice of the Kansas Supreme Court
- In office November 1, 1915 – March 25, 1931

Personal details
- Born: April 11, 1858 Logansport, Indiana, US
- Died: March 25, 1931 (aged 72) Topeka, Kansas, US
- Party: Republican
- Spouse: Miss Addie Jenks (m. 1882)
- Children: 3
- Education: Kansas State University
- Occupation: Lawyer, judge

John Marshall (April 11, 1858 – March 25, 1931) was an American lawyer and judge. He served as a justice of the Kansas Supreme Court from January 11, 1915, to March 25, 1931.

== Life and education ==
Marshall was born April 11, 1858, in Logansport, Indiana, the son of Humphrey Marshall and Margaret Marshall (née Rice). The family then moved to Kansas in 1870, the state John would spend the rest of his life in. He started his education in the Independence school district, while living in Grenola the place where his mother died while he was young and her grave is located.

Following the death of his mother, Marshall's father returned to Indiana, but John stayed and lived with neighbors. He acquired much of his education being self-taught, before going on to spend two years at Kansas State University where he graduated with high honors even though he suffered a severe measles attack during his education. He qualified as a teacher holding a first grade teacher's certificate.

After university, Marshall returned to Elk county and married Addie Jenks of Mound Branch in 1882. He served as a member of the school board of Howard, Kansas, for several years. He was profoundly religious and it was said that he feared God and no one else. Starting December 1915, he gave a series of addresses to the Second Presbyterian Church, in North Topeka, starting with "Am I a Jonah?"

== Career ==
In 1882, Marshall was admitted to the bar in Elk County, with his first official position as mayor of Howard the city where he lived. He was then the Howard city attorney for several years, and then the Elk County Attorney from 1895 until 1899. He later went on to become the Winfield city attorney and later an attorney for the Kansas State Temperance Union. He also worked as the state assistant attorney general under Fred S. Jackson, and as attorney for the railroad commission and public utilities commission from 1911 to 1913. He was a Republican.

Marshall was known for being an outstanding figure in the enforcement of the Kansas prohibition laws. He had been an attorney for the Anti-Saloon League and was the creator of the "padlock plan" for controlling blind pigs. He also represented the Temperance Society of the Methodist Church in Colorado, and was part of the development of prohibition in Kansas.

In January 1914, Marshall announced that he would run for the Kansas Supreme Court with a desire to move from being John Marshall of Elk county to John Marshall of Kansas, he was living in Topeka at the time. Although popular with many in September 1914 Myra McHenry made it "Her Hobby Now" to go after Marshall's "political scalp" not believing he was fit for the position. McHenry had known him for thirty years and circulated pamphlets criticizing him. She claimed that while he was the prosecuting attorney for Cowley County, Kansas, prisoners lounged in a carpeted lobby in the jail. She also claimed she was held under guard at her home charged with insanity, then escaped and on securing legal help the charges were dropped.

Marshall was elected to the court along with John Shaw Dawson to replace Alfred Washburn Benson and Clark Allen Smith, with Henry Freeman Mason retaining his seat. He also lectured at the Washburn Law School from around 1915 teaching Real Property.

== Death ==
Marshall died on March 25, 1931, aged 72, in Topeka, Kansas, from a prolonged illness. He had had a severe cold that has prevented him from his service to the court for several weeks, returning for the January inaugural ceremonies. Later that month he was again confined to his home with heart issues. On the night of his death after sitting in a chair for an hour he complained of feeling tired and returned to bed, dying not long after.

Following Marshall's death, Edward Ray Sloan was appointed to complete his unexpired term by Governor Harry Hines Woodring.

Political offices
Preceded by Clark Allen Smith; Alfred Washburn Benson	Justice of the Kansas Supreme Court; 1915-1931	Succeeded by Edward Ray Sloan
