= Richard Winn Holmes =

American judge (1923–1999)

Richard Winn Holmes (February 23, 1923 – September 4, 1999) was a justice of the Kansas Supreme Court from September 17, 1977, to September 1, 1990, and chief justice from September 1, 1990, to August 31, 1995.

Holmes was appointed to replace Robert H. Kaul, joining the court at the same time as Kay McFarland.

Prior to the supreme court appointment Holmes had worked for the law firm Holmes, Mellor, Schaefer and Compton in Wichita, Kansas, and was also the chairman of the Wichita Bar Association's Ethics and Grievance Committee. In 1992 he was awarded the "Award of Merit" from the American Judges Association, an award that was renamed in 2000 to be the "Chief Justice Richard W. Holmes Award of Merit". In 1959 he founded the North American Judges Association, and was the chairman of the Kansas Judicial Council for two years.

Holmes retired from the supreme court on August 31, 1995, at the age of 72 when Kay McFarland took his place as Chief Justice of the Kansas Supreme Court. He retired 16 months earlier than the designated term end after participating in over 3600 decisions. The vacant position was then taken by Edward Larson.

Holmes originated in Wichita, Kansas and during World War II served in the Navy. He obtained a degree in business administration in 1950 from the Kansas State University, then obtained his law degree from the Washburn University School of Law in 1953. He started his career practicing law with his father, with a speciality in corporation and probate law.

He died September 4, 1999, at his home in Topeka, Kansas at the age of 76.

Legal offices
Preceded by Robert H. Miller	Chief Justice of the Kansas Supreme Court; 1990–1995	Succeeded by Kay McFarland
Preceded by Robert H. Kaul	Justice of the Kansas Supreme Court; 1977–1995	Succeeded by Edward Larson
