= Frederick N. Six =

American judge (1929–2024)

Frederick N. Six (April 20, 1929 – April 27, 2024) was an American judge. He served as a justice of the Kansas Supreme Court from September 1, 1988, to January 13, 2003.

== Early life and education ==
Six was born on April 20, 1929 in Independence, Missouri. His parents were Gladys Newton and Deal Demmi Six. He was raised in the Reorganized Church of Latter-Day Saints. He graduated from Libertry Memorial High School in Lawrence, Kansas.

He graduated in history at the University of Kansas in 1951. While there, he was a member of Phi Delta Theta and was president of the Forensic League. He served in the United States Marine Corps, from 1951 to 1953, receiving the Korean Service Medal with two stars and the United Nations Service Medal Korea for his time in the Korean War.

He graduated first in his class from the University of Kansas School of Law in 1956, Order of the Coif. While there, he was editor-in-chief of the Kansas Law Review. In 1990, Six received an LLM in judicial process from the University of Virginia.

== Career ==
Six began his law career in New York City with Reid & Priest. He was then an assistant attorney general in Kansas. From 1961 to 1987, he was in private practice with Asher, Ellsworth & Six, and then Barber, Emerson, Six, Springer & Zinn. He chaired the Douglas County Republican Party.

He was appointed to the Kansas Court of Appeals to succeed Judge Sherman A. Parks in August 1987 by Kansas Governor Mike Hayden. serving from 19889 to 2003. He also taught at the University of Kansas School of Law and Washburn Law School.

Six was appointed to the Kansas Supreme Court by Kansas Governor Mike Hayden to replace David Prager, who retired. He served on the Supreme Court from September 1988 to January 2003. He retired in 2003.

Six was a fellow of the American Bar Foundation and Kansas Bar Foundation. He was president of the Kansas Law Society and a board member of the Kansas Bar Association. Six was chair of the Kansas Client Security Fund and volunteered with the Douglas County Legal Aid Society. He received the Kansas Bar Association's Outstanding Service Award and the Philip Lewis Medal of Distinction from the University of Kansas School of Law.

== Personal life ==
Six was married to Lillian Olddon in Stockholm, Sweden on May 11, 1961. They had two children: Catherine Six and Stephen Six.

Six was chair of the Kansas Water Resources Board and was board member of the Haskell Indian University Foundation, the Lawrence Symphony, and the Salvantion Army.

Six died on at his home in Lawrence, Kansas on April 27, 2024, at the age of 95.

Political offices
Preceded by David Prager	Justice of the Kansas Supreme Court; 1988–2003	Succeeded by Marla Luckert
