= Judge Hutchinson =

Judge Hutchinson may refer to:

- John B. Hutcheson (1860–1939), associate justice of the Supreme Court of Georgia
- Matthew Hutchinson (1843–1926), judge of the Quebec Superior Court

== See also ==
- William D. Hutchinson (1932–1995), judge of the United States Court of Appeals for the Third Circuit
- Judge Hutcheson (disambiguation)
- Justice Hutchinson (disambiguation)
