= Robert H. Miller (judge) =

American judge (1919–2009)

Kansas Supreme Court Justice

Personal details
- Born: March 3, 1919 Columbus, Ohio
- Died: September 10, 2009 (aged 90) Topeka, Kansas

Robert Haskins Miller (March 3, 1919 – September 10, 2009) was the Chief Justice of the Kansas Supreme Court from 1988 to 1990.

Born in Columbus, Ohio, Miller received his bachelor's degree from the University of Kansas and received his law degree from University of Kansas School of Law. After serving in the military during World War II, Miller served as Kansas county attorney and later was a Kansas district court judge and United States magistrate judge. In 1975, he was appointed to the Kansas Supreme Court, where he became chief justice. He died in Topeka, Kansas.

Legal offices
| Preceded by David Prager | Chief Justice of the Kansas Supreme Court; 1988–1990 | Succeeded by Richard Winn Holmes |
| Preceded by John F. Fontron | Justice of the Kansas Supreme Court; 1975–1988 | Succeeded by Bob Abbott |
