= Lloyd M. Kagey =

American judge (1902–1977)

Lloyd Monroe Kagey (April 18, 1902 – October 1977) was a justice of the Kansas Supreme Court from December 4, 1950 to January 8, 1951.

== Life and education ==
He was born April 18, 1902 in Beloit, Kansas to Charles L. Kagey a former United States minister to Finland and his wife.

He attended public school in Beloit, before spending three years at the University of Kansas, then going on to Washburn University School of Law to obtain his law degree in 1927. He passed the bar examination in July 1927.

In 1940 Kagey had contracted polio and had been paralysed from the waist downwards requiring his to use a wheelchair.

== Career ==
He began his career practising law in his home town of Beloit.

Kagey was the Sedgwick County Assistant Attorney from 1941 until 1947.

When Edward F. Arn resigned William J. Wertz was appointed to the court and Wertz filed for the next full term starting January 8, 1951. However he failed to file for the remainder of the current term from the election until the start of the new term, Kagey did file and won the seat. Wertz won the election for the new term so Kagey served just 35 days on the court. This was an unusual oversight for Wertz as in 1948, he had been appointed as a District Judge in Sedgwick County but failed to file for the interim period from the election till the start of the new term, again Kagey did file and won. In his short service he authored five of the courts opinions.

In 1956, he ran as the Republican candidate for the 66th district.

== Death and legacy ==
He died October, 1977 at the age of 75. In 1979 his friends and associates set up the Justice Lloyd Kagey Leadership Award that would be presented annually to a graduating student who has shown effective leadership to the University of Kansas students.

Political offices
Preceded by William J. Wertz	Justice of the Kansas Supreme Court; 1950–1951	Succeeded by William J. Wertz
