= Judge Hutcheson =

Judge Hutcheson may refer to:

- Charles Sterling Hutcheson (1894–1969), judge of the United States District Court for the Eastern District of Virginia
- Joseph Chappell Hutcheson Jr. (1879–1973), judge of the United States Court of Appeals for the Fifth Circuit

== See also ==
- Judge Hutchinson (disambiguation)
