= Lawrence Dudley Bailey =

American judge (1819–1891)

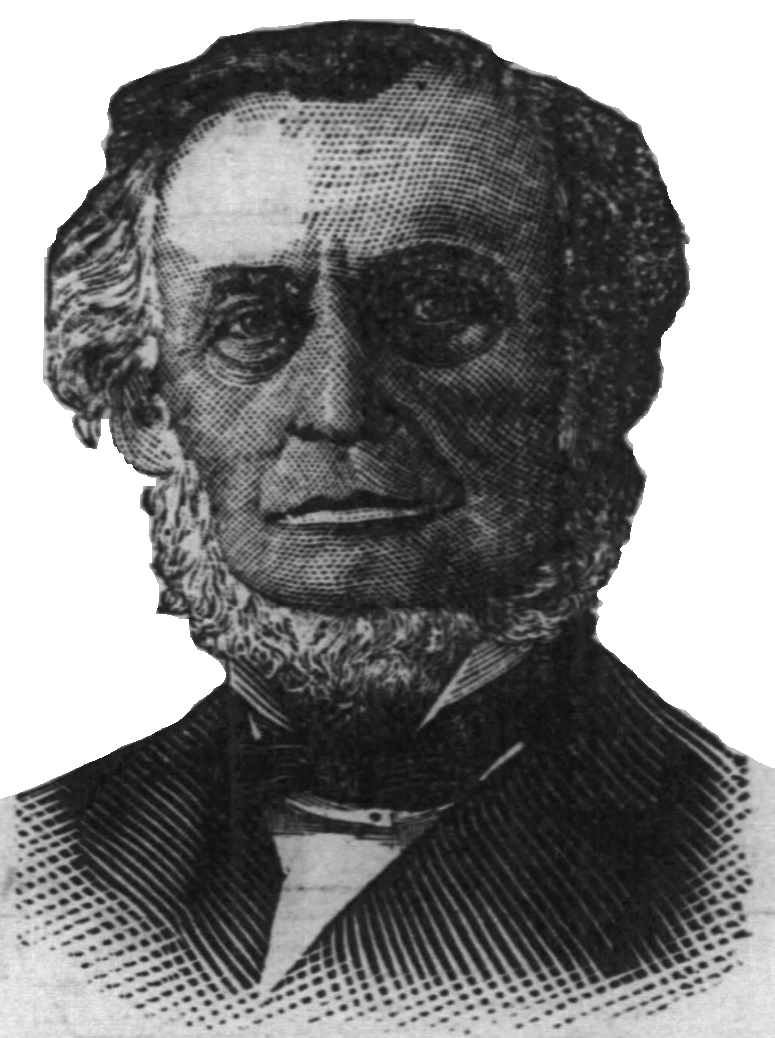
Lawrence Dudley Bailey

Lawrence Dudley Bailey (August 26, 1819 – October 15, 1891) was an American abolitionist who served as justice of the Kansas Supreme Court from February 9, 1861 to January 11, 1869.

== Early life, education, and career ==
Born in Sutton, Merrimack County, New Hampshire to Dudley and Sarah (Woodman) Bailey, Bailey worked on his father's farm until the age of seventeen, and attended Franklin, Unity, Pembroke, and Atkinson academies, but never attended college. He became an abolitionist in 1837, writing frequently in various abolitionist newspapers. He read law with Mason W. Tappan to gain admission to the bar on July 9, 1846. He began practicing in East Washington, New Hampshire in 1847, moving in March of that year to Milford, New Hampshire, and partnering there with S.K Livermore until 1949. He moved to California as part of the 1849 California Gold Rush, returning to New Hampshire in 1853 and forming a partnership with Mason W. Tappan at Bradford, New Hampshire.

== Move to Kansas ==
Bailey moved to Kansas on April 2, 1857, though he would have preferred to move to Minnesota, but felt that Kansas was in jeopardy of becoming a slave state. He was "conspicuous in his efforts to rescue [Kansas] from the blight of slavery", at one point having to swim the Kansas River at night while in Lawrence, Kansas, during an attack by "border ruffians". In Kansas, he opened a law office near Emporia, and wrote for the Emporia News, published by Preston B. Plumb, whom Bailey also supervised as Plumb read law. Bailey was elected to the legislature in November 1858.

== Judicial service and later life ==
Under the new free-soil Constitution he was elected as a Judge of the Supreme Court in 1861, and reelected in 1862 for a six year term. He was interested in the material development of Kansas, and was prominent in the organization of the first Board of Agriculture. During this time, he was also active in persuading the state legislature to establish the State Normal School at Emporia.

In 1869 he was again elected to the legislature, and in 1870 founded the town of Lyndon, Kansas, which became the county seat of Osage County later that year. For a time was editor and publisher of the Cultivator and Herdsman, and was long a contributor to the newspaper press.

== Personal life and death ==
In his later life, Bailey occupied a farm. On December 15, 1870, he married the widowed Elizabeth A. Peabody of Lawrence, Kansas, who survived him.

Political offices
Preceded by Newly created seat	Justice of the Kansas Supreme Court; 1861–1869	Succeeded by Daniel Mulford Valentine
