= Robert H. Kaul =

American judge (1911–2000)

Robert H. Kaul (August 28, 1911 – March 13, 2000) was a justice of the Kansas Supreme Court from September 27, 1965, to September 17, 1977.

Kaul was appointed to the supreme court to take the place of Clair E. Robb who had died in the post. Prior to the appointment the Wamego judge had been a district judge. He resigned from the court, and his position taken by Richard Winn Holmes.

He was a Kansas state judge for 28 years, starting with 16 years as a judge for the 36th district and them 12 years on the supreme court.

He was born in August 1911 near Holton, Kansas on a farm to German immigrants. He obtained his first degree from Washburn University, then his law degree from the University of Kansas in 1935. He started practising law in Wamego and served as the Pottawatomie County attorney for 3 terms. He served in the Navy in World War II as an 11th Naval District trial judge advocate.

Kaul died aged 88 on Monday March 13, 2000 at his home in Topeka, Kansas. He had a wife named Margaret.

Political offices
Preceded by Clair E. Robb	Justice of the Kansas Supreme Court; 1965–1977	Succeeded by Richard Winn Holmes
