= Louis Franklin Valentine =

American newspaper publisher and politician (1877–1962)

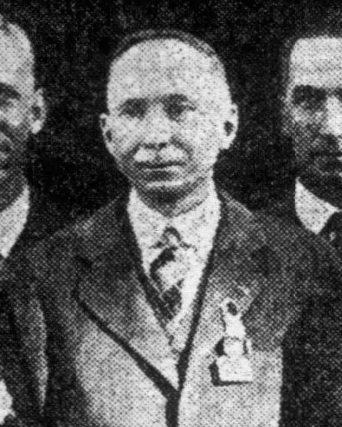

Kansas House of Representatives
- In office 1939–1942

Personal details
- Born: December 15, 1877 Topeka, Kansas, US
- Died: June 20, 1962 (aged 84) Clay Center, Kansas, US
- Party: Republican
- Parent: Daniel Mulford Valentine (father)

Louis Franklin Valentine (December 15, 1877 – June 20, 1962) was an American newspaper publisher and Republican member of the Kansas House of Representatives from 1939 till 1942.

== Biography ==
Valentine was born December 15, 1877 in Topeka, Kansas to Daniel Mulford Valentine who was also a member of the Kansas House of Representatives as well as the Kansas State Senate and justice of the Kansas Supreme Court. He started his education in local schools before going on to obtain a degree in microscopic biology in 1900 from Washburn University.

He moved to Clay Center, Kansas in 1900 and worked as the manager of his brothers newspaper, D. A. Valentine, the weekly Clay Center Times. He later owned his own newspaper the daily Clay Center Dispatch from around 1941, but left his son Harry E. Valentine to be the editor after the end of World War II.

He married Olive Gertrude Landis, who went on to own the Clay Center Publishing Company.

Valentine was elected to the Kansas House of Representatives for two consecutive terms, serving from 1939 until 1942.

He was on the Peoples National Bank board of directors for 34 years. As a member of the Masons he was honored with 50-year buttons from both the Royal Arch chapter and the Coronado Commanders Knights Templar. He was a member, vice-president and then president of the Kansas Press Association.

He died June 20, 1962 in Clay Center, and is buried in Greenwood Cemetery in the same city. He was survived by his wife, a son and a daughter. His wife died just a few weeks later in Clay County Hospital aged 82, and was buried in the same cemetery. He was entered into the Kansas Newspaper Hall of Fame in a ceremony at the University of Kansas in 1969.
