= Jacy J. Hurst =

American judge

Judge of the Kansas Court of Appeals
- Incumbent
- Assumed office August 13, 2021
- Appointed by: Laura Kelly
- Preceded by: Melissa Standridge

Personal details
- Born: Lawrence, Kansas, U.S.
- Education: University of Kansas (BS, JD)

Jacy J. Hurst is an American lawyer who has served as a judge of the Kansas Court of Appeals since August 2021.

== Education ==
Hurst earned her Bachelor of Science in Business Administration with honors from the University of Kansas in 2002 and her Juris Doctor from the University of Kansas School of Law in 2006. In law school, Hurst was the Black Law Student Association treasurer, Student Bar Association third-year class vice president and the Kansas University Law Review staff member, 2005–06.

== Career ==
She began her legal career in 2007 as a commercial litigator with the Kansas City law firm of Stinson LLP. In 2014, she became general counsel and chief compliance officer at Swope Health Services. From 2017 to 2021 she was of counsel and later partner at the Kansas City office of Kutak Rock, where she specialized in health care regulatory law. Hurst provided pro bono legal services to individuals in criminal and family law cases. In 2020, she became an adjunct professor at Washburn University School of Law.

Hurst became a board member of the Douglas County United Way in 2018 and was chairman of the Board 2020 - 2021. Hurst became a member of the Kansas Board of Law Examiners in 2020.

== Kansas Court of Appeals ==
On February 11, 2021, Kansas Governor Laura Kelly appointed Hurst to be a judge of the Kansas Court of Appeals to fill the vacancy left by Judge Melissa Standridge who was elevated to the Kansas Supreme Court. She was confirmed on March 23, 2021, by the Kansas Senate, becoming the first woman of color to serve on the Court of Appeals. She was sworn in on August 13, 2021.

Legal offices
Preceded by Melissa Standridge	Judge of the Kansas Court of Appeals; 2021–present	Incumbent
