= Larkin Walsh =

American lawyer and judge

Justice of the Kansas Supreme Court
- Incumbent
- Assumed office September 17, 2025
- Appointed by: Laura Kelly
- Preceded by: Evelyn Wilson

Personal details
- Born: 1978 or 1979 (age 46–47)
- Party: Democratic (before 2012); Republican (2012, 2016–2018, 2020–present); Independent (2012–2016, 2018–2020)
- Children: 4
- Education: Southern Methodist University (BA); University of Kansas (JD)

Larkin Walsh (born 1978 or 1979) is an American lawyer and judge serving as a justice of the Kansas Supreme Court. Appointed by Governor Laura Kelly in August 2025, she was sworn in later that year as the court's youngest sitting justice. Before joining the bench, Walsh was a partner at Sharp Law and senior counsel at Stueve Siegel Hanson, specializing in civil rights, consumer protection, and class action litigation. Her earlier legal career included two terms on the Kansas Board of Law Examiners, as well as service as a research attorney for the Kansas Supreme Court and a law clerk for the U.S. District Court for the District of Kansas.

== Early life and education ==
Walsh was born in 1978 or 1979 and is originally from the Kansas City metropolitan area. She attended Southern Methodist University, graduating in 2001 with B.A. degrees in English and studio art. She went on to earn her J.D. from the University of Kansas School of Law in 2004.

== Career ==
From 2005 to 2008, she worked as a research attorney for Kansas Supreme Court justice Carol A. Beier. She then served as a law clerk for judge Carlos Murguia at the U.S. District Court for the District of Kansas from 2008 to 2012. Walsh returned to the Kansas Supreme Court to serve a second stint as a research attorney for justice Beier from 2012 to 2013.

In 2013, Walsh joined the law firm Stueve Siegel Hanson as of counsel, where she worked until 2016. During this period, she was appointed to the Kansas Board of Law Examiners in 2014, eventually serving two five-year terms. She briefly practiced as an attorney at Chinnery Evans and Nail from 2016 to 2017. In 2017, she was selected to serve on the Bench-Bar Committee for the U.S. District Court for the District of Kansas.

Walsh joined Sharp Law in 2017 as an attorney, later becoming a partner at the firm and serving there until 2024. She returned to Stueve Siegel Hanson in 2024 as senior counsel, where her practice focused on civil rights, consumer protection, and labor law. Her biography at the firm highlighted her work advocating for survivors of forced labor, human trafficking, and sexual abuse. Throughout her career, Walsh worked on class action cases defending victims of sexual abuse, including litigation against Ohio State University that reached the U.S. Supreme Court. She withdrew from that case in January 2024. She also represented women in a medical privacy lawsuit against Lawrence Memorial Hospital and the University of Kansas Hospital Authority before withdrawing as counsel in August 2025.

Walsh has been involved with the Kansas Bar Association's Annual Survey of Law for 20 years, serving first as co-chair and later as editor.

=== Kansas Supreme Court ===
On June 14, 2025, the Kansas Supreme Court Nominating Commission selected Walsh as one of three finalists to fill a vacancy on the state's high court. She was 46 years old at the time of her selection and was the only nominee who did not already hold a seat on a local court bench. Governor Laura Kelly appointed her to the Kansas Supreme Court on August 7, 2025. Walsh succeeded justice Evelyn Wilson, who had resigned following a diagnosis of Amyotrophic Lateral Sclerosis (ALS).

Upon her appointment, Walsh pledged to interpret the law "irrespective of popular opinion or the political winds." Her selection drew criticism from Kansas Senate president Ty Masterson, who remarked that he hoped Walsh would "discover a judicial philosophy," noting that she had indicated during the selection process that she did not have one.

Voter registration records indicate that Walsh has held varying political affiliations over the years. She was registered as a Democrat in 2008 before switching to the Republican party in 2012. After periods of being registered as Unaffiliated and Republican between 2012 and 2018, she registered as a Republican in the fall of 2020 and maintained that affiliation through her appointment in 2025.

Walsh was informally sworn in on September 17, 2025, allowing her to commence her official duties. Her formal swearing-in ceremony took place on November 21, 2025, where she was administered the oath of office by acting chief justice Eric S. Rosen. At the time of her swearing-in, Walsh was the youngest justice on the court. Her initial term runs from September 2025 to January 2027, and she will face a retention vote after her first year in office.

As a justice, Walsh is assigned to the 4th Judicial Department, which encompasses the 6th, 10th, 11th, 14th, and 31st judicial districts. She also serves as the departmental liaison to several committees, including the Attorney Registration and the Kansas Continuing Legal Education Board.

== Personal life ==
Walsh resides in Leawood, Kansas. As of 2025, she has been married to her husband, Matt, for 20 years, and they have four children.

Legal offices
Preceded by Evelyn Wilson	Justice of the Kansas Supreme Court; 2025–present	Incumbent
