= Theodore A. Hurd =

American judge (1819–1899)

Theodore A. Hurd (December 21, 1819 – February 22, 1899) was a justice of the Kansas Supreme Court from April 23, 1884, to December 1, 1884.

== Life and education ==
He was born December 21, 1819, in Pawling, New York.

He graduated from the law department of the University of Utica, New York in 1847, and was admitted to the bar that same year.

He married and had children.

== Career ==
Soon after obtaining the bar he started private practice with B. Davis Noxon, and then later becoming a law partner with Joshua A. Spencer in New York.

In 1859, he moved to Leavenworth, Kansas and continued practising law. He was recognised as a very able lawyer and was in high demand from large corporations and wealthy clients. He specialised in corporation and constitutional law, and was the attorney for the Missouri Pacific Railroad. He was also the attorney for the Missouri Valley Life Insurance company from its inception until its end.

In 1868, he ran for District Judge but was unsuccessful and Judge Ide won.

In 1875, he was the senior partner in the law firm of Hurd and Monroe, with Mr Chas Monroe the other partner.

In April 1884, he was appointed by Governor George Washington Glick to fill the position on the supreme court left by the resignation of justice David Josiah Brewer. He only served the court a few months until the election of William Agnew Johnston.

He had stood as a Democratic candidate for various positions, but was only ever elected to one school board position.

== Death ==
He died, February 22, 1899, after a slight illness, he had been sitting near the breakfast table before suddenly falling from his chair dead. He died from heart failure. Several judges gave eulogies, and the Bar Association and Templar societies attended his funeral.

Political offices
Preceded by David Josiah Brewer	Justice of the Kansas Supreme Court; 1884–1884	Succeeded by William Agnew Johnston
