= William Easton Hutchinson =

American judge (1860–1952)

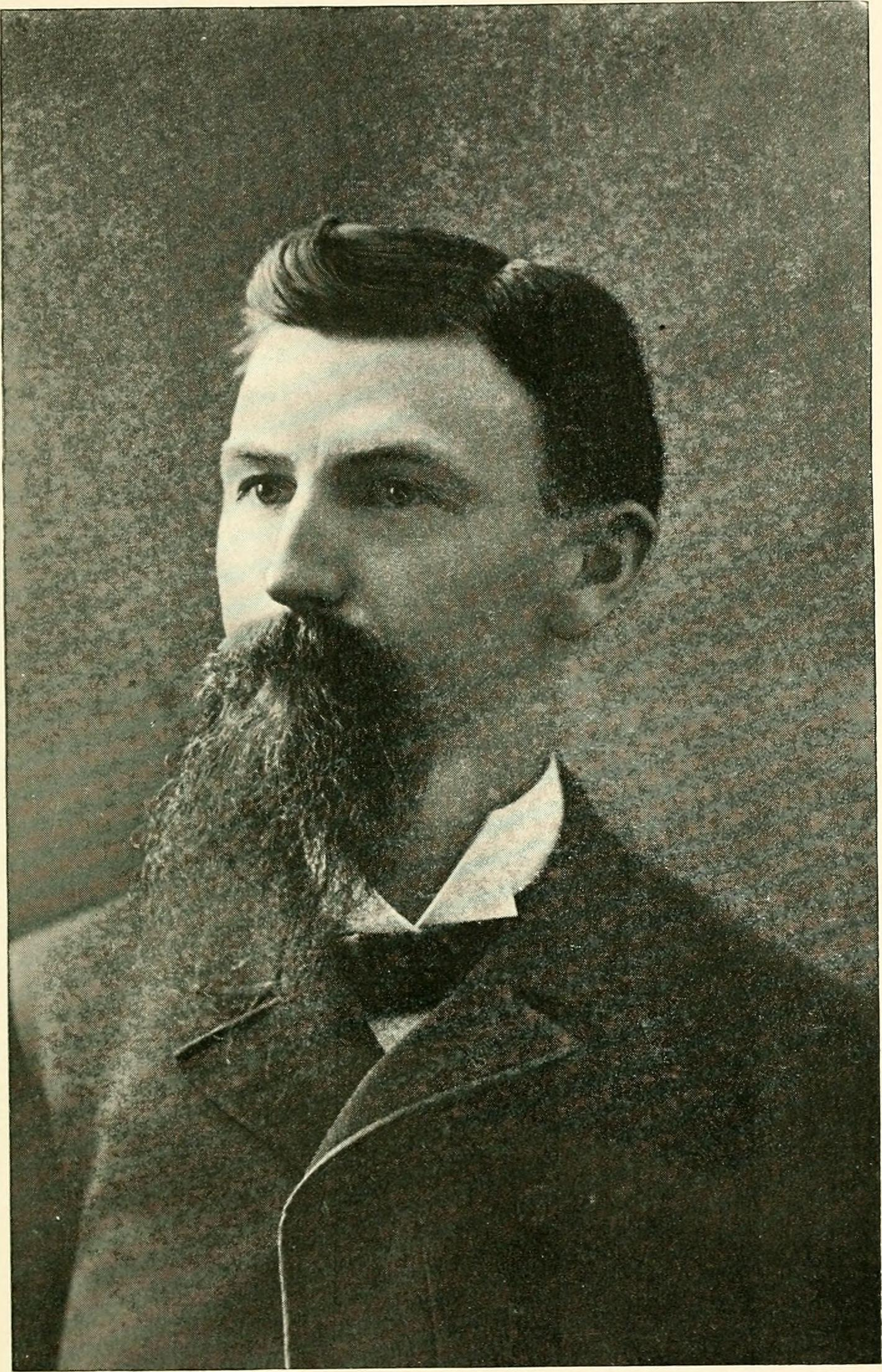
Hutchinson circa 1900

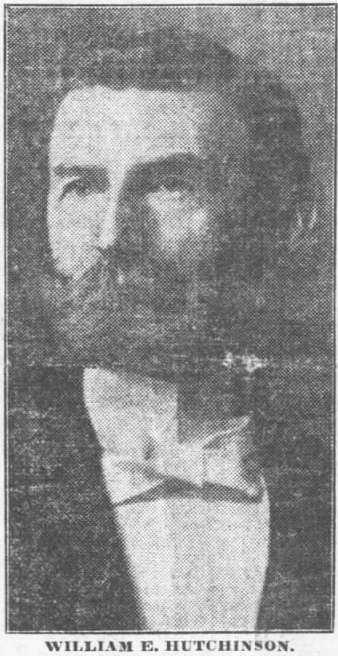
William Easton Hutchinson (circa 1912)

William Easton Hutchison (July 14, 1860 – April 5, 1952) was a justice of the Kansas Supreme Court from May 12, 1927, to January 9, 1939.

== Life and education ==
He was born July 14, 1860, in Oxford, Pennsylvania, to William G. Hutchison and Ann Eliza Hutchinson (née Campbell). He was educated in the public schools of Chester County, Pennsylvania, before starting at Lafayette College in 1883 and graduated 1887. He then studied law and moved to Kansas to start his career in the practice of law.

He married Miss Reba Anderson August 6, 1895, who was the daughter of Rev. David Anderson, Reba was born May 31, 1865.

He was the Grand Master of the Kansas Ancient Free & Accepted Masons, a position he retired from in February 1913. In the 2010s, when the Grand Lodge of Kansas vacated its building in Topeka in a rush, Grand Master Hutchinson's Past Grand Master's apron was found in the trash being removed from the building and was rescued by a former grand lodge officer.

He was president of the Kansas Bar association in 1911, and from 1911 until 1927 served as secretary of the Kansas state board of bar examiners.

== Career ==
He worked as an attorney in Ulysses, Kansas, until in October 1892 he was appointed by Governor Lyman U. Humphrey to be the judge of the 32nd judicial district when Theodosius Botkin resigned. He was then elected to continue in the position of District Judge, and was then re-elected for a second term by a strong majority. He was the busiest Kansas district judge and took to signing W. E. Hutchinson rather than his full name to save time. In 1897 he suggested two amendments to the prohibitions laws and addressed a mass temperance meeting remarking that when public sentiment was against a law, that law could not be enforced. He was elected for further terms and was still firmly established in the seat in 1905, the same year that he decided he would seek to run for congress. In 1906 he announced that he would retire as district judge at the end of his term and pursue a political career seeking to serve as congressman for the seventh district. After his failure to move into politics, on January 11, 1907, he announced he would retire on January 14, 1907, and resume law practice in Garden City, Kansas.

In 1921 he formed a new law form with C. R. Hope and A. M Fleming called "Hutchinson, Hope and Fleming".

In January 1925 he was offered the position of pardon clerk by Governor Benjamin S. Paulen, he accepted. Later that year he was honored by having a school named after him, one of several Garden City schools named after city benefactors. He resigned from the post of pardon clerk February 1926 planning on returning to private practice, he was replaced by Judge A. S. Foulks.

On May 9, 1927, he was appointed to the Kansas Supreme Court to succeed Henry F. Mason who died the week before. He was appointed by Governor Paulen and took the oath on May 12, 1927, replacing Justice Mason his friend of nearly 40 years. In May of that year he filed to keep the post standing for the remaining unexpired term of Justice Mason, he stool as a Republican. The term for the No. 5 position on the court was due to end January 1933, and Hutchinson duly won the position for the remained on the term. In November 1932 he stood for and won a second term against the Democratic candidate Carl V. Rice.

In October 1933 the supreme court convened without Justice Hutchinson who was in hospital recovering from a mild heart attack, and the doctors advised him to refrain from service for a while to recover.

In 1936 he was one of six supreme court justices to be named as defendants by Hurst Majors in a million dollars damage suit, who also sought the justice to be ousted from office.

In 1938 Hutchinson decided to retire at the end of his term and Homer Hoch stepped up with 3 other Republican to fill the position and later won the seat.

He returned to private practice in Garden City until his death.

== Death ==
He died in his hotel apartment April 5, 1952, of a heart attack at the age of 91. He was survived by three adopted children, Mrs Rex Stowers Clements, Dr. James Hutchison and Dr. Ralph Hutchison.

Political offices
| Preceded by Henry Freeman Mason | Justice of the Kansas Supreme Court; 1927–1939 | Succeeded by Homer Hoch |
