= Schuyler W. Jackson =

American judge (1904–1964)

Schuyler Wood Jackson (November 24, 1904 – December 14, 1964) was a lawyer and a justice of the Kansas Supreme Court from April 7, 1958, to February 8, 1964.

== Life and education ==
He was born November 24, 1904, in Eureka, Kansas to Fred S. Jackson and Inez Sara Wood Jackson. He attended Topeka public schools before going on to graduate in 1927 from Washburn University with a Bachelor of Arts degree. He then went to Harvard Law School to obtain his law degree in 1930.

Although a dedicated man of law, he loved the outdoors including hunting and fishing. He gave his time and expertise to his church, the Grace Cathedral, as well as being involved in professorial organisations and civic clubs. He was a member of the American Society of International Law, the American Judicature Society and the Phi Alpha Delta legal fraternity.

== Career ==
He started his career practising law from 1930 until 1939 in Topeka, Kansas before going on to serve the Supreme Court from 1939 till 1947 first as a research clerk for three years, then as court reporter for the next five.

During his service to the court he was also a part-time professor at the Washburn University School of Law from 1945 till 1947 and lectured in International Law.

He was appointed as Dean of the Law School in 1948 and remained so until 1958 when he was appointed to the Kansas Supreme Court. He was appointed April 7, 1958, by democratic Governor George Docking to replace Fred Hall, and he was immediately sworn in by Chief Justice Jay S. Parker. Later that year he ran against John C. McCall to retain the position No.1 seat and won the next six year term on the court. He was a Democrat at the time which was considered not to be in his favor.

He fell on ice outside his home in January 1962 breaking his hip, and even with two surgeries his health declined to the point it caused him to retire in 1964 before the end of his full term. John F. Fontron was then appointed by Governor John Anderson to succeed him.

He was considered a legal scholar who had a breadth and depth of understanding of law and the complete legal system. In 1947 he was a runner up in the Ross Essay Competition awarded an "Honourable Mention" for his essay on "International Legislation - Discussion of Methods For Improvement", which was then published in full in Volume 34 of the American Bar Association Journal.

== Death ==
He died in a Topeka hospital December 14, 1964, aged 60 a few months after retiring from the supreme court. He was survived by his wife Ester and a son Fred S. Jackson, who was also a lawyer.

Political offices
Preceded by Fred Hall	Justice of the Kansas Supreme Court; 1958–1964	Succeeded by John F. Fontron
