= David Prager (judge) =

American judge (1918–2002)

David Prager (October 30, 1918 – June 30, 2002) was a justice of the Kansas Supreme Court from December 4, 1971, to January 12, 1987, serving as chief justice from January 12, 1987, to September 1, 1988.

He was succeeded as Chief Justice by Robert H. Miller when he retired after 17 years of service to the court. The vacated supreme court seat was filled by Frederick N. Six.

From 1946 till 1959, he practised with law firm Rooney & Dickerson, that later became Rooney, Dickerson, Prager & Crow. He then became a judge for the 3rd judicial district, Shawnee County, Kansas from 1959 till 1971 when he was appointed to the supreme court. He also lectured on law part-time at Washburn University School of Law from 1948 till 1968. In 1954, he stood as a Democratic candidate for the Kansas House of Representatives.

He was born October 30, 1918, in Fort Scott, and moved in 1946 to Topeka after returning from service as an officer on a destroyer in World War II. He served the United States Navy from 1942 till 1946. He earned his law degree from the University of Kansas in 1939.

He died June 30, 2002, in Topeka, Kansas, leaving behind his wife Dorothy Schroeter Prager, his son David, and his daughter Diane.

Legal offices
Preceded by Alfred G. Schroeder	Chief Justice of the Kansas Supreme Court; 1987–1988	Succeeded by Robert H. Miller
Preceded by Earl Eugene O'Connor	Justice of the Kansas Supreme Court; 1971–1987	Succeeded by Frederick N. Six
