= Austin M. Cowan =

American judge (1885–1949)

Austin M. Cowan (1885 – June 13, 1949) was a justice of the Kansas Supreme Court from June 9, 1948, to November 30, 1948.

Cowan was appointed to the court to fill the vacancy caused by the death of Allen Banks Burch on May 31, 1948. This was a temporary appointment pending an election of Robert T. Price who completed the unexpired term of Burch.

Prior to his short service to the supreme court he had practised law for 38 years in other forums.

He was born 1885 in Valley Falls, Kansas later moving to Parsons, Kansas with his family at the age of 12. He earned his law degree in 1911 from the University of Michigan Law School, and served during World War II in the navy.

He died June 13, 1949, at the age of 63, along with his wife Edwina in a plane crash near the Wichita airport.

Political offices
Preceded by Allen Banks Burch	Justice of the Kansas Supreme Court; 1948–1948	Succeeded by Robert T. Price
