= Perry L. Owsley =

American judge (1915–1979)

Perry Lyndon Owsley (April 3, 1915 – June 12, 1979) was a justice of the Kansas Supreme Court from September 24, 1971 to December 31, 1978. He had originally been nominated in 1966 but was not selected at that time. Owsley was appointed to the court after the retirement of Robert T. Price, and was a Democrat. Prior to the position he had been a district court judge, and has served as special examiner for the Kansas Corporation Commission.

He obtained his law degree in 1938 from Washburn University, Topeka.

He died June 12, 1979, aged 64, of an apparent hear attack leaving behind a wife and three children.

Political offices
Preceded by Robert T. Price	Justice of the Kansas Supreme Court; 1971–1978	Succeeded by Harold S. Herd
