= William Redwood Smith =

American judge (1851–1935)

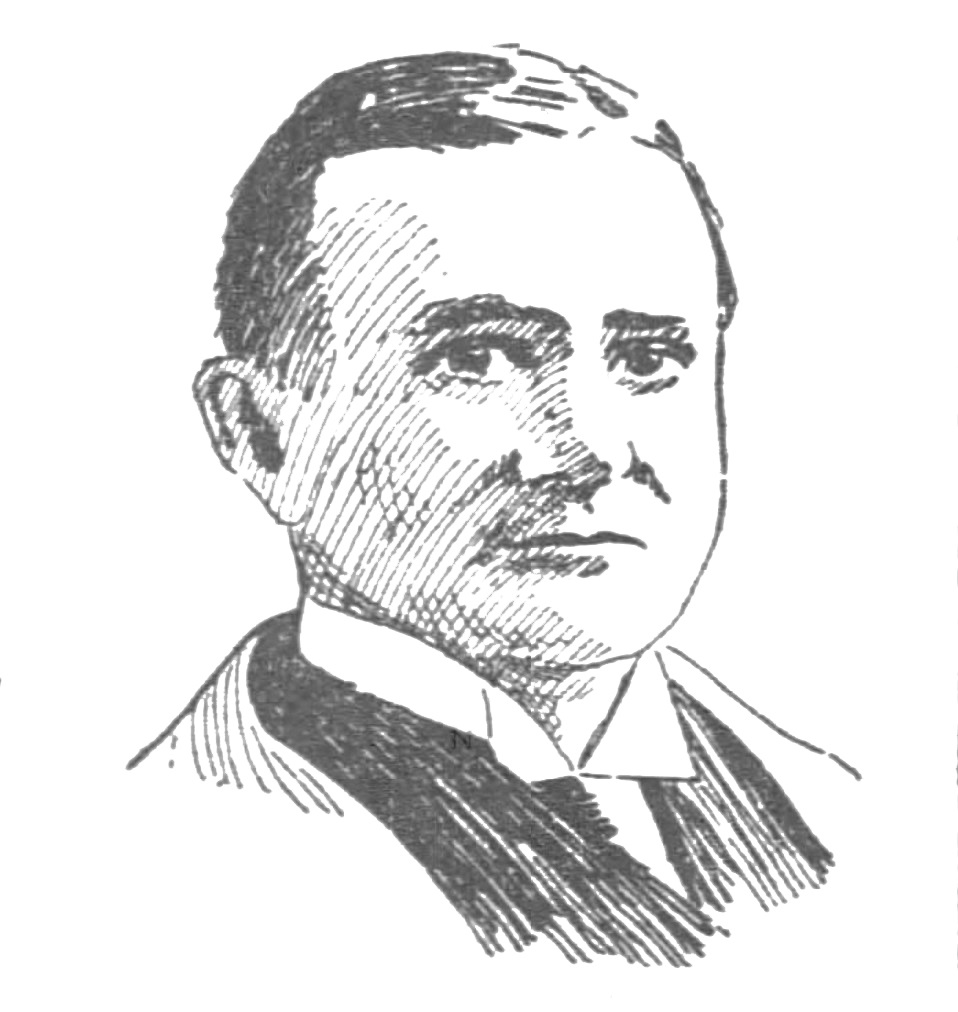
Kansas Supreme Court Justice William Redwood Smith in 1905

William Redwood Smith (1851 – October 18, 1935) was a justice of the Kansas Supreme Court from January 9, 1899 to July 1, 1905.

== Early life, education, and career ==
Born in Illinois, Smith came to Kansas with his parents in 1858 and settled on a farm in Jefferson County. Two years later the family moved to Atchison, Kansas. Smith graduated from Kenyon College in Ohio, in 1872, and from the University of Michigan Law School in 1874. He then opened a law office at Atchison, and built up a lucrative practice, also serving for a time as the county attorney. In 1892 he moved to Kansas City, Kansas, and with two other prominent lawyers, also formerly of Atchison, opened the law office of Mills, Wells & Smith. When Wells retired, it became Mills, Smith & Hobbs, until Smith retired from practice in 1898 to take a position on the state supreme court.

== Judicial service and later life ==
Smith was nominated for a seat on the Kansas Supreme Court by the Kansas Republican Party, at the Hutchinson convention of 1898, without any opposition to speak of. He won the general elected by a large majority, and in 1904 was re-elected to another term, "by the biggest vote ever given a state officer in Kansas". He resigned from the court in 1905 to become the general counsel for the Atchison, Topeka and Santa Fe Railway. Governor Edward W. Hoch replaced Smith on the court with Silas Wright Porter, reasoning that because Smith was from Wyandotte County, his successor should be appointed from that county.

Smith remained in that position with the railway company until his retirement in 1933, necessitated by declining health.

== Personal life and death ==
Smith was a lover of cats, owning so many that at one point a neighbor persuaded the Topeka City Council to enact a limit on the number of cats allowed in one household. Smith fought the ordinance, which was eventually invalidated by the state supreme court.

Smith died in his home in Topeka, Kansas, at the age of 84.

== Attribution ==
Text on this page was adapted from The Medico-legal Journal, Vol. 18 (1900), a work in the public domain.

Political offices
Preceded by Stephen Haley Allen	Justice of the Kansas Supreme Court; 1899–1905	Succeeded by Silas Wright Porter
