= Lucy Browne Johnston =

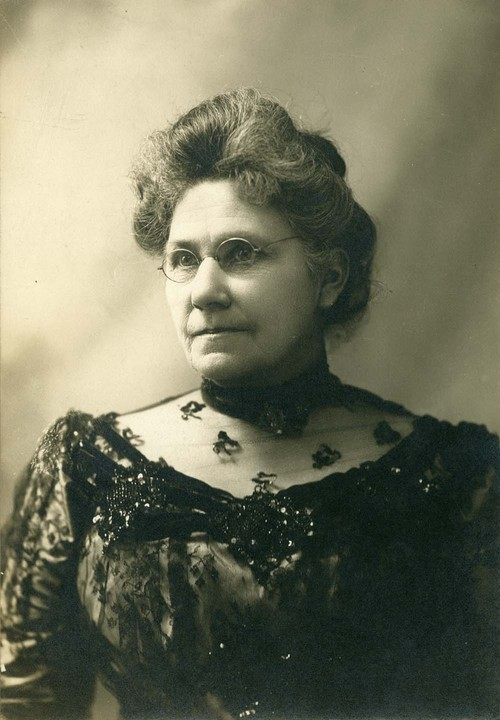
- Born: Lucy Browne; April 7, 1846; Camden, Ohio, U.S.
- Died: February 17, 1937 (aged 90); Topeka, Kansas, U.S.
- Education: Western Female Seminary
- Spouse: William Agnew Johnston (m. 1875)

Lucy Browne Johnston (April 7, 1846 – February 17, 1937) was an American social and political reformer and women's suffrage activist. She was involved with various social movements including Prohibition, women's enfranchisement, women's education through the women's club movement, and the traveling library movement.

== Early life ==
Johnston was born on April 7, 1846, to Robert and Margaret Browne on a farm in Camden, Ohio. Johnston spent her childhood in Camden, attending and finishing grade school there. Camden did not have a library during Johnston's childhood; Johnston's discovery of a shelf of books intended for the public school in her doctor's office inspired her to take up the cause of traveling libraries later in life.

== Higher education and marriage ==
Johnston left Camden after finishing grade school to attend the Western Female Seminary in Oxford, Ohio. Johnston graduated in 1866 with a degree doctor of laws, and then returned to Camden to teach at a grade school for four years. In 1875, Johnston married William Agnew Johnston, a Canadian-born lawyer who was recently elected to the Kansas Legislature and would serve as a Justice for the Kansas Supreme Court from 1884 to 1935. The newly married couple moved to Kansas and had two children, Margaret and John.

== Activism ==
Johnston served on many club and organization boards throughout her lifetime, including the Library Extension Committee of General Federation of Women's Clubs and the Kansas Equal Suffrage Association. Johnston's efforts as president of the Kansas Equal Suffrage Association contributed to the successful ratification of the Equal Suffrage Amendment in Kansas. Kansas ratified in amendment in 1912. It took several more years for the amendment to be ratified nationwide and in 1920 Nineteenth Amendment to the United States Constitution.

In her role as the chair for the Library Extension Committee of General Federation of Women's Clubs, Johnston was responsible for the expansion of the Kansas Traveling Library's collection and for reviewing and accepting applications from a person or a club to receive a traveling library. In addition, the people who sent in the applications for traveling libraries often included letters to Johnston about why they needed books and what kind of books they wanted.

Johnston was also a member of a committee for the Kansas Social Science Federation, the formation of which was to petition the Kansas legislature to create a Traveling Libraries Commission within the Kansas state library. After a lack of support and funding, a statute establishing the Traveling Libraries Commission as a part of the state library passed in 1899, and Johnston served as a member of the commission. The commission continued Johnston's crusade to provide books to reading clubs throughout the state of Kansas.

== Death ==
Johnston's husband, William, died in January 1937. Johnston died one month later in her Topeka, Kansas, home on February 17, 1937, from a two-year illness.

== Commemoration ==
A painting by Phyllis Garibay-Coon depicting her and other Kansas suffragists was unveiled at the Kansas Statehouse in January 2025. It is titled "Rebel Women" and is the first art installation by any woman artist to be in the Kansas Statehouse.
