= Silas Wright Porter =

American judge (1857–1937)

His Honor Silas Wright Porter
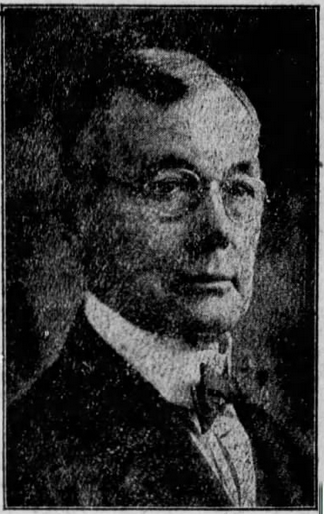
- Justice Porter, circa 1922

Justice, Kansas Supreme Court
- In office July 1, 1905 – January 8, 1923
- Preceded by: William Redwood Smith
- Succeeded by: Richard Joseph Hopkins

Personal details
- Born: January 1, 1857 Warren County, Illinois
- Died: May 17, 1937 (aged 80) Kansas
- Party: Republican
- Education: Monmouth College
- Profession: Attorney, Professor of Law

Silas Wright Porter (January 1, 1857 – May 17, 1937) was a justice of the Kansas Supreme Court from July 1, 1905, to January 8, 1923.

== Life and education ==
He was born January 1, 1857, in Warren County, Illinois on a farm near Monmouth, Illinois the son of Judge John Porter and Mary Ellen (Robbert) Porter. Raised and educated in Monmouth he obtained a Bachelor of Arts degree from Monmouth College in 1879. He then continued his studies at the college and obtained a Master of Arts degree in 1882, followed by his Doctor of Laws degree in 1907. His final education in preparation for the bar was done in his father office, and he was admitted to the bar in 1881.

He taught in the district school for one term while still at college, and a second term after his graduation.

In 1887, he married a Monmouth native Jessie Kirkpatrick Babcock who was the daughter of George Babcock originally from Wales, Massachusetts.

He was a sincere Republican, and he became the chairman of the Republican state convention in Kansas in 1900. He was a Presbyterian and a mason, as well as belonging to several clubs, including the Topeka Country Club, the Knife and Fork club of Kansas City, Missouri and the Elks club of Kansas City, Kansas.

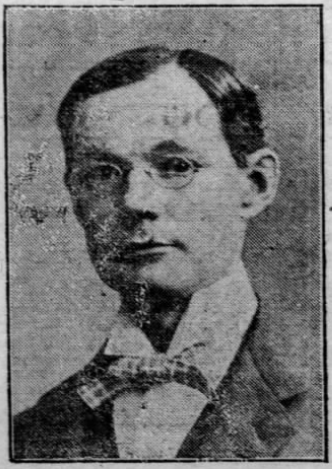
Silas W. Porter circa 1906

== Career ==
After obtaining the bar in 1881 he joined his father in a partnership with whom he did five years of private practice. For three years of this partnership he also served as the Monmouth city attorney from 1882 to 1885.

He left the partnership when he moved to Kansas in 1886 and was duly elected the Ness County attorney the same year, a position he served for two years. Leaving Ness County in 1890 he relocated to Kansas City, Kansas to serve in private practice and became a well known member of the city bar.

In 1889, he ran for the Republican nomination for a district judge position, but was unsuccessful. He also made a run for congress in 1902 but again was unsuccessful.

For several years Porter lectured at the Kansas University school of law.

Porter was appointed to the supreme court by governor Edward W. Hoch to fill the position vacated by the resignation of William Redwood Smith who left to become general counsel of the Santa Fe railroad. Hoch reasoned that because Smith was from Wyandotte County, his successor should be appointed from the same county. Porter found out about his appointment to the court by reading about it in the morning paper on June 29, 1905.

His long service to the court meant that his name was not just known within Kansas but also he was recognized as a prominent justice across the United States.

In 1922, Porter lost in the primary for the republican ticket for another term on the supreme court to Richard Joseph Hopkins, the then current attorney general who achieved over 52% of the vote.

After his supreme court service he went on to be appointed the referee of bankruptcy in March 1923, and at the same time moved to Topeka, Kansas officially even though he has been residing there for many years.

== Death ==
He died May 17, 1937, in the Kansas state hospital after a long illness, and he was survived by his wife, four sons and a daughter.

Political offices
Preceded by William Redwood Smith	Justice of the Kansas Supreme Court; 1905–1923	Succeeded by Richard Joseph Hopkins
