= Clair E. Robb =

American judge (1905–1965)

Clair E. Robb (April 13, 1905 – August 6, 1965) was a justice of the Kansas Supreme Court from January 10, 1955, to August 6, 1965. Robb, a Republican, was appointed to the Supreme Court seat vacated by Hugo T. Wedell, who did not seek re-election at the end of his term.

Prior to the Supreme Court appointment, the Wichita native had been serving as a district court judge for 10 years. After serving four years as a judge of the Wichita city court, he then severed the 3rd division of the Sedgwick County District Court before becoming the presiding court judge of all four county divisions.

Robb was succeeded by Robert H. Kaul who was appointed after his death while still in service. His predecessor Hugo T. Wedell in his position of chairman of the Supreme court nominating commission called for recommendations in addition to the ones already made for the replacement of William J. Wertz that was already ongoing.

He first went to the University of Kansas and then received a law degree from the Washburn University School of Law in 1933 where at the age of 19 he had declared that someday he would serve on the Kansas Supreme Court.

He died Friday August 6, 1965 from a heart seizure at his home and was taken to Stormont Vail Hospital where he was pronounced dead on arrival. He was survived by his wife, a son and a daughter.

Political offices
Preceded by Hugo T. Wedell	Justice of the Kansas Supreme Court; 1955–1965	Succeeded by Robert H. Kaul
