= Daniel Mulford Valentine =

American judge and politician (1830–1907)

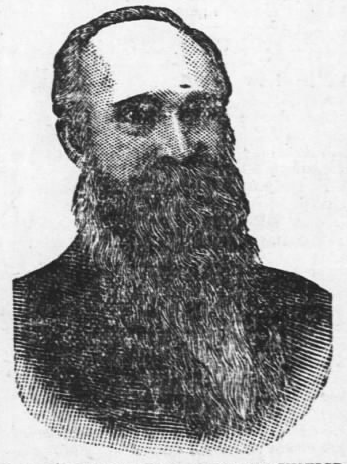
- Daniel Mulford Valentine (circa 1892)

Kansas House of Representatives
- In office 1862–1862

Kansas State Senate
- In office 1863–1864

Kansas Supreme Court
- In office 1869 – January 9, 1893

Personal details
- Born: June 18, 1830 Shelby County, Ohio
- Died: June 18, 1907 (aged 76) Topeka, Kansas
- Party: Republican

Daniel Mulford Valentine (June 18, 1830 – August 5, 1907) was a member of the Kansas House of Representatives in 1862, a member of the Kansas State Senate in 1863 and 1864 and justice of the Kansas Supreme Court from January 11, 1869, to January 9, 1893.

== Life and education ==
He was born June 18, 1830, in Shelby County, Ohio, where he remained until he moved to Iowa in 1854. His education was from the common schools and two academies, and he also taught school for three years while still in Ohio whilst at the same time also studying law.

Valentine was a Republican, religiously independent, and an abolitionist. While young although raised a Christian he was also interested in spiritualism and wrote Spiritual Rapping in 1852 proposing a reconciliation of Christianity and spiritualism. He had journals where he contemplated thoughts on the nature of mankind and religion and they showed that his own faith moved from open mindedness in his youth to a view of man as full of sin and he was obsessed with the depravity of man and personal damnation. He pointed to all the sex, polygamy and adultery in the Bible but stated that man was even more degraded and selfish, and boldly stated that "No man cares for any woman" and that the worship of God was mostly the selfish desire to avoid Hell and grab "happiness and prosperity of everlasting life" for oneself.

He was a strong supporter of Abraham Lincoln and attended two speeches that he gave while in Kansas, and although he made fun of his style he stated that he believed the moral substance of his speeches was compelling.

He married Martha Root June 26, 1855, and together they had fives sons and four daughters. One son was Louis Franklin Valentine, born December 15, 1877, who became a newspaper publisher and was a member of the Kansas House of Representatives in 1939 and 1941. Another was Delbert A Valentine, who became a clerk to the supreme court and died April 1931. The other sons were J. W. Valentine in the lumber business, Harry E. Valentine, who worked with his father, and Ralph E. Valentine, who worked in real estate and finance. Their daughters were Mrs. A. A. Godard, Mrs J. F. Merrick, Martha Valentine and Lillian Valentine.

Valentine and his wife visited Kansas in 1858 travelling through the east of the state in a one-horse rig visiting Leavenworth, Topeka and Lawrence amongst others, then after returning to Iowa for a while they moved to Leavenworth, Kansas, in July 1859. About a year later in 1860 they moved to Peoria, the current Franklin County seat at the time, followed just two years with a move to Ohio City, which no longer exists, and then again following the county seat they moved to Ottawa, Kansas, in 1864. They lived in Ottawa for around ten years raising their family until 1875, when they did one final move to Topeka, Kansas, and lived at 625 Polk Street, which was his home until his death.

== Career ==
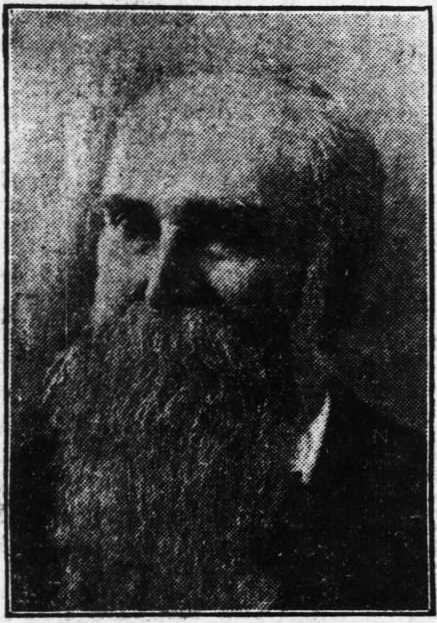
Daniel Mulford Valentine (circa 1907)

His career started outside of law as a county surveyor from 1855 until 1857 in Adair County, Iowa, a position he held whilst continuing to study law. He was admitted to the bar March 9, 1858 and became the county attorney for Adair county.

In 1861 he was elected to serve in the 1862 session of the Kansas House of Representatives, and in 1962 was elected to the Kansas State Senate and served in 1863 and 1864.

Next he was elected to be a district judge from January 1865 till January 1869 for the 4th District covering the south east of Kansas including the counties of Douglas, Franklin, Johnson, Bourbon, Linn and Miami. Around this time he was also on the board of directors for the Leavenworth, Lawrence & Fort Gibson Railroad Company.

When the term of justice Lawrence Dudley Bailey came to an end Valentine stood for election on the Republican ticket for the Supreme Court position, winning the nomination against Bailey and four others. He was duly elected and started the first of his twenty-four years of service to the court the following January.

His service to the court included him writing 1572 opinions as well as assisting with other court opinions. He was known as an innovator and for having a "bold moral voice" for the citizens that were most vulnerable. With a strong belief that women should be integrated into politics he used a strict reading of the constitution to allow women to vote in local elections as the constitution only mentioned state elections when limiting the vote to white males. In another case he stood up for the rights of women to "not be trapped in loveless marriages" proposing that "mental cruelty" should be added as grounds for divorce. He also, unsuccessfully, attempted to integrate Kansas schools which had been segregated after a large influx of African-Americans to the state in the 1860s and 70s. In the case of Board of Education vs Tonnon his opinion included the postulate that was it not better that "all children should mingle together and learn to know each other"

After being elected for multiple terms he stood again as the Republican nomination one final time in 1892, but was beaten by Stephen Haley Allen, running as a Populist, by 162,338 to 158,191.

He served out the remainder of his term, expiring January 9, 1893, and planned to resume his practice in his home town of Topeka, and did so holding a leading position at the bar.

When he retired from the supreme court he returned to private practice in Topeka as the senior member of Valentine, Harkness & Godard for a year, and then again the senior member of Valentine, Harkness & Valentine the practice he stayed in until his death. The other members were his son Harry E. Valentine and his son-in-law A. A. Godard, and although he was a member until his death he did not take an active role in the final two years.

A few years before his death he had compiled a Digest on the Decisions of the Supreme Court and Courts of Appeal of Kansas and continued to update until his health gave out a few months before his death.

== Death ==
He died August 5, 1907, at his home in Topeka, Kansas, with a general breakdown from old age given as the reason. His health had been failing over the previous five to six months but had become serious a week before his death. He had spent much of the week slipping in and out of consciousness, and had been unconscious for several hours before dying. At the time of his death he was the oldest member of the state supreme court, and had served longer than any previous justice. He was buried in Topeka cemetery and was survived by his wife and all nine children with all by two, Mrs. J. F. Merrick and Miss Lillian Valentine, attending his funeral.

Political offices
Preceded by Lawrence Dudley Bailey	Justice of the Kansas Supreme Court; 1869–1893	Succeeded by Stephen Haley Allen
