= Stephen Haley Allen =

American judge (1847–1931)

Stephen Haley Allen (March 19, 1847 – October 26, 1931) was a justice of the Kansas Supreme Court from January 9, 1893, to January 9, 1899.

== Early life, education, and career ==
Born in Sinclairville, Chautauqua County, New York, Allen was educated in the village school, until the end of his formal education in 1862. Thereafter self-taught, he studied civil engineering, and then read law with Hon. Obed Edson to gain admission to the bar in Buffalo on May 5, 1869. Allen moved first to Missouri, and then moved to Pleasanton, Kansas, as of February 1, 1870. He practiced law there for twenty years, until 1990.

== Judicial service ==
Allen was elected as a judge of the Sixth Judicial District of Kansas in November 1890. He was defeated in a bid for re-election in 1891, but in 1892 was elected to a six-year term as a justice of the Kansas Supreme Court by the combined vote of Democrats and Populists, taking office in January 1893. Allen was the first justice to serve on the court who was not a Republican.

On the court, Allen dissented from the court's decision in the 1893 case of in re Gunn, in which two rival versions of the Kansas House of Representatives had been organized. The majority of the court decided to take jurisdiction of the case, and held the Republican organization to be the legal one. Allen's dissent asserted that the court had no jurisdiction over the question. Allen was nominated for reelection by both the Populist and Democratic conventions in 1898, but was defeated, along with the balance of the ticket in that election. He then returned to the practice of law in Topeka, Kansas.

== Death ==
Allen died in Topeka at the age of 84. Pallbearers at his funeral included then-Chief Justice William Agnew Johnston, Justice Frank Doster, and federal judges George Thomas McDermott and Richard Joseph Hopkins.

Political offices
Preceded by Daniel Mulford Valentine	Justice of the Kansas Supreme Court; 1893–1899	Succeeded by William Redwood Smith
