= John F. Fontron =

American judge (1903–1982)

John Felix Fontron (December 2, 1903 – January 25, 1982) was a lawyer and judge. He served as justice of the Kansas Supreme Court from March 5, 1964, to October 1, 1975.

== Life and education ==
Born in McPherson County, Kansas December 2, 1903, Fontron moved with his family to Hutchinson, Kansas, in 1915. He lived there for the rest of his life, apart from during his military service.

He had his formative education in McPherson and Hutchinson public schools, and his university education at the University of Kansas. He started his undergraduate education in 1921 and after two years moved to the University of Kansas Law School obtaining his law degree in 1926. On his graduation the quality of his scholarship was awarded by being elected to the Order of the Coif. While at the law school he was a member of the Phi Alpha Delta legal fraternity.

In 1964, he was awarded by the University of Kansas Law School the first award for Distinguished Service.

== Early career ==
He started his career in the law firm of Shaffer and Tincher and his first government post was deputy county attorney in 1926 under Charles Hall. He later joined the law firm of Hall, Fontron and Holmes.

== Military service ==
During World War II he enlisted as a private to serve in the 301st Ordnance Company in March 1942, then was commissioned into the department of the judge advocate general in the following December. He served overseas in India, Australia and New Guinea. After serving four years, a he was discharged at the rank of major.

== Later career ==
Not long after he returned from his war service, he was elected to serve as the Reno County attorney from 1947 till 1951, then was appointed the District Judge for Reno from 1953 until being called to the Supreme Court.

Fontron was appointed on March 3, 1964, to the Supreme Court by Governor John Anderson to succeed Schuyler W. Jackson who had resigned for health reasons. He was elected as a Republican while Anderson had been a Democrat. He was the first member to be selected under the new non-partisan selection method introduced in 1958. He was then elected to continue in the No.1 position the court in November 1966.

His service to the court saw him write 389 options among which 319 were for the majority and 49 dissenting. His opinions were recognised as having a mature grasp of the principles of law involved in each case and having a distinctive literary quality An example of which for a case involving insurance: "But here we encounter the omnipresent exclusions, of which there were seventeen in all. Thus the policy provideth and the policy taketh away"

In another case in 1973 he upheld that cock-fighting was not illegal under the present state laws invoking George Washington, Thomas Jefferson, Alexander Hamilton and Abraham Lincoln stating that the first three were "devotees" and pronouncing "As long as the Almighty permitted intelligent men, created in His image and likeness, to fight in public and kill each other while the world looks on approvingly, it's not for me to deprive chickens of the same privilege".

While serving on the Supreme Court he also taught legal ethics at Washburn University School of Law, an institution that awarded him a special honor in 1974.

When Fontron retired from the supreme court in 1975 Robert H. Miller was appointed by Governor Robert Bennett to replace him. Fontron continued to be active in law as council to a respected law firm, and performing judicial services by assignment.

He had been working for a few years with other judges and lawyers to produce a book on the history of the Kansas Bar Association, he had been the committee chairman and wrote the first chapter. He died before seeing its publication and the favourable reception it had.

== Death ==
He died January 25, 1982, in an El Paso hospital where he had been since a car accident on January 19, 1982. His wife was driving the car when it went off the road and rolled over; she had only minor injuries. The police thought she had "apparently dozed off, then over-corrected" leading to the accident that left her husband with a fractured cervical spine. This was not his first serious car accident; in August 1949, the then-County Attorney had an accident that resulted in a collapsed left lung and bruised kidney.

Political offices
Preceded by Schuyler W. Jackson	Justice of the Kansas Supreme Court; 1964–1975	Succeeded by Robert H. Miller
