= Edward Larson (Kansas judge) =

American judge (born 1932)

Edward Larson (born 1932) was a justice of the Kansas Supreme Court from September 1, 1995, to September 4, 2002.

He was appointed to the supreme court to fill the vacancy caused by the retirement of Chief Justice Richard Winn Holmes, with Kay McFarland filling the Chief Justice position. When he retired from the court due to the mandatory retirement age of 70 Lawton Nuss was appointed to fill the vacant position. He then continued to work as a senior judge.

In 2014 he was one of three University of Kansas School of Law alumni to be awarded the schools Distinguished Alumni Award. In 1981 and 1998 he was awarded the Outstanding Service Award from the Kansas Bar Association. In 2016 he was given an honorary life membership by the Washburn University School of Law.

Born in Lincoln County, he graduated from Kansas State University in 1954. He was commissioned a 2nd lieutenant in the United States Air Force and served on active duty from 1954 to 1957. He earned his law degree in 1960 from the University of Kansas School of Law. After obtaining his law degree he started practicing law and serving as a Hays municipal judge. He then served as an appellate judge for the Kansas Court of Appeals prior to his supreme court appointment.

He is a senior governor for the University of Kansas School of Law.

Political offices
Preceded by Richard Winn Holmes	Justice of the Kansas Supreme Court; 1995–2002	Succeeded by Lawton Nuss
