= Harry K. Allen =

American politician and judge

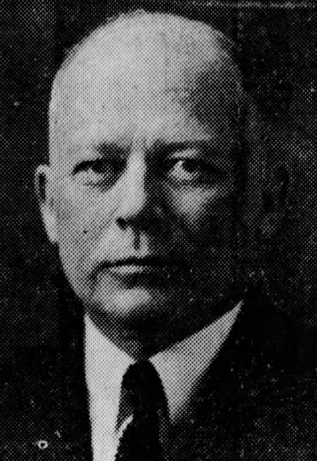
Dean Harry K. Allen (c. 1924)

Harry Kyle Allen (1872 – July 14, 1959) was an Oklahoma state senator, a dean of Washburn University School of Law and a justice of the Kansas Supreme Court from January 11, 1937 to January 11, 1943.

== Early life and education ==
He was born in 1872 in Gallatin, Missouri then later moved to Cameron, Missouri with his family. He then moved back to Gallatin, Missouri later in his life to further his education.

He went into the law office of Joshua W. Alexander to start studying law. With this experience he obtained his law degree from Washington University in St. Louis in just one year. He then moved back again to Gallatin, Missouri to start his career.

He married Florence Daugherty Smith in Topeka in 1920, they had no children by birth but adopted a baby girl in 1922.

== Career ==
After getting his law degree he served as the Gallatin city attorney and then elected the Daviess County attorney in 1900. He then moved to Kansas City persuaded by his brother to become an examiner of land titles in his brothers real estate firm. He worked in Kansas City until 1903 before moving to Chickasaw and starting up a law office with fellow Washington University student Charles Von Weiss. They moved the land office to Ardmore, Oklahoma where he almost exclusively practiced land title law until 1909.

In 1909 he was elected to the Oklahoma state legislator as the senator for Carter, Murray and Love counties, serving just one term.

He moved back to Kansas City where he practiced law in a private practice from 1913 until 1918. In 1918 he moved to Topeka, Kansas, where he found his way to Washburn University School of Law as a teacher as they were lacking one with expertise in land titles and property law. The first semester he taught just one class and continued his private practice, from the second semester he started to take on more classes. He went on to become the Dean of the school in 1922 and remained through till 1936.

He was persuaded by friends and some other Democratic lawyers, after getting approval from his wife, to run for the supreme court. During the campaign he only made two political speeches, keeping to mostly legal and constitutional issues in other speeches.

He was elected November 1936 to the Kansas Supreme Court defeating Rousseau Angelus Burch who had been on the court from 1902 and the chief justice by seniority since 1935. As a Democrat he was one of the few to serve on the Kansas Supreme Court. His win was accredited to two factors, these being union labor who had been angered by Burch and the large number of Washburn students that had known him during his tenure as teacher and dean at Washburn. He hoped that during his time on the court he could help remove the excess technical legal lore related to the states property and trusts laws, that he stated helped no one but the business of lawyers.

He ran for a second term but was beaten in the polls by Republican Jay S. Parker. After his single six year term he returned to private practice as well as doing some part-time teaching at Washburn.

While still the dean just after he was elected to the supreme court he met a young Clair E. Robb as a student who claimed that he too would be on the court some day. Allen let him try on the court 's robe and told him if he was elected to the court he could have the robe. In 1954, when Robb was duly elected, as promised, he was wearing Allen's robe when sworn in.

== Death ==
He died Tuesday July 14, 1959 at the age of 86 in a Kansas hospital after a long illness. He was survived by his wife and adopted daughter. He had two brothers, Sidney and Glenn, that has already passed prior to his death. After his death alumni from Washburn worked to set up a memorial fund in hope of funding a teaching chair and scholarship.

Political offices
Preceded by Rousseau Angelus Burch	Justice of the Kansas Supreme Court; 1937–1943	Succeeded by Jay S. Parker
