= Judge Ellis =

Judge Ellis may also refer to:

- Frank Burton Ellis (1907–1969), judge of the United States District Court for the Eastern District of Louisiana
- Powhatan Ellis (1790–1863), judge of the United States District Court for the District of Mississippi
- Sara L. Ellis (born 1969), judge of the United States District Court for the Northern District of Illinois
- T. S. Ellis III (1940–2025), judge of the United States District Court for the Eastern District of Virginia

== See also ==
- Justice Ellis (disambiguation)
