= Hugo T. Wedell =

American judge (1890–1975)

Hugo T. Wedell (January 3, 1890 – April 13, 1975) was a justice of the Kansas Supreme Court from July 3, 1935, to January 10, 1955.

== Early life and education ==
He was born January 3, 1890, in Hillsboro, Kansas. For a while he was a professional baseball player, joining the Tri-State League's York White Roses for the 1913 season. He obtained his bachelor's degree in 1915 and his law degree in 1920, both from the University of Kansas. He enrolled as a private in the Signal Corps during World War I but did not go overseas as the armistice was signed.

== Career ==
He was a lawyer in Neosho County and was appointed to investigate the Ronald Finney Bond Scandal. He unsuccessfully ran for the state senate in 1930.

Wendell had been working as the Chanute City Attorney for a few months when he was appointed to the Kansas Supreme Court to fill the place vacated by the resignation of the former Chief Justice William Agnew Johnston. He was appointed to serve for the remainder of the term, due to expire January 1, 1937. Both Wedell and Johnston were Republicans. He continued on the court for three full terms, being re-elected in 1936, 1942 and 1948. He declined to run for reelection in 1954, and Clair E. Robb, a Republican, was appointed to replace him.

== Personal life and death ==
He married Hazel Houston and had at least one daughter.

He died in Wichita, Kansas, at the age of 85 on Sunday April 13, 1975.

Political offices
Preceded by William Agnew Johnston	Justice of the Kansas Supreme Court; 1935–1955	Succeeded by Clair E. Robb
