= Robert T. Price =

American judge (1903–1982)

Robert T. Price (June 7, 1903 – July 24, 1982) was a justice of the Kansas Supreme Court from November 30, 1948, to May 1, 1966, and chief justice from May 1, 1966, to September 1, 1971. He filled the position of Justice of the Supreme Court No. 7 as the republican nominatee. He succeed Jay S. Parker who stepped down after 23 years as chief justice in May 1966. When he retired Perry L. Owsley, a Democrat was appointed to fill the court position with Harold R. Fatzer appointed as the new chief justice.

Price was born in Shawnee County, Kansas and was graduated from the University of Kansas. He served in the navy in World War II, and spent 6 months as a prosecutor in the Japanese war trials.

== Career ==
In 1948, Price ran for a seat on the Kansas Supreme Court. In August of that year Price pulled well ahead of three other candidates for the Republican primary nomination for the seat.

Legal offices
Preceded by Jay S. Parker	Chief Justice of the Kansas Supreme Court; 1966–1971	Succeeded by Harold R. Fatzer
Preceded by Austin M. Cowan	Justice of the Kansas Supreme Court; 1948–1966	Succeeded by Alex M. Fromme
