= Frank Doster =

American judge (1847–1933)

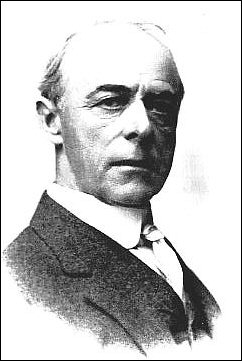
- Frank Doster (circa 1914)

7th Chief Justice of the Kansas Supreme Court
- In office January 11, 1897 – January 12, 1903
- Governor: John W. Leedy; William E. Stanley; Willis J. Bailey
- Preceded by: David Martin
- Succeeded by: William Agnew Johnston

District Judge for Marion, Kansas
- Incumbent
- Assumed office 1872

Personal details
- Born: January 19, 1847 Morgan County, Virginia, U.S.
- Died: February 25, 1933 (aged 86) Topeka, Kansas, U.S.
- Party: Republican (former); Greenback Union Labor; Populist; Democratic
- Children: Wade Doster + 2 other children
- Profession: Judge, lawyer, jurist

Frank Doster (January 19, 1847 – February 25, 1933) was a chief justice of the Kansas Supreme Court from January 11, 1897, to January 12, 1903.

== Early life, education, and career ==
Born in Morgan County, Virginia in 1847, Doster spent most of his childhood on a farm in Indiana. At the age of just 15 he enlisted for the civil war as part of the Eleventh Indiana Cavalry. After he served in the civil war then returned to Indiana and started to study law.

== Judicial service ==
Doster was elected district judge for Marion, Kansas in 1872, and served for multiple terms, having been elected as a Republican. His views progressed and he evolved to other affiliations such as the Greenback Union Labor, People's, and the Bryan wing of the Democratic parties. He was considered a prominent "champion of liberal ideology" within Kansas.

He has been attacked as a socialist and an anarchist due to his views on individual property rights. While still a district judge he had stated his belief that "the rights of a user of a thing are paramount to the rights of the owner". However, when running for the supreme court he claimed the quote was a misrepresentation of what he had said, and that it was applicable to only such situations as the rights to public utilities such as the railroad.

In 1896 Doster was elected to the position of Chief Justice of the Kansas Supreme Court for a six-year term. As a liberal he was elected as the 7th Chief Justice of the court by the Populists, Democrats and Free Silver Republicans. He was more radical in his thoughts and statements than in practice and his term as chief justice was characterised by a strict adherence to the common-law tradition. He was re-nominated in 1902 but even if elected would not retain the position due to a new Act to expand the court including a provision that the senior member of the court, William Agnew Johnston, would become the chief justice.

== Later life ==
After his term as chief justice in 1902 he remained in Topeka, Kansas becoming the assistant general attorney for the Missouri Pacific Railroad. He attempted to return to political office in 1914 but failed to obtain the nomination as the Democratic entry for the senate.

He continued to be interested in reform and championed issues such as industrial regulation and woman's suffrage, while opposing imperialism, prohibition and judicial nullification of social and economic legislation. He continued to follow Populism and in the 1920s championed internationalism, and was defensive of the Russian move to communism while denouncing child labor, prohibition, intolerance, fundamentalism, and the union of church and state.

He retired from active practice well before his death but continued in cases of those too poor to pay for legal services.

== Personal life and death ==
Doster married a girl from Illinois, and passed the bar exam in the same state. They then moved to Kansas where he started practising law in Marion, Kansas. He had a son, Captain Wade Doster, who was killed March 1920 by his wife. She was accused of shooting him, and then attempting unsuccessfully to kill herself.

Doster died at his home in 1933, at the age of 84, after having a stroke, being struck with paralysis while visiting John H. Riddle the day before. He died survived by his wife, two sons and one daughter, with just one of his sons not being present at his death.

Political offices
Preceded by David Martin	Chief Justice of the Kansas Supreme Court; 1897–1903	Succeeded by William Agnew Johnston
