= Evelyn Wilson =

American judge (1959–2026)

Justice of the Kansas Supreme Court
- In office January 24, 2020 – July 4, 2025
- Appointed by: Laura Kelly
- Preceded by: Lee A. Johnson
- Succeeded by: Larkin Walsh

Personal details
- Born: December 6, 1959 Smith Center, Kansas, U.S.
- Died: April 4, 2026 (aged 66) Topeka, Kansas, U.S.
- Education: Bethany College (BA); Washburn University (JD)

Evelyn Zabel Wilson (December 6, 1959 – April 4, 2026) was an American judge who served as a justice of the Kansas Supreme Court.

== Education ==
Wilson graduated from Bethany College in 1982 with a bachelor's degree in business and from Washburn University School of Law in 1985.

== Career ==
Wilson practiced law for 19 years in private practice. Her experience included time as a managing partner, and time as an adjunct professor at Washburn University School of Law.

== Judicial career ==
=== State court service ===
Wilson served Shawnee County as a District Judge from 2004 until her appointment as Chief Judge in 2014. She was reappointed Chief Judge in 2017.

=== Kansas Supreme Court ===
Wilson was one of 17 applicants to apply for the position. On October 19, 2019, the Supreme Court Nominating Commission submitted Wilson's name, along with two others to the Governor. On December 16, 2019, Governor Laura Kelly appointed Wilson to the seat on the Kansas Supreme Court vacated by the retirement of Lee A. Johnson on September 8, 2019. She was sworn in on January 24, 2020. She resigned on July 4, 2025.

== Personal life and death ==
A native Kansan, Wilson was born in Smith Center, Kansas, on December 6, 1959. Wilson and her husband, Mike, were members of First Lutheran Church in Topeka, where she also served as a Stephen Minister.

Wilson was diagnosed with ALS at some point prior to her resignation from the Kansas Supreme Court in 2025. She died of complications from this illness in Topeka on April 4, 2026, at the age of 66.

Legal offices
Preceded by Lee A. Johnson	Justice of the Kansas Supreme Court; 2020–2025	Succeeded by Larkin Walsh
