= William J. Wertz =

American politician and judge (1896–1987)

William Jennings Wertz (October 28, 1896 – March 10, 1987) was a lawyer, Kansas state senator from 1941 to 1942 and a justice of the Kansas Supreme Court from March 1, 1950, to December 4, 1950, and again from January 8, 1951, to October 1, 1965.

== Life and education ==
He was born October 28, 1896, in Bedford, Pennsylvania the son of Mr and Mrs S. W. Wertz, before moving to Wichita, Kansas where he went to high school.

He obtained his first degree from Ottawa University in Ottawa, Kansas. He then enrolled in the University of Kansas School of Law but his studies were disrupted by joining the Navy to serve in World War I. He signed up in July 1918 as a private and returned later that year to the Great Lakes Training Station where he was promoted to deputy instructor. He re-enrolled at the law school on his return, and later met his wife to be Miss Pauline Elouise Pingrey from Neodesha, Kansas, and whom he married February 11, 1920. In university Wertz was well known in the social circles on "the hill". During his vacations while at Kansas University he read law with local Attorney John W. Adams.

He was a member of the American Legion, Camber of Commerce and Masonic bodies as well as St. Paul's Lutheran Church.

== Career ==
After passing the bar he started working in 1919 for the John W. Adams firm of attorneys Adams & Adams in Wichita, Kansas.

After working for several years in private practice he ran for the county attorney as a Republican in 1926. He was elected and in 1927 became the Sedgwick County attorney, and made a notable impression. He convicted 35 criminals, won all 40 liquor cases he prosecuted and obtained 107 years worth of sentences all within the first four months in the position. During his first term as county attorney he was elected the President of the County Attorneys Association of the State of Kansas. In 1928 he ran and won a second term after a successful first, in which he convicted nine murders, over two hundred cases resulting in jail time for major crimes, and hundreds of misdemeanour convictions.

In 1930 Wertz and sheriff Charles Ohrvall were investigated for misconduct, but after an investigation into the law enforcement conditions in Sedgwick county the attorney general William A. Smith found no evidence to warrant a suit against either.

Wertz stood for State Senator in 1940 running on the Republican ticket, and won the district 27 seat and was just one of the 108 Republicans with only 17 Democrats elected.

In March 1942 Wertz was one several Senators to enter military service due to the ongoing World War II, this time with the Army. They did not resign immediately, and Wertz expressed that he expected to be in Omaha, Nebraska and able to attend the 1943 session. However he did then resign and his place was filled by William A. Kahrs. He served as a member of staff for the judge advocate general in the Army's headquarters in Washington. In September 1944 he was promoted from Major to Lieutenant colonel.

In 1948 Wertz was appointed as a District Judge in Sedgwick County but failed to file for the interim period from the election till the start of the new term, but Lloyd M. Kagey did file and won.

When Edward F. Arn resigned March 1, 1950 Wertz was appointed to the supreme court by Governor Frank Carlson and he filed for the next full term starting January 8, 1951. However he again failed to file for the remainder of the current term from the election until the start of the new term, and repeating history Lloyd M. Kagey did file and won the seat. Wertz won the election for the new term so Kagey served just 35 days on the court.

In 1952 Wertz wrote the courts unanimous opinion that it was illegal for private clubs to dispense liquor by the drink to members, reversing a decision of the district court.

Wertz announced his intention to retire on October 1, 1965, several month prior in July to give Governor William Avery time to choose a successor.

In 1975 he was appointed along with Assistant Attorney General Donald R Hoffman to examine files held by the Kansas Bureau of Investigation to determine which had no legitimate value for criminal action and destroy them. This was done when the Republican legislators raised issues that the bureau had been keeping files on both public officials and private citizens who have never been charged or arrested. After examining the 532 files Wertz recommended that 73 of the files should be destroyed.

== Death ==
He died March 10, 1987, and the supreme court held a special memorial session June 12 to honor him, with retired Chief Justice Harold R. Fatzer being one of the speakers. His wife Pauline had died before him in 1985 but he was survived by his three children, a son and two daughters.

Political offices
Preceded by Edward F. Arn; Lloyd M. Kagey	Justice of the Kansas Supreme Court; 1950–1950; 1951–1965	Succeeded by Lloyd M. Kagey; Earl E. O'Connor
