= Lee A. Johnson =

American judge

Lee Johnson

Justice of the Kansas Supreme Court
- In office January 8, 2007 – September 8, 2019
- Appointed by: Kathleen Sebelius
- Preceded by: Donald L. Allegrucci
- Succeeded by: Evelyn Wilson

Personal details
- Born: June 28, 1947 (age 79) Caldwell, Kansas, U.S.
- Party: Republican
- Education: University of Kansas; Washburn University School of Law

Lee A. Johnson (born June 28, 1947) is a former Kansas Supreme Court Justice appointed by Governor Kathleen Sebelius. He started on January 8, 2007, to replace retiring Justice Donald L. Allegrucci.

== Personal life ==
Lee A. Johnson was born June 28, 1947, in Caldwell, Kansas. He received a Bachelor of Science in Business Administration from the University of Kansas in 1969. Johnson attended Washburn University School of Law and graduated summa cum laude in 1980 with a Juris Doctor. He was a member of Phi Delta Phi. He is married to Donna and has two children, Jordan and Jennifer.

== Professional life ==
Upon graduating from KU, Johnson served two years on active duty with the U.S. Army Corps of Engineers and then became an insurance salesman for his family business.

After graduating from Washburn, Johnson went into private practice as an attorney for 21 years. He served as Mayor of Caldwell in 1975-1976 and Caldwell City Attorney from 1987 to 1997. He served as president of the Sumner County bar association in 1992. He also spent 16 years serving on the Sumner Mental Health board. In 2001 Johnson was appointed to the Kansas Court of Appeals. While there he authored 500 decisions.

Governor Kathleen Sebelius appointed Johnson to the Kansas Supreme Court in 2007 to replace Justice Donald L. Allegrucci who retired due to state mandated age limits. Johnson retired from the court on September 8, 2019.

Johnson voted against the death penalty in every case which came before the court, citing it as cruel and unusual.

Legal offices
Preceded by Donald L. Allegrucci	Justice of the Kansas Supreme Court; 2007–2019	Succeeded by Evelyn Wilson
