= William Agnew Johnston =

American politician and judge (1848–1937)

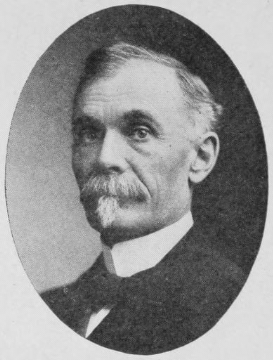
William Agnew Johnston, c. 1904

William Agnew Johnston (July 24, 1848 – January 23, 1937) was a Kansas State Representative in 1875, Kansas State Senator, justice of the Kansas Supreme Court from December 1, 1884, to January 12, 1903, and chief justice from January 12, 1903, to June 30, 1935.

== Life and education ==
Johnston was born July 24, 1848, in Pattersons Corners, Ontario, Canada, to Mathew and Jane Agnew Johnston. After the American Civil War in 1865 he moved with his uncle Hugh Agnew to Rockford, Illinois. He attended the Rockford Academy and worked as a fruit picker for four years. While at Rockford he observed a murder trial which was the start of his interest in law. He then moved in 1869 to Appleton City, Missouri, where he taught school and studied law in his spare time.

He did not have any college training, instead he had an apprenticeship at a law office in Upton City, Missouri for three years.

He first married Lucy Hoisington, from Kishwaukee, Illinois, in 1871, but she died that same year. In 1872 he moved to Minneapolis, Kansas, where he was admitted to the bar.

He married political and social activist Lucy Browne 1875 in Camden, Ohio, her home town. Together they had a daughter Margaret and a son John. He supported her in her efforts to get the 1912 Kansas woman's suffrage amendment passed.

He received honorary Doctor of Laws degrees from Baker University, Kansas, in 1901 and Washburn College, Topeka in 1904.

He was a regular attendant at the First Presbyterian Church of Topeka as well as being a Mason. He was a conservative Republican, a supporter of women's rights, and a staunch Prohibitionist. He had once been a baseball player, and continued to follow the game throughout his life as his favorite sport. He was also a keen walker, believing it to be excellent metal relaxation, he was known to often have John Marshall as a companion.

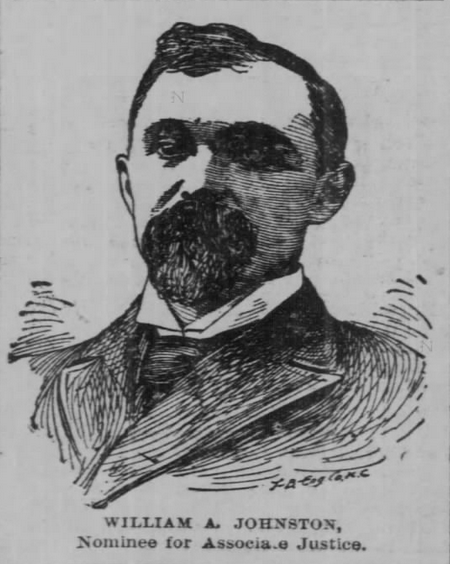
Johnston, c. 1894

== Career ==
His career started practising law in his own private law firm with R. F. Thompson in Minneapolis, Kansas, and the pair were associated until 1881.

Just three years after moving to Kansas in 1875 he was elected to the Kansas House of Representatives, and in 1876 he moved to the upper house and served as State Senator for four years. While service as a senator he was a member of five committees including judiciary, education and finance and taxation.

In 1879 he started, with R. F. Thompson and other local businessmen, the Solomon Valley Railroad Company. Also that year he joined the Rossington, Smith, and Johnston law firm, and was appointed the Assistant United States Attorney, a position he held until 1880.

In 1880 he was elected became the 11th Kansas Attorney General serving two terms from January 10, 1881, to December 1, 1884, being re-elected in 1882.

In 1884 he was elected to the Kansas Supreme Court to fill the unexpired term of David Josiah Brewer, who had moved to the United States circuit court; he actually replaced Theodore A. Hurd, who had been appointed in the interim period. In 1889 he was elected as the president of the Kansas State Bar Association. Then in 1903 became the chief justice of the court by seniority. While on the court he had participated in around twenty one thousand opinions and wrote almost three thousand opinions, mostly in favor with around 105 dissenting.

In 1935 Johnston retired before the end of his current term and was replaced by Rousseau Angelus Burch as chief justice and the spare seat on the court was filled by Hugo T. Wedell.

== Death ==
He died unexpectedly from a heart attack January 23, 1937, at his home in Topeka, Kansas, he had been dressing for the day when he collapsed and died a few minutes later. He was survived by his second wife Lucy Browne Johnston and his two children Mrs Samuel J. Brandeburg and John Johnston, both adopted. After half a century of continuous service he was known as the "Grand old man of Kansas". He was only ill twice during his service and only once did it cause him to miss court sittings.

Legal offices
Preceded by Frank Doster	Chief Justice of the Kansas Supreme Court; 1903–1935	Succeeded by Rousseau Angelus Burch
Preceded by Theodore A. Hurd	Justice of the Kansas Supreme Court; 1884–1903	Succeeded by Hugo T. Wedell
