= Bob Abbott =

American judge (1932–2010)

Justice of the Kansas Supreme Court
- In office September 1, 1990 – June 6, 2003
- Appointed by: Mike Hayden
- Preceded by: Robert H. Miller
- Succeeded by: Carol A. Beier

Judge of the Kansas Court of Appeals
- In office 1977–1990
- Appointed by: Robert Frederick Bennett
- Preceded by: Position established

Personal details
- Born: Robert Abbott; November 1, 1932; Hodgeman County, Kansas, U.S.
- Died: March 23, 2010 (aged 77); Wichita, Kansas, U.S.
- Education: Dodge City Junior College (AA); Emporia State University (BS); Washburn University (LLB); University of Virginia (LLM)

Military service
- Branch/service: United States Air Force

Bob Abbott (November 1, 1932 – March 23, 2010) was an American lawyer and jurist who served as a justice of the Kansas Supreme Court from September 1, 1990, to June 6, 2003.

== Early life and education ==
Abbott was born in Hodgeman County, Kansas. He earned an associate of arts degree from Dodge City Junior College, a Bachelor of Science from Emporia State University in 1956, and a law degree from Washburn University School of Law in 1960. He later in 1986 received a Masters in Law from the University of Virginia.

== Career ==
Abbot served in the United States Air Force, where he was a navigator on an Douglas C-124 Globemaster II. He worked as a lawyer for 17 years for a Junction City law firm. Prior to being appointed to the Kansas Supreme Court Abbott, had been the chief judge of the Kansas Court of Appeals. He had served on the Kansas Court of Appeals since its creation in 1977, and had written over 1000 court opinions.

Abbott was appointed to the Kansas Supreme Court to replace Chief Justice Robert H. Miller. Abbott retired from the court June 2003 and was replaced by Carol A. Beier.
