= Edward Ray Sloan =

American politician and judge (1883–1964)

Edward Ray Sloan (March 12, 1883 – January 30, 1964) was a member of the Kansas House of Representatives and justice of the Kansas Supreme Court from April 6, 1931, to January 9, 1933.

== Life and education ==
He was born March 12, 1883, in Seward County, Nebraska, his family then moved to Sheridan County, Kansas in 1886. He lived in a sod house until he was 17 and attended public school in Sheridan County. He obtained his degree in 1904 from Campbell College School of Law in Holton, Kansas, and Washburn College Law School in 1905. He was admitted to the bar with fifty other students in June 1905, only one of which was a woman.

He was married to Miss Julia L. Write at her home in Norton, Kansas January 24, 1906.

He was a Methodist and on occasion spoke to church groups on subject such as "Christianity and Law" and "The Trail of Christ".

== Career ==
He was elected as the Sheridan County attorney at the end of 1904 before passing the Bar, and then re-elected for a further two terms, all the time running his own private practice in Hoxie, Kansas.

He set up a new law firm July 1911 with Guy L. Hursh called the Holton law firm of Hursh & Sloan.

Sloan was appointed the Holton city attorney in April 1912 and held the position for 19 years. He gave a speech to Democrats in Topeka, Kansas Monday February 23, 1920 on "Congress Failing the Nation", which caused a number of prominent members impressed with his abilities as a statesman and an orator to urge him to run for Congress and represent them in Washington – he positively declined.

He was a member of the Kansas House of Representatives for three terms, from 1923 until 1929.

He then set up a law firm in Topeka, Kansas called Sloan, Hamilton and Sloan in 1930 with his younger brother Floyd Sloan and W. Glenn Hamilton.

When John Marshall died in March 1931 leaving his supreme court position empty neither party nominated and no one filed so the position was missed in the elections. When it was realised by the Kansas Bar Association that any qualified man who started a write-in vote campaign could take the seat the president Gilbert Frith urged member of the bar to have Justice Sloan, a Democrat, written in. So then in April 1931 Governor Woodring appointed Sloan to the Kansas Supreme Court, where he served the remaining 21 months of the unexpired term. He announced in May 1932 that he would not run for a second term stating that he would return to private practice of the end of the current term. He said that he would re-join his practice in Topeka Sloan, Hamilton and Sloan, the firm later changed to be Sloan, Listrom, Eisenbarth, Sloan & Glassman with Hamilton leaving and three new partners. The Lyon County Bar Association endorsed Sloan to run for the six week period between the election and the end of the term to stop on a technicality a once disbarred man from running for the position. It was Walter G. Thiele that did run for the next term and won the position on the court, reverting to Republican from Democrat.

He was later appointed to the Kansas Corporation Commission and was the chairman from 1936 until 1938.

Sometime later in 1947 he was appointed as the Referee in Bankruptcy for the District of Kansas, a position he help for 14 years. He was also the first vice-president of the National Association of Referees in Bankruptcy.

He lectured at the Washburn University School of Law, and then compiled a textbook on bankruptcy in 1952 called Lectures on the Law of Bankruptcy. He received an honorary doctorate of law from the Washburn University School of Law in 1954.

== Death ==
He died at home in Topeka, Kansas January 30, 1964 in his sleep.

Political offices
Preceded by John Marshall	Justice of the Kansas Supreme Court; 1931–1933	Succeeded by Walter G. Thiele
