= Abram Halstead Ellis =

American judge (1847–1902)

Justice of the Kansas Supreme Court
- In office January 15, 1901 – September 25, 1902
- Appointed by: William E. Stanley
- Preceded by: Newly Created Position
- Succeeded by: Rousseau Angelus Burch

Personal details
- Born: May 21, 1847 Cayuga County, New York
- Died: September 25, 1902 (aged 55) Topeka, Kansas

Abram Halstead Ellis (May 21, 1847 – September 25, 1902) was a justice of the Kansas Supreme Court from January 15, 1901, to September 25, 1902. He was the first justice of the Kansas Supreme Court to die while still a sitting member.

== Early life ==
Ellis was born May 21, 1847, in Cayuga, New York, to Elmer Eugene and Jane Maria (née Halstead) Ellis. He moved with his parents to Eaton County, Michigan, when he was still a child and received his education at the schools in Battle Creek.

== Civil War service ==
At age 16, Ellis enlisted in the Union Army in 1864. He served as a private in Company C, 7th Michigan Cavalry until being discharged with the regiment in 1865.

== Law career ==
Ellis was admitted to the Michigan Bar in 1872 and practiced there until 1878, when he moved to Beloit, Kansas. He continued to practice law and was active in Mitchell County politics as a Republican, serving as a delegate to the 1892 Republican National Convention in Minneapolis, which nominated President Benjamin Harrison for a second term.

When the Kansas Supreme Court was expanded by a state constitutional amendment in 1900, Ellis was appointed a justice by Governor William E. Stanley.

== Personal life ==
Ellis married Marian Josephine Prindle on May 30, 1872, in Chester, Michigan. Together they had two children: Ward (b. 1882) and Hale (b. 1890).

== Death ==
Ellis died in Topeka, Kansas, on September 25, 1902, and is buried Elmwood Cemetery in Beloit.
