= John Shaw Dawson =

American judge (1869–1960)

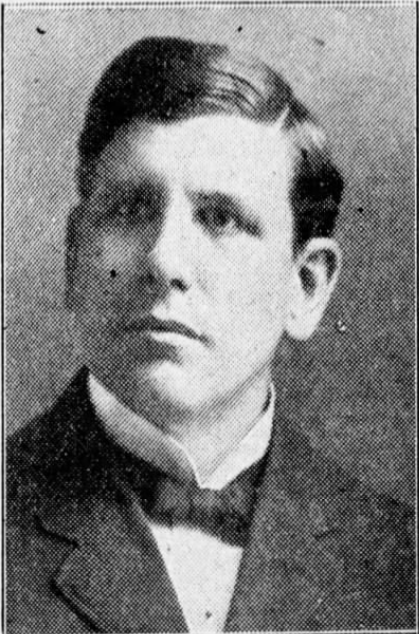
John Shaw Dawson, circa 1916

John Shaw Dawson (June 10, 1869 – February 9, 1960) was a Scottish-born Kansas attorney who served as Kansas Attorney General, and as a justice of the Kansas Supreme Court from January 11, 1915, to January 11, 1937, and chief justice from January 11, 1937, to January 8, 1945.

== Early life, education and career ==
Born at Grantown-on-Spey, Scotland, to James J. and Annie (Shaw) Dawson, his father spent the greater part of his life in railroad work in Great Britain, but in his later years followed merchandising in Scotland and was postmaster of his village. Dawson was primarily educated in the public schools, later attending the Robert Gordon's College, at Aberdeen. His father wanted him to enter the ministry, but Dawson objected and was allowed to move to Illinois, where he had relatives residing. From 1884 to 1887 he worked as a farmer in Illinois, primarily with relatives, and in March 1887 moved to Kansas. He taught country schools in Western Kansas, and during this time also attended the normal school at Salina. In 1889, he moved to Topeka, Kansas, becoming a bond clerk in the office of the state treasurer. While in Western Kansas he became principal of the Hill City schools, where the president of the school board was attorney Henry J. Harwi, who also provided Dawson's early legal training.

== Legal and judicial career ==
On March 1, 1898, Dawson gained admission to the bar at WaKeeney, Kansas. He served in the office of the state treasurer for four years, and was chief clerk in the office of the attorney general from 1903 to 1904. From 1904 to 1908 he was assistant attorney general and for six months in 1909 was private secretary to Governor Walter R. Stubbs. He resigned from this position to become an attorney for the Kansas State Railroad Commission. In 1910 he was elected Kansas Attorney General, and re-elected in 1912. During his four years of service in that office, he devoted much attention to the enforcement of alcohol prohibition laws, the anti-trust laws, and to bringing public service corporations under the control of the state government. He served as president of the National Association of Attorneys General in 1914.

In 1914, Dawson was elected to the supreme court succeeding the incumbent Alfred W. Benson. He remained on the court for thirty years, including eight years as chief justice.

== Personal life ==
On January 1, 1896, Dawson was married to Mary E. Kline, of Goshen, Kansas, with whom he had two children: Circea Ellen and Hubert Alonzo. Dawson was a Republican "with progressive tendencies", but keeping his activities "within the ranks of his party".

Dawson died at his home in Topeka, Kansas, at the age of 90.

Legal offices
Preceded by Rousseau Angelus Burch	Chief Justice of the Kansas Supreme Court; 1937–1945	Succeeded by William West Harvey
Preceded by Alfred W. Benson	Justice of the Kansas Supreme Court; 1915–1945	Succeeded by Allen Banks Burch
