= Carol A. Beier =

American judge (born 1958)

Justice of the Kansas Supreme Court
- In office September 5, 2003 – September 18, 2020
- Appointed by: Kathleen Sebelius
- Preceded by: Bob Abbott
- Succeeded by: Melissa Standridge

Personal details
- Born: September 27, 1958 (age 67) Kansas City, Kansas, U.S.
- Education: University of Kansas (BS, JD); University of Virginia School of Law

Carol Ann Beier (born September 27, 1958) is a former justice of the Kansas Supreme Court appointed by Governor Kathleen Sebelius. She took office September 5, 2003, to replace retiring Justice Bob Abbott. She retired from the court on September 18, 2020.

== Education ==
She earned a Bachelor of Science in Journalism at the University of Kansas in 1981. Beier later went on to obtain a Juris Doctor at KU in 1985 and a Master of Laws, at University of Virginia School of Law in 2004. Justice Beier currently resides in Topeka with her husband Richard W. Green.

== Legal career ==
After earning her bachelor's, Beier spent two years working for the Kansas City Times. Upon obtaining her Juris Doctor she served as a law clerk to then Judge James Kenneth Logan of the U.S. Court of Appeals for the Tenth Circuit.

She started her career as a Staff Attorney in Litigation and Legislation Practice at the National Women's Law Center through the Women's Rights and Public Policy fellowship program of the Georgetown University Law Center. After finishing the fellowship she entered private practice focusing on white collar criminal defense for Arent, Fox, Kintner, Plotkin & Kahn in Washington, D.C., from 1987 to 1988. She came back to Kansas in 1988 and practiced litigation concentrating on commercial disputes and health care law at Foulston & Siefkin L.L.P. in Wichita eventually becoming a partner at the firm.

== Judicial career ==
In 2000 Beier was appointed to the Kansas Court of Appeals where she served until being named to the Kansas Supreme Court to replace retiring Justice Bob Abbott in 2003. In 2004 she retained her seat with 702,423 (76.4%) for her and 215,948 (23.5%) opposed. In June 2020, Beier announced her retirement from the Kansas Supreme Court, effective September 18, 2020.

== Memberships ==
Beier is a member of the American Bar Association, American Judicature Society, American Bar Foundation, National Association of Women Judges, Kansas Bar Association, D.C. Bar, Kansas Women Attorneys Association, the Wichita and Topeka Bar Associations, and the Institute of Judicial Administration at New York University School of Law.

== Personal life ==
Beier was born September 27, 1958, in Kansas City, Kansas.

Legal offices
Preceded by Bob Abbott	Justice of the Kansas Supreme Court; 2003–2020	Succeeded by Melissa Standridge
