= Albert H. Horton =

American judge (1837–1902)

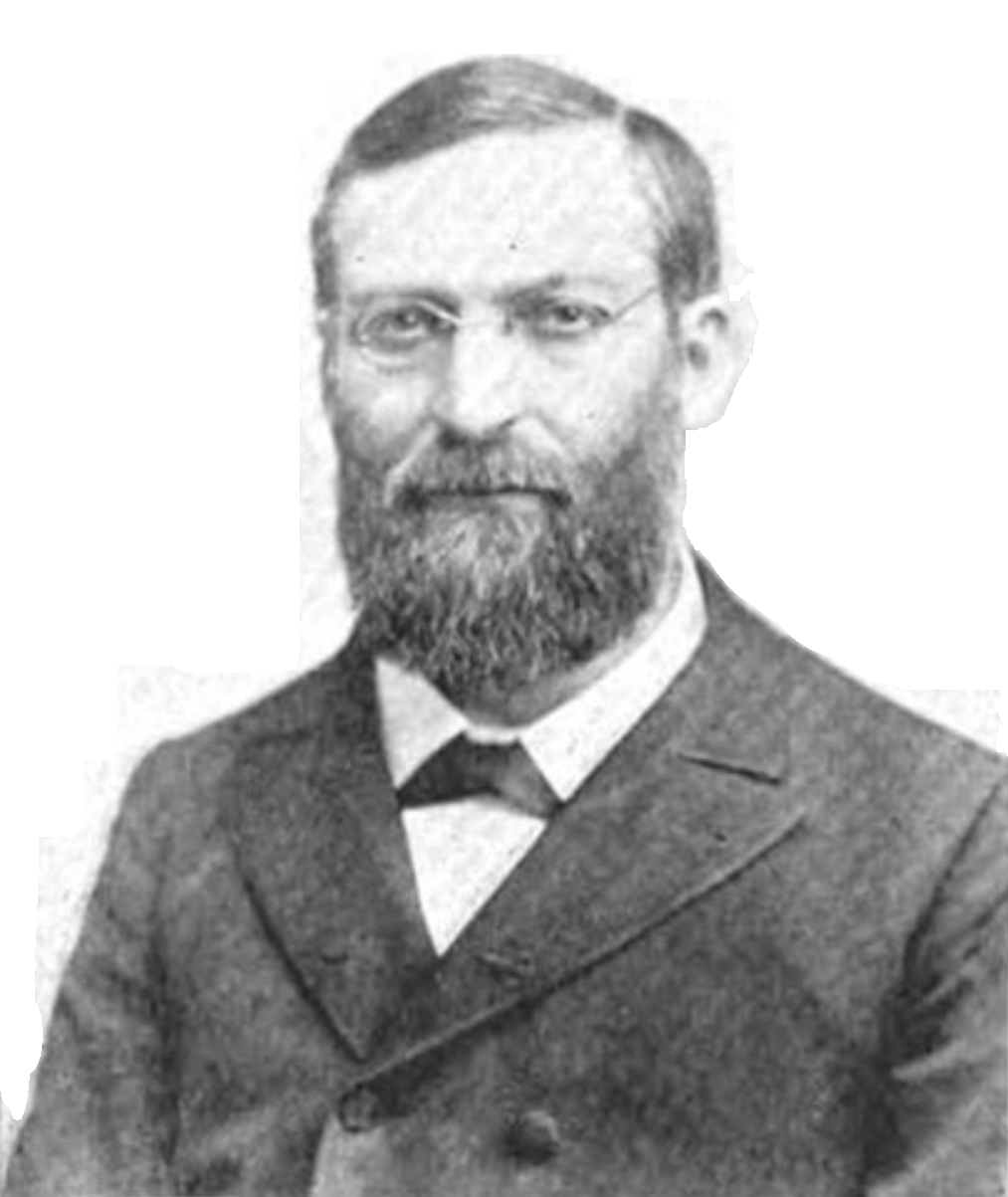
Kansas Supreme Court Justice Albert H. Horton.

Albert Howell Horton (March 12, 1837 – September 2, 1902) was chief justice of the Kansas Supreme Court from December 31, 1876 to April 30, 1895.

== Early life, education, and career ==
Born near Brookfield, New York, Horton received his elementary education in the public school and academy in Goshen, New York. He entered the law department of the University of Michigan in 1855, but during his sophomore year was compelled to leave college because of eye problems. He was admitted to the bar in Brooklyn, New York, in 1860, and the same year he moved to Atchison, Kansas, where he was soon appointed city attorney in 1860. He was elected to that office as a Republican in 1861.

== Judicial and political career ==
In September 1861, Governor Robinson appointed him judge of the Second judicial district. Later he was elected to the position twice without opposition, eventually resigning to resume his law practice. From 1861 to 1864 he was a member of the editorial staff of the Atchison Weekly Champion. In 1868 he was a Republican presidential elector and was elected as messenger to carry the vote of the state to Washington. In May, 1869, President Grant appointed him United States district attorney for Kansas. He was elected to the Kansas House of Representatives in 1872, and to the Kansas Senate in 1876, but resigned on January 1, 1877, to accept the appointment of chief justice offered by Governor Osborn. Later that year, Horton was elected to that office to fill the unexpired term. He was reelected in 1878, 1884 and 1890. In 1885 his name was presented to the joint session of the legislature for United States senator, and on the first ballot the vote stood 86 for John J. Ingalls and 83 for Judge Horton.

For many years, Horton was president of the Alumni Association of the University of Michigan, for the Southwest and in June, 1889, his alma mater conferred upon him the honorary degree of LL. D. On April 30, 1895, he resigned his position on the supreme bench to resume his law practice at Topeka, as a member of the firm of Waggener, Horton & Orr. At one point, Horton was considered for appointment to the federal bench, but ultimately did not receive such a nomination because a client in New Hampshire objected that Horton had charged an exorbitant fee for a matter.

== Personal life and death ==
In 1864 Horton married Anna A. Robertson, of Middletown, New York, who died in 1883, leaving four children, and on November 13, 1887, he married Mrs. Mary A. Prescott of Topeka.

Horton died of complications from heart disease and a tumor of the liver. He had traveled to Wisconsin with the hope of recovering there, but once his health turned for the worse, he asked to be taken back to Kansas to die in his home, in Topeka.

Political offices
Preceded by Samuel Austin Kingman	Chief Justice of the Kansas Supreme Court; 1876–1895	Succeeded by David Martin
