= Melissa Standridge =

American judge (born 1962)

Justice of the Kansas Supreme Court
- Incumbent
- Assumed office December 14, 2020
- Appointed by: Laura Kelly
- Preceded by: Carol A. Beier

Judge of the Kansas Court of Appeals
- In office February 29, 2008 – December 14, 2020
- Appointed by: Kathleen Sebelius
- Preceded by: Seat established
- Succeeded by: Jacy J. Hurst

Personal details
- Born: July 12, 1962 (age 62); Kansas City, Missouri, U.S.
- Education: University of Kansas (BS); University of Missouri, Kansas City (JD)

Melissa Taylor Standridge (born July 12, 1962) is an American lawyer who has served as a justice of the Kansas Supreme Court since 2020. She previously served as a judge of the Kansas Court of Appeals from 2008 to 2020.

== Education ==
Standridge earned her Bachelor of Science from the University of Kansas in business administration. In 1993 she earned her Juris Doctor from the University of Missouri - Kansas City School of Law.

== Career ==
Upon graduating from law school, Standridge began a two-year position with the United States District Court for the Western District of Missouri working as chambers counsel for Judge Elmo Bolton Hunter. In 1995 she joined the firm Shook, Hardy & Bacon. In 1999 she left Shook to work as chambers counsel to Magistrate Judge David Waxse.

=== Kansas Court of Appeals service ===
Standridge was appointed to the Kansas Court of Appeals by Governor Kathleen Sebelius in 2008.

=== Kansas Supreme Court service ===
On November 30, 2020, Governor Laura Kelly announced Standridge as her appointment to the Kansas Supreme Court to the seat vacated by Justice Carol A. Beier who retired on September 18, 2020. She was sworn in on December 14, 2020.

== Awards and associations ==
Standridge is involved with the Kansas Bar Association as a representative on the Board of Governors, and she is President of the Earl E. O'Connor American Inns of Court. In 2004 she received the Sandra Day O'Connor Award for Professional Service from the National American Inns of Court. In 2006 she was selected as Kansas City Legal Leader of the Year from The Daily Record, and in 2001 she earned the Outstanding Service Award from the Kansas Bar Association.

== See also ==
- List of Jewish American jurists

Legal offices
Preceded by Carol A. Beier	Justice of the Kansas Supreme Court; 2020–present	Incumbent
