= Henry F. Mason =

American judge (1860–1927)

Henry Freeman Mason (February 17, 1860 – May 4, 1927) was a Republican politician and justice of the Kansas Supreme Court from January 12, 1903 to May 4, 1927.

== Biography ==
Mason was born Henry Freeman Mason on February 17, 1860 to Lemuel and Lucy Mason in Racine, Wisconsin, United States. He graduated from the University of Wisconsin in 1881. While at Wisconsin he was a member of the Wisconsin Alpha chapter of Phi Delta Theta fraternity.

On November 26, 1891 he married Elizabeth Wilkinson, who died in 1909. He later married Lucy S. Greene on July 16, 1910. Mason died in Topeka on May 4, 1927 as a result of a tonsil infection that developed into mastoid and kidney complications.

Shortly after his death the library of the recently constructed Phi Delta Theta house at Washburn University was dedicated in his honor. In 1928, he was posthumously inducted into Washburn's prestigious Sagamore Honor Society.

== Career ==
After graduating from the University of Wisconsin, Mason worked for a newspaper in Black River Falls, Wisconsin while studying law. He began the practice of law in Kansas in 1886. From 1889 to 1893 he served as county attorney for Finney County, Kansas. Later he served in the Kansas State House of Representatives from 1899 to 1902 and was a justice of the Kansas State Supreme Court from 1903 to 1927. He was also a member of the faculty at Washburn Law School.
