= Birch (surname) =

Birch is a surname. Notable people with the surname include:

- A. A. Birch Jr. (1932–2011), American lawyer and judge
- Adam Birch (born 1979), American wrestler
- Alice Birch (born 1986), British playwright and screenwriter
- Andreas Birch (1758–1829), Danish cleric and academic
- Arthur Birch (disambiguation), several people
- Bill Birch (1934–2026), New Zealand politician
- Bob Birch (1956–2012), American musician
- Brian Birch (footballer, born 1938), played for Bolton Wanderers
- Brian Birch (1931–1989), English footballer
- Bryan Birch (born 1931), British mathematician
- Charles Birch (1918–2009), Australian geneticist, theologian and author
- Charles Bell Birch (1832–1893), English sculptor
- Charlie Birch (born 2001), English footballer
- Charlotte Birch-Pfeiffer (1800–1868), German actress and playwright
- Christian Birch-Reichenwald (1814–1891), Norwegian jurist and mayor of Oslo
- Chris Birch (stroke survivor) (born 1984), Welsh rugby player, self-described gay convert
- Chris Birch (game designer)
- Chris Birch (politician) (1950–2019), member of the Alaska Senate
- Diane Birch (born 1983), American singer-songwriter
- Daniel Birch (born 1997), Has the largest 3rd leg in the Birch family
- Edmund Birch (1831–1875), Western Australian politician
- Elizabeth Birch (born 1956), American LGBT attorney
- Eugenius Birch (1818–1884), English seaside architect
- Francis Birch (cryptographer) (1889–1956), British cryptographer and actor
- Francis Birch (geophysicist) (1903–1992), American geophysicist
- Gary Birch (footballer) (born 1981), English footballer
- Gina Birch (born 1955), English post-punk musician
- James Birch (disambiguation), several people
- Jeff Birch (1927–2005), English professional footballer
- Jim Birch (rugby union) (1889–1968), English-born rugby union player
- John Birch (disambiguation) several people
- Juno Birch (born 1993), English drag queen, sculptor, and YouTuber
- Lamorna Birch (1869–1955), English artist
- Leann Birch (1946–2019), American developmental psychologist
- Margaret Birch (1921–2020), Canadian politician
- Martin Birch (1948–2020), British music producer
- Michael Birch (disambiguation), several people
- Patricia Birch (born 1934), American choreographer, film and theatre director
- Paul Birch (disambiguation), several people
- Percy Birch (1860–?), English footballer
- Peter Birch-Reichenwald (1843–1898), Norwegian politician
- Reg Birch (1914–1994), British communist and trade unionist
- Reginald Bathurst Birch (1856–1943), English-American artist and illustrator
- Ric Birch (born 1945), Australian TV producer and event director
- Robert H. Birch (c. 1827–c. 1866), American western outlaw
- Robert L. Birch (1925–2005), American librarian and National Trivia Day creator
- Rosalie Birch (born 1983), English cricketer
- Ryan Birch (1969–2013), British judoka
- Samuel Birch (disambiguation), several people
- Sarah Birch (born 1963), American political scientist and academic
- Scholes Birch (1826–1910), English cricketer
- Sheldon Birch, American politician
- Simon Birch (racing driver) (born 2007), Danish racing driver
- Stanley F. Birch Jr. (born 1945), US Circuit Judge
- Thomas Birch (disambiguation), several people
- Thora Birch (born 1982), American actress and producer
- Wallace Birch (1910–1987), English footballer
- Walter de Gray Birch (1842–1924), English historian
- William Birch (disambiguation), several people

Fictional characters

- Edna Birch, Peter Birch and Eve Birch, from the British TV soap Emmerdale
- Professor Birch, from the Pokémon series
- Simon Birch, main character of the eponymous 1998 American comedy-drama film

== See also ==
- Burch (surname)
