= Burch (surname) =

Burch or Birch is a surname.

It is an English, Scottish, German, Danish and Swedish topographic name for someone who lived by a birch tree or in a birch wood, from an ancient Germanic word meaning ‘birch’ (Old English birce, byrce; Middle High German birche; Old Danish birk).

Notable people with the surname include:

- Allen Banks Burch (1894–1948), a justice of the Kansas Supreme Court
- Anna Mooney Burch (c. 1862–1905), American soprano
- Ashly Burch (born 1990), American actor
- Benjamin Franklin Burch (1825–1893), American politician and soldier
- Billy Burch (1900–1950), American professional ice hockey
- Cathy, Charlene and Cindy Burch, The Burch Sisters, an American country music trio
- Cecil Reginald Burch (1901–1983), British physicist and engineer
- Charles C. Burch (1928–1979), American politician
- Claire Burch (1925–2009), American author, filmmaker and poet
- Desiree Burch (born 1979), London-based American comedian
- Elizabeth Chamblee Burch, American lawyer and professor
- George E. Burch (1910–1986), American cardiologist
- J. Christopher Burch (born 1953), American venture capitalist and entrepreneur
- Jeff Burch, Canadian politician
- Jeannine Burch (born 1968), Swiss actress
- Jennings Michael Burch (1941–2013), American writer
- John Burch (1932–2006), British pianist
- John B. Burch (1929–2021), American zoologist
- John Chilton Burch (1826–1885), American politician
- John Christopher Burch (1827–1881), Secretary of the US Senate
- John E. Burch (1896–1969), American producer and director
- Jordan Burch (born 2001), American football player
- Joy Burch, Australian politician
- Laurel Burch (1945–2007), American artist, designer and businesswoman
- Lucius E. Burch Jr. (1912–1996), American lawyer
- Marc Burch (born 1984), American soccer player
- Matt Burch, computer programmer
- Michael R. Burch (born 1958), American poet
- Newton D. Burch (1871–1931), a justice of the South Dakota Supreme Court
- Noël Burch (born 1932), American film theorist
- Rob Burch (politician) (born 1942), American politician
- Ron Burch, American writer and TV producer
- Rousseau Angelus Burch (1862–1944), a justice of the Kansas Supreme Court
- Samuel Burch (1889–1974), Canadian politician
- The Burch Sisters, American country music trio
- Timmy Burch, character on the animated TV series South Park
- Tory Burch (born 1966), American fashion designer
- William P. Burch (1846–1926), American thoroughbred trainer

== See also ==
- Bishop Burch (disambiguation)
- Justice Burch (disambiguation)
- Senator Burch (disambiguation)
- Burch (disambiguation)
- Birch (disambiguation)
- Birch (surname)
