= Birchwood =

Birchwood or Birch Wood, may refer to:

- Birch wood, a type of wood of the birch tree
- birch wood, a woodland of birch trees and its wood

== Arts, entertainment, media ==
- Birchwood, 1973 novel by John Banville
- The Birch Wood (Polish: Brzezina), a 1970 Polish dramatic film
- Birch Wood (painting), a painting by Christian Rohlfs (1849–1938) at the Museum Folkwang, Essen, Germany; see List of artists in the Web Gallery of Art (L–Z)
- "Birch Woods" (song), a tune from the 2022 film The Northman off the soundtrack The Northman (soundtrack)

== People ==
- Christian Birchwood, Trinidad and Tobago politician
- Selwyn Birchwood (born 1985), American blues guitarist
- Birch Wood de Lappe (actor), father of U.S. dancer Gemze de Lappe

== Places ==
In England, UK

- Birchwood, Cheshire, a civil parish in the north-eastern part of Warrington
  - Birchwood railway station
- Birch Wood, Woodham Walter Common SSSI, Danbury, Essex
- Birchwood, Hertfordshire, a location
- Birchwood, Lincoln, Lincolnshire
- Birch Wood, Stringside, Barton Bendish, Norfolk
- Birchwood, Somerset
- Lower Birchwood and Upper Birchwood, Derbyshire
- Birch Wood, North Yorkshire; a conservancy managed by Yorkshire Wildlife Trust

In New Zealand

- Birchwood, New Zealand, a locality in the Southland Region

In the United States

- Birchwood, Alaska
- Birchwood, Michigan
- Birchwood, Cheboygan County, Michigan
- Birchwood, Tennessee
- Birchwood (Arlington, Virginia), a historic log house in Arlington County, Virginia
- Birchwood, Wisconsin, a village
- Birchwood (town), Wisconsin, a town
- Birchwood, Kewaunee County, Wisconsin, an unincorporated community
- Birchwood Village, Minnesota

== Facilities and structures ==
- Birch Wood School, Melton Mowbray, Leicestershire, England, UK; see List of schools in Leicestershire
- Birkenau Concentration Camp, referred to as "Birch Wood" in the Vrba–Wetzler report

== See also ==
- Birch Woods Park, an urban park and woodland area in Warsaw, Poland
- Birkenshaw, West Yorkshire, England, UK; (Old English: Birch Wood, grove of birch)
- Ellenabeich, Scotland, UK; (Scottish Gaelic: Eilean nam Beitheach, lit. 'Island of Birchwoods')
- Birkenes Municipality, Agder, Norway; (Norwegian: Birchwood Headland)
- Birkenwald, Germany; (German: Birchwood, lit. 'Birch Forest')
- Berkenbosch (surname; Dutch: Birchwood, lit. 'grove of birch'); see List of Dutch family names
- Brezje (disambiguation) (Slovene: Birchwood, lit. 'place of birch'), several places
- Birch (disambiguation)
- Wood (disambiguation)
