= Burch =

Burch may refer to:

== People ==
- Burch (surname)
- Burch Smith (born 1990), American baseball pitcher
- Burch., standard botanical author abbreviation of William John Burchell (1781–1863), English explorer, naturalist, traveller, artist, and author

== Places ==
=== United States ===
- Burch, Missouri, an unincorporated community
- Burch, North Carolina, an unincorporated community
- Burch, West Virginia
- Burch Creek, New York

=== Elsewhere ===
- Burch, Poland, a village
- Burch Peaks, Enderby Land, Antarctica

== Other uses ==
- Burch High School, Delbarton, West Virginia

== See also ==
- Burch v. Louisiana, a 1979 United States Supreme Court case
- Burch v Willoughby Consultants Ltd, a 1989 New Zealand breach-of-contract case
- Birch (disambiguation)
