= Joseph Birch =

Joseph Birch may refer to:

- Joe Birch (1904–1980), English footballer
- Sir Joseph Birch, 1st Baronet (1755–1833), merchant and MP for Nottingham and Ludgershall

== See also ==
- Birch (surname)
