= Birch (disambiguation) =

Birch is the common name for trees of the genus Betula.

Birch or Birchs may also refer to:

- BIRCH, a clustering algorithm
- "Birches" (poem), a poem by Robert Frost
- Birch (surname)
- The Birch, an American undergraduate journal of Eastern European and Eurasian culture
- "Birch" (song), a song by Big Red Machine featuring Taylor Swift from the album How Long Do You Think It's Gonna Last?
- "Birch", a song by Clean Bandit featuring Eliza Shaddad from New Eyes

== Places ==
Australia

- Birchs Inlet, Tasmania

United Kingdom

- Birch, Essex, England
- Birch, Greater Manchester, England

United States

- Birch, Nevada, a ghost town
- Birch, Wisconsin, a town
- Birch, Ashland County, Wisconsin, an unincorporated community
- Birch Hill, Wisconsin, a census-designated place
- Birch Township, Minnesota
- Birch Tree, Missouri
- Birch County, South Carolina, a proposed county

== Companies ==
- Birch Communications, phone company in the US

== See also ==
- Birching, a form of corporal punishment with a birch rod
- Birch Brothers, a former bus and coach operator in England
- Birchwood (disambiguation)
- Burch (disambiguation)
- The Birches (disambiguation)
- Birch Creek (disambiguation)
- John Birch Society, is an advocacy group supporting anti-communism and limited government
- White birch (disambiguation)
