= Charles Burch =

Charles Burch may refer to:

- Charles Sumner Burch (1854–1920), Episcopal bishop of New York
- Charles C. Burch (1928–1979), American politician in Tennessee
- Charlie Burch, (1919–2001), English international lawn bowler.
