= John Burch =

John Burch may refer to:

== Musicians ==
- John Burch (musician) (1932–2006), English pianist and composer
- John Burch, Bermudan guitarist for The Invaders

== Politics and military ==
- John Burch (before 1635–after 1661), English military officer and Speaker of the House of Assembly of Barbados
- John Burch (before 1808–after 1833), American member of the 56th New York State Legislature
- John Chilton Burch (1826–1885), American congressman from California and a member of the California State Legislature
- John Christopher Burch (1827–1881), Secretary of the US Senate and a member of the Tennessee State Legislature

== Others ==
- John Burch (settler) (1741–1797), early settler of Chippawa, Ontario
- John B. Burch (1929–2021), American zoologist
- John E. Burch (1896–1969), American producer and director
- John Burch (born 1966), American football player for the 1989 Phoenix Cardinals season
- John Burch, producer for a film about molecular assembler nanofactories
- John Burch, American owner of companies that built Merlin aircraft

== See also ==
- John Birch (disambiguation)
- John Burch House, part of the Quaker Hill Historic District (Waterford, Connecticut)
- Burch (surname)
