= Carroll Johnson =

American minstrel performer (c. 1851–1917)

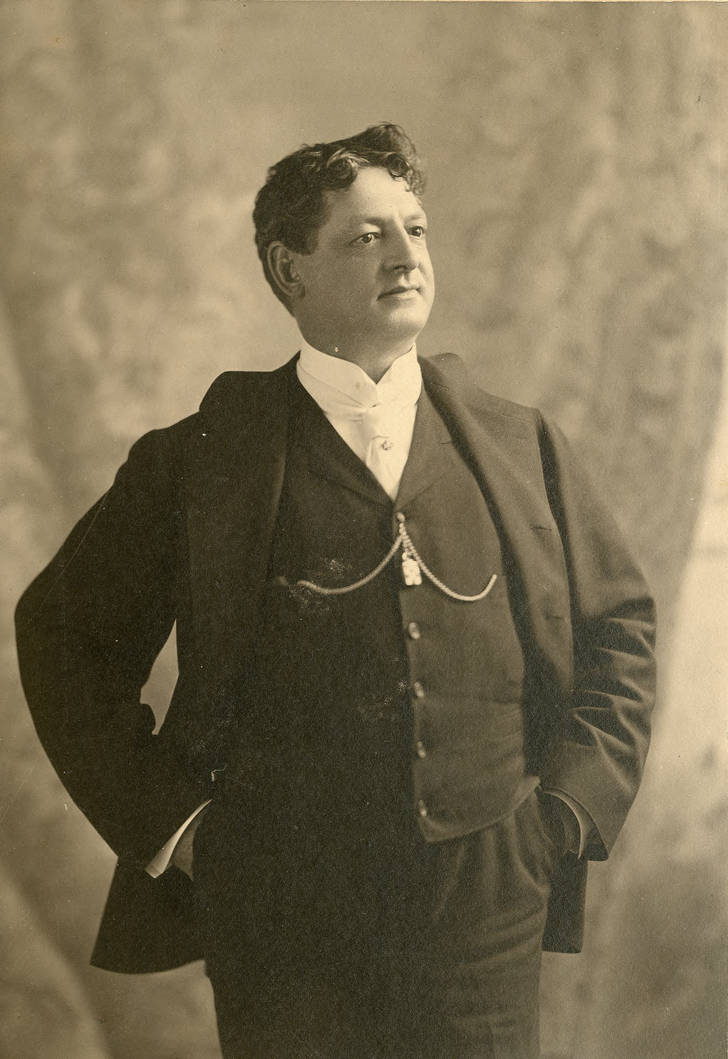

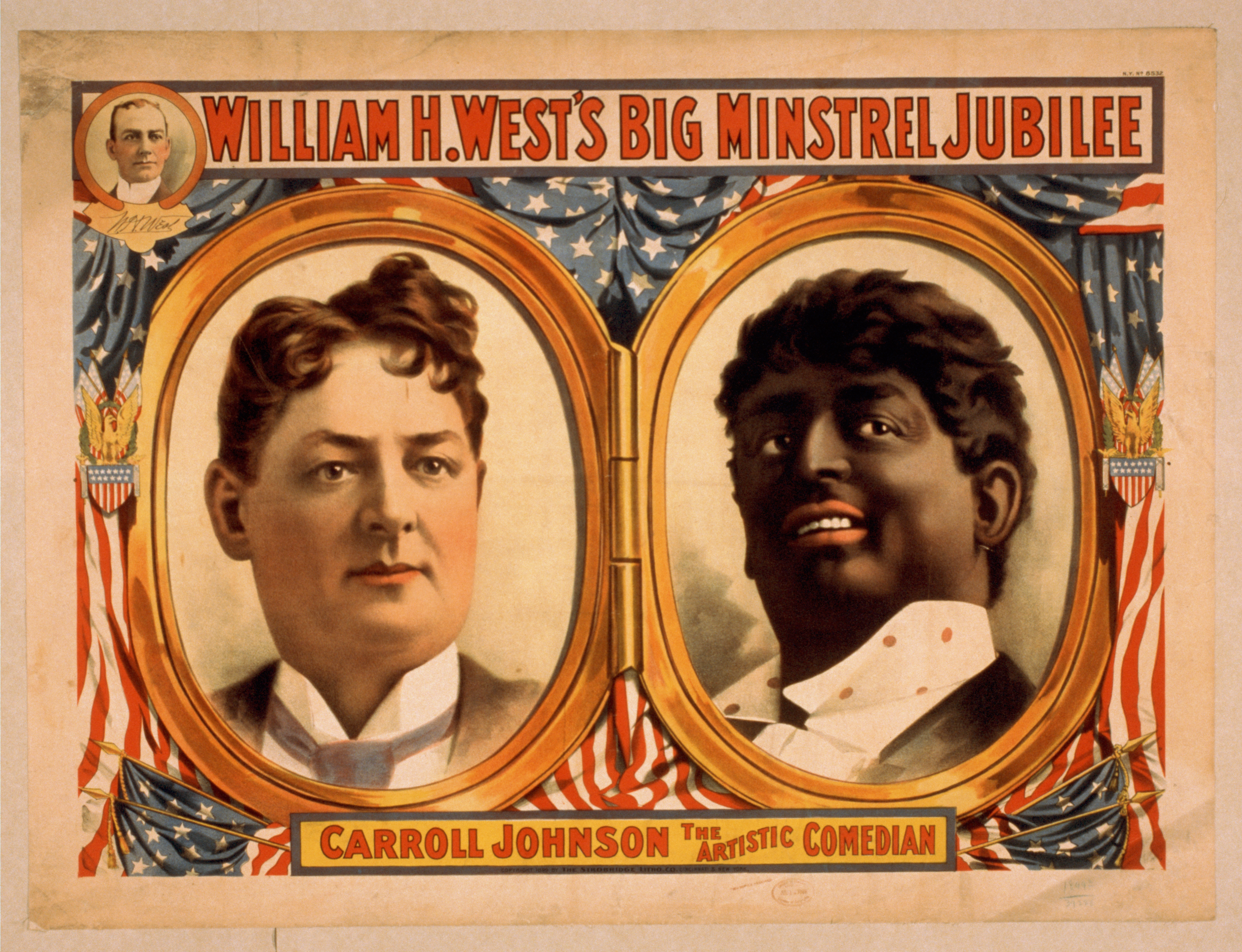

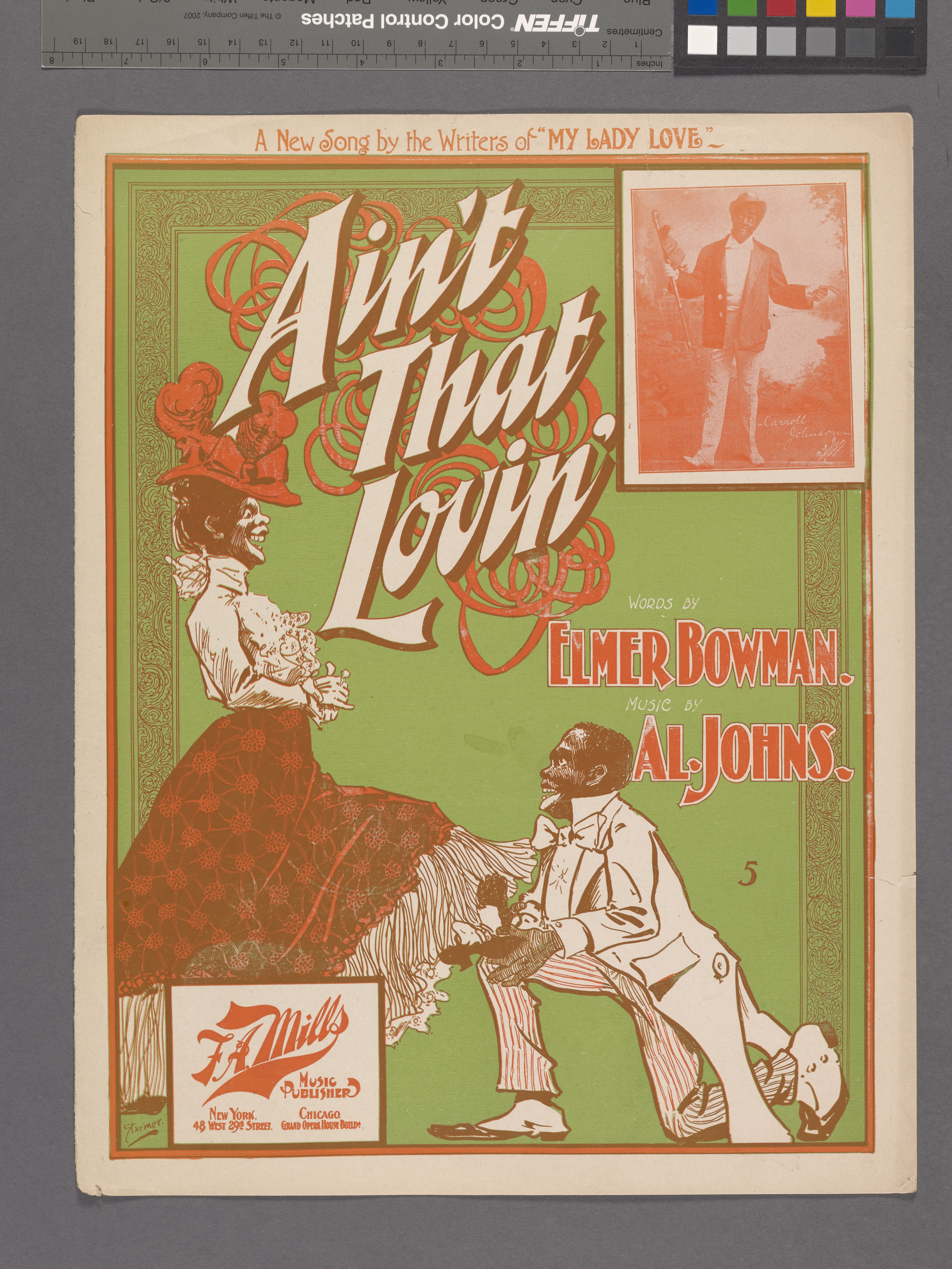

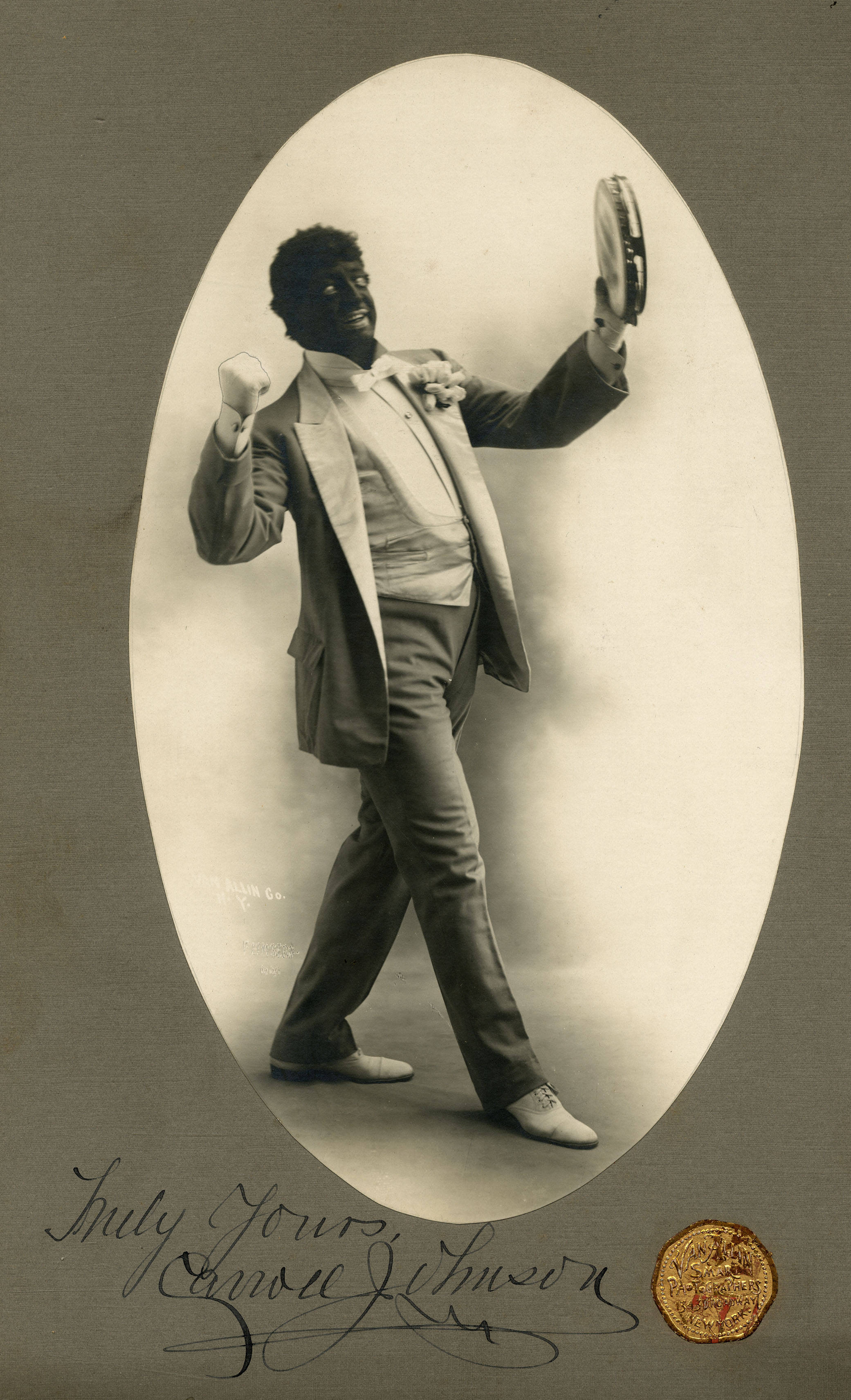

Carroll Johnson (c. 1851–1917) was a minstrel performer in the United States. In 1892, he was touted as the merry Irish minstrel for his performance of The Gossoon by E. E. Kidder at Naylor's Opera House in Terre Haute.

Between 1892 and 1894, he was the principal actor (as Osmonde O'Sullivan) in the play "The Irish Statesman", written by (John) Fitzgerald Murphy.

He appears in blackface on the cover of the sheet music for "Ma Angeline". His performances popularized the song "Parson Johnson's Chicken Brigade". Sheet music for Carroll Johnson's Songs was published.

== See also ==
- Billy Birch
