= Robert Birch =

Robert Birch may refer to:

- Robert H. Birch (c. 1827 – c. 1866), American adventurer, criminal and prospector
- Robert L. Birch (1925–2005), American librarian
- Bob Birch (Robert Wayne Birch, 1956–2012), American musician
