= James Birch =

James Birch may refer to:

- James Birch (curator) (born c. 1956), English art dealer and gallery owner
- James E. Birch (entrepreneur) (1827–1857), American stagecoach line founder
- James Birch (footballer) (1888–1940), English footballer
- James H. Birch (slave trader) (fl. 1841) American slave trader
- James W. W. Birch (1826–1875), British colonial official
- James Birch (politician) (1849–1941), Canadian merchant, horse breeder and political figure in Prince Edward Island
- Sir James Frederick Noel Birch (1865–1939), known as Noel Birch, British cavalry officer
- Jim Birch (rugby union) (1898–1968), English-born rugby union player
- James Alfred Birch (1888–1969), British philatelist
- James Birch (sectary) (died 1795?), Welsh sectary
- James Harvey Birch (1804–1878), Missouri politician and judge
