= Jonathan Birch =

Jonathan Birch may refer to:

- Jonathan Birch (snooker player) (born 1968), English snooker player
- Jonathan Birch (EIC captain) (1771/2–1848), British sea captain
- Jonathan Birch (translator) (1783–1847), English author
- Jonathan Birch (philosopher), British philosopher

== See also ==
- John Birch (disambiguation)
