= Senator Burch =

Senator Burch may refer to:

- Benjamin Franklin Burch (1825–1893), Oregon State Senate
- Eva Burch (fl. 2010s–2020s), Arizona State Senate
- I. L. Burch (1856–1939), South Dakota State Senate
- John Chilton Burch (1826–1885), California State Senate
- John Christopher Burch (1827–1881), Tennessee State Senate
- Rob Burch (politician) (born 1946), Ohio State Senate
- Thomas G. Burch (1869–1951), U.S. Senator from Virginia in 1946

== See also ==
- James Harvey Birch (1804–1878), Missouri State Senate
