= Birchwood Blue Hills Charter School =

Coordinates: 45°39′19″N 91°33′15″W

Location
- 201 East Birch Ave, Birchwood, Wisconsin 54817; Birchwood, Washburn County, Wisconsin; United States

Information
- Funding type: Public
- Established: 2008
- Principal: Jeff Stanley
- Grades: 7 through 12
- Colors: Maroon and white
- Song: Minnesota Rouser
- Mascot: Bobcats
- Website: www.birchwoodcharterschools.com/bbhcs.html

Birchwood Blue Hills Charter School (BBHCS) was a small charter school in the village of Birchwood, Wisconsin (population 402, as of the 2020 census).

Founded in 2008, the BBHCS started out with nine students. It focused on project-based learning, with student-led projects instead of lectures and classes. The BBHCS had a low student-adviser ratio of approximately 15:1. It served grades 7 through 12.

== Demographics ==
The demographic makeup was 85.7% white, 14.3% Native American. 57.1% of students were male, while 42.9% were female.

== Disbanding ==
BBHCS was disbanded at the end of the 2022-2023 school year and was replaced with the Birchwood STEAM and Career Academy (BSCA), a charter school focusing on project-based and career-based learning. It serves grades 6 through 12.
