= East Krok, Wisconsin =

- Unincorporated community
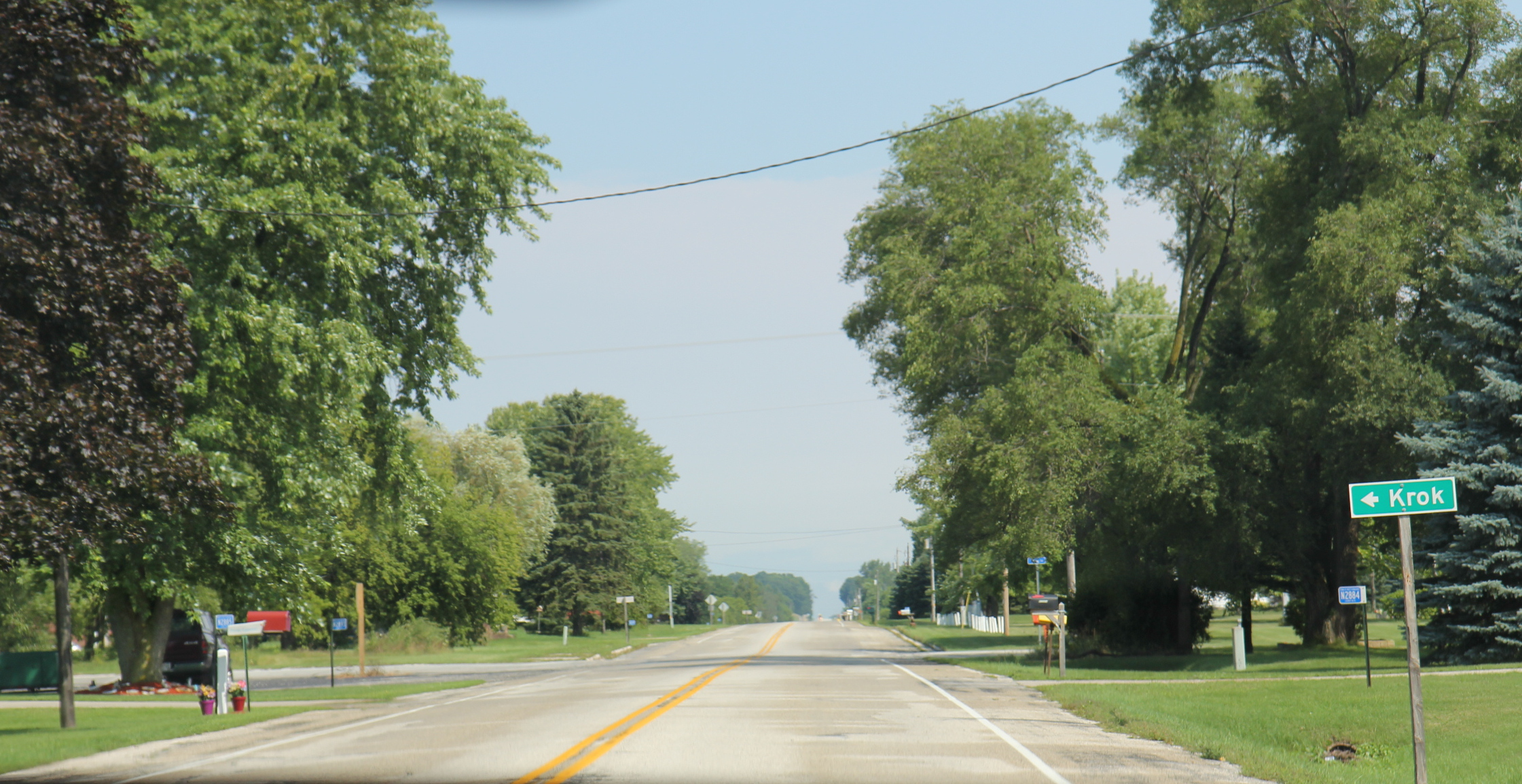
- Looking east in East Krok

- Location within Wisconsin Location within the United States
- Coordinates: 44°25′44″N 87°36′08″W
- Country: United States
- State: Wisconsin
- County: Kewaunee
- Town: West Kewaunee
- Elevation: 728 ft (222 m)
- Time zone: UTC-6 (Central (CST))
  - Summer (DST): UTC-5 (CDT)
- Area code: 920
- GNIS feature ID: 1564340

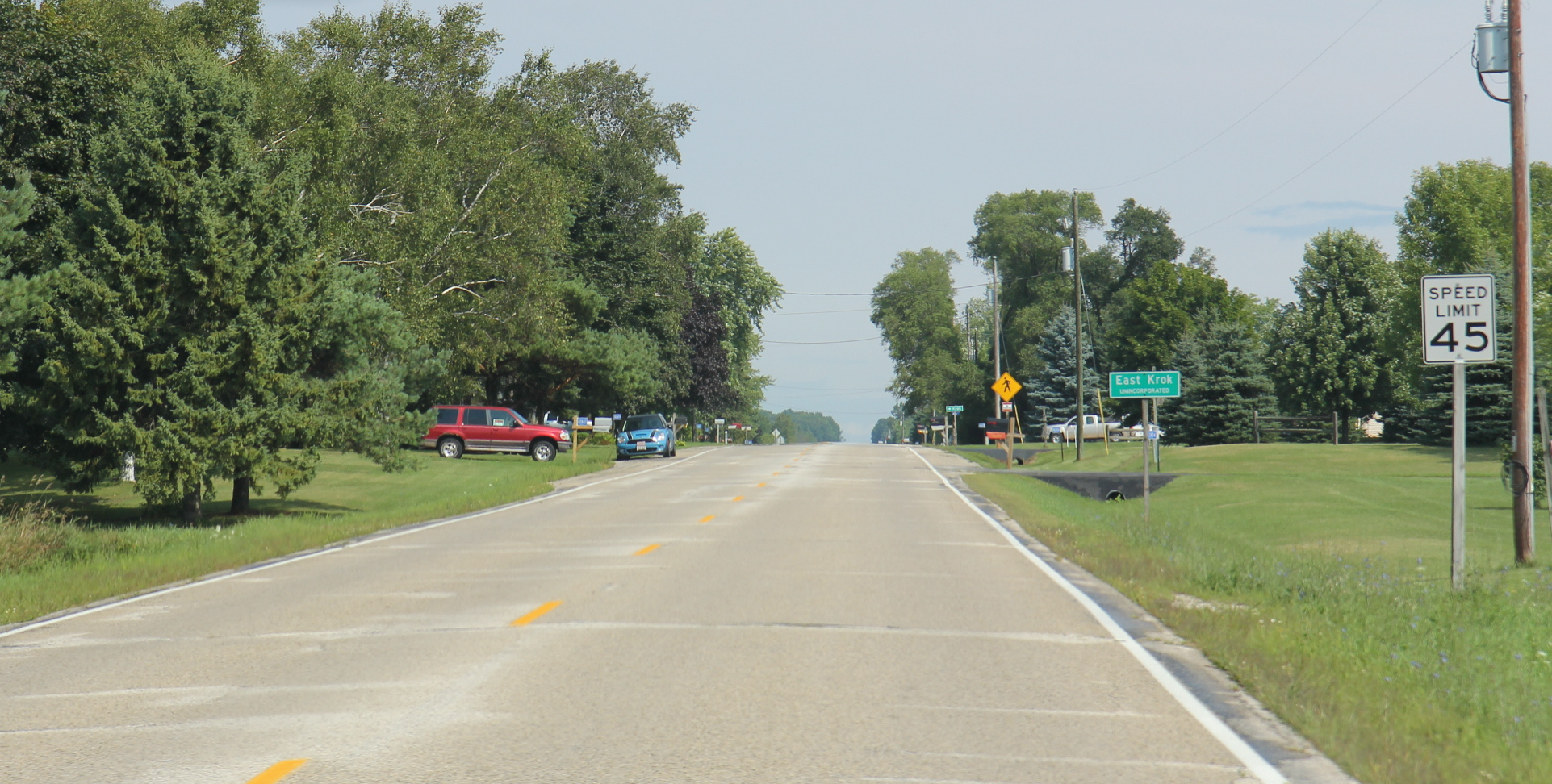
Looking east at the sign for East Krok

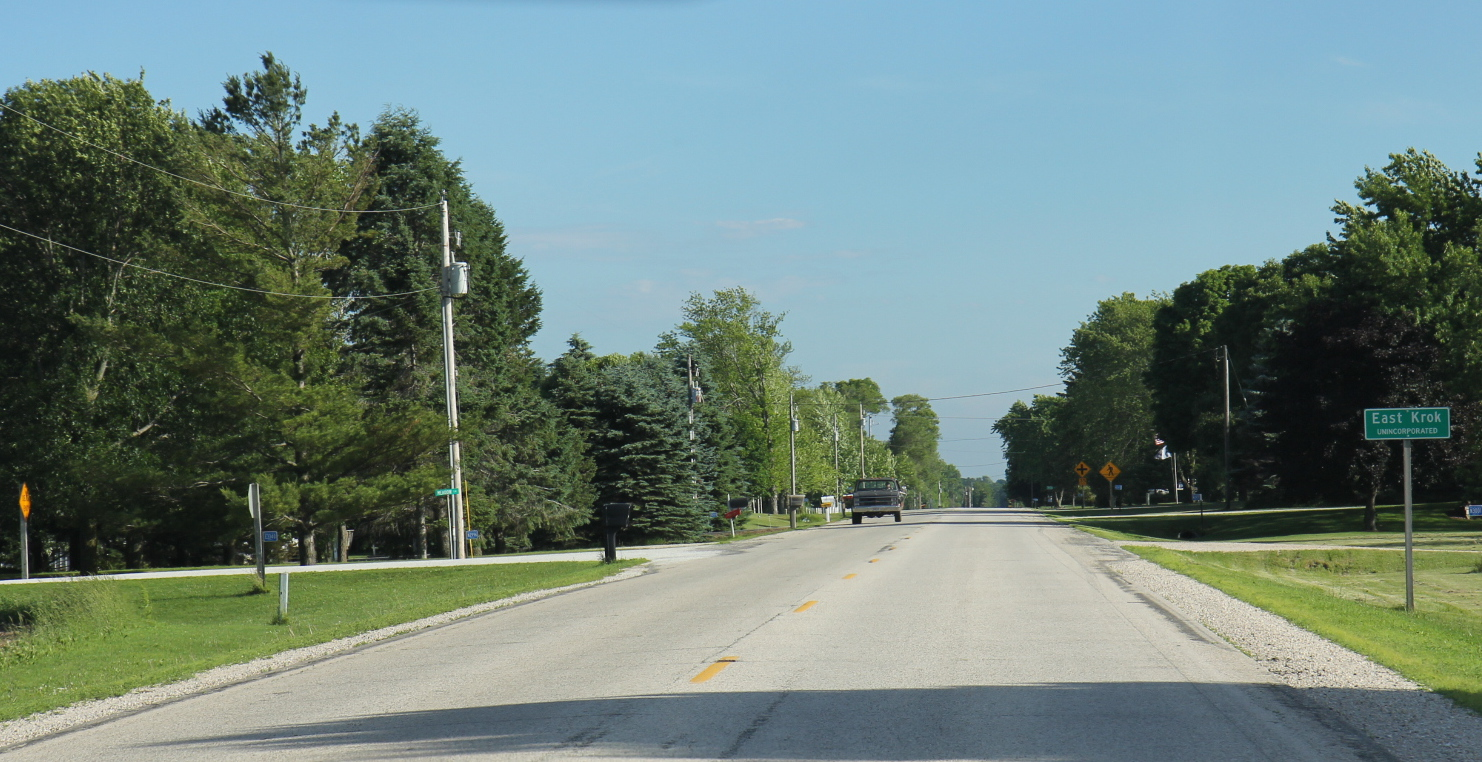
Looking south in East Krok

East Krok is an unincorporated community in the town of West Kewaunee in Kewaunee County, Wisconsin, United States. Unincorporated Krok is located just west of East Krok and can be accessed via Krok Road.
