= West Kewaunee, Wisconsin =

- Town
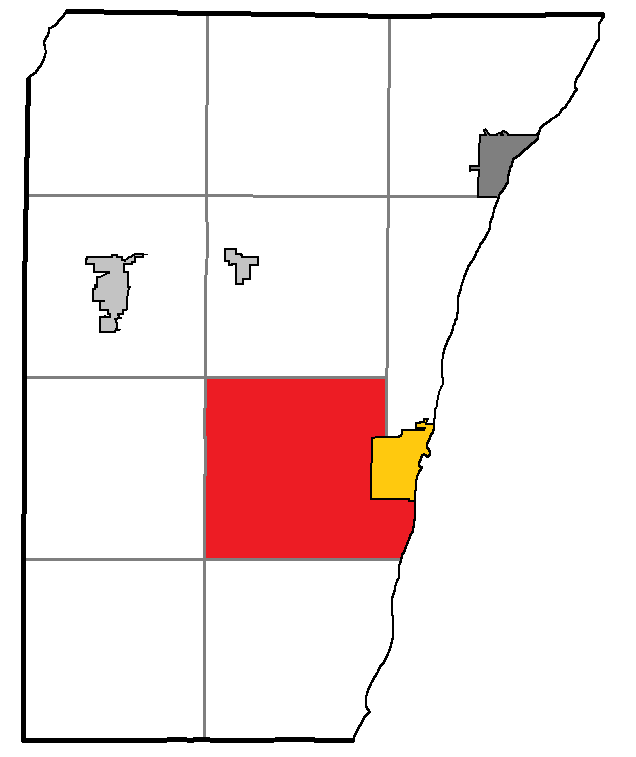
- Location of West Kewaunee, within Kewaunee County
- Coordinates: 44°27′3″N 87°33′46″W
- Country: United States
- State: Wisconsin
- County: Kewaunee

Area
  - Total: 36.98 sq mi (95.78 km^{2})
  - Land: 36.88 sq mi (95.51 km^{2})
  - Water: 0.10 sq mi (0.27 km^{2})
- Elevation: 761 ft (232 m)

Population (2020)
  - Total: 1,278
  - Density: 34.66/sq mi (13.38/km^{2})
- Time zone: UTC-6 (Central (CST))
  - Summer (DST): UTC-5 (CDT)
- Area code: 920
- FIPS code: 55-85775
- GNIS feature ID: 1584408
- Website: https://www.townofwestkewaunee.com/

West Kewaunee is a town in Kewaunee County, Wisconsin, United States. The population was 1,278 at the 2020 census. The unincorporated communities of Birchwood, East Krok, and Krok are located in the town.

== Geography ==
West Kewaunee is bordered to the east by the city of Kewaunee and to the southeast by Lake Michigan. According to the United States Census Bureau, the town has a total area of 37.0 square miles (95.8 km^{2}), of which 36.9 square miles (95.5 km^{2}) are land and 0.1 square miles (0.3 km^{2}), or 0.28%, are water.

== Demographics ==
As of the census of 2000, there were 1,287 people, 460 households, and 352 families residing in the town. The population density was 34.9 people per square mile (13.5/km^{2}). There were 485 housing units at an average density of 13.1 per square mile (5.1/km^{2}). The racial makeup of the town was 97.82% White, 0.31% African American, 0.16% Native American, 0.47% Asian, 0.39% from other races, and 0.85% from two or more races. Hispanic or Latino of any race were 0.85% of the population.

There were 460 households, out of which 36.1% had children under the age of 18 living with them, 67.8% were married couples living together, 4.8% had a female householder with no husband present, and 23.3% were non-families. 19.1% of all households were made up of individuals, and 8.3% had someone living alone who was 65 years of age or older. The average household size was 2.80 and the average family size was 3.24.

In the town, the population was spread out, with 26.6% under the age of 18, 8.4% from 18 to 24, 29.0% from 25 to 44, 24.2% from 45 to 64, and 11.9% who were 65 years of age or older. The median age was 37 years. For every 100 females, there were 106.6 males. For every 100 females age 18 and over, there were 109.1 males.

The median income for a household in the town was $47,059, and the median income for a family was $49,196. Males had a median income of $32,411 versus $23,527 for females. The per capita income for the town was $17,621. About 3.8% of families and 6.1% of the population were below the poverty line, including 8.7% of those under age 18 and 8.8% of those age 65 or over.
