= The Birches =

The Birches may refer to:

- The Birches, County Armagh, a settlement in Northern Ireland
- The Birches (Belgrade Lakes, Maine), a house listed on the U.S. National Register of Historic Places (NRHP)
- The Birches (Garrison, New York), a.k.a. The Birches Philipstown, New York, a house designed by Ralph Adams Cram and listed on the NRHP

== See also ==
- Birch (disambiguation)
