= William Birch =

William Birch, Bill Birch or Billy Birch may refer to:

- Bill Birch (1934–2026), New Zealand politician
- Bill Birch (footballer) (born 1944), English and Australian footballer and coach
- Billy Birch (1831–1897), American minstrel performer
- William Birch (Australian cricketer) (1849–1897), Australian cricketer
- William Birch (English cricketer) (1863–1940), English cricketer
- William Birch (footballer) (1887–1968), English footballer
- William Birch (painter) (1755–1834), English and US miniature painter, enameler and engraver
- William Birch (settler) (1842–1920), English settler in North Island, New Zealand
- William Fred Birch (1870–1946), American politician
- William John Birch (1811–1891), English freethinker
