= Danbury Ridge Nature Reserves =

Nature reserves in Essex, England

Coordinates: 51.7246°N 0.5895°E

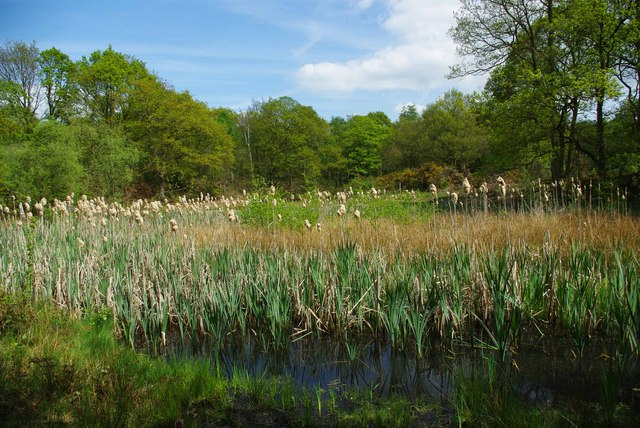
Backwarden Pond

Danbury Ridge Nature Reserves are a group of nature reserves totalling 101 hectares near Danbury in Essex, England. They are managed by the Essex Wildlife Trust, and most of them are in Sites of Special Scientific Interest (SSSIs). Two areas, the Backwarden and Hitchcock's Meadow, are part of Danbury Common SSSI, and Woodham Walter Common, Birch Wood, Pheasanthouse Wood, Poors Piece, Scrubs Wood, and a small area in Pheasanthouse Farm, are part of Woodham Walter Common SSSI.

Woodham Walter Common is woodland on gravel upland sloping down to streams on both sides. Birch Wood is hornbeam coppice, with ground flora including wood anemones and wood spurges. Pheasanthouse Wood is mixed woodland, with a bog area which has sphagnum moss. In Poors Piece there are oak pollards and a marsh area. Scrubs Wood is mainly hornbeam and chestnut coppice, while Backwarden, which is owned by the National Trust, has varied habitats including a pond, woodland and heathland. Hitchcock's Meadow also has diverse habitats such as flower-rich ancient pasture, woodland and marsh. Dormice are common in the reserves.

There is access to Woodham Walter Common from Common Lane.
