= A Poor Relation =

1921 film

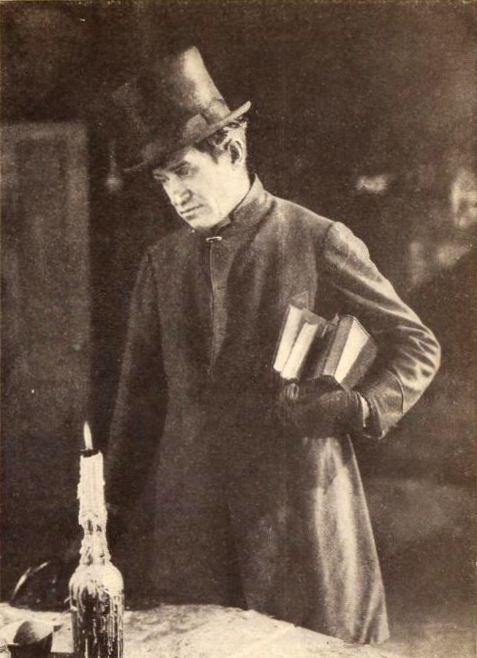
- Will Rogers in A Poor Relation
- Directed by: Clarence G. Badger
- Screenplay by: Bernard McConville
- Based on: A Poor Relation by Edward E. Kidder
- Starring: Will Rogers; Sylvia Breamer; Wallace MacDonald; Sidney Ainsworth; George B. Williams; Molly Malone
- Cinematography: Marcel Le Picard
- Production company: Goldwyn Pictures
- Distributed by: Goldwyn Pictures
- Release date: December 1921
- Running time: 50 minutes
- Country: United States
- Language: Silent (English intertitles)

A Poor Relation is a 1921 American silent comedy film directed by Clarence G. Badger and written by Bernard McConville. It is based on the play A Poor Relation by Edward E. Kidder. The film stars Will Rogers, Sylvia Breamer, Wallace MacDonald, Sidney Ainsworth, George B. Williams, and Molly Malone. The film was released in December 1921, by Goldwyn Pictures.

== Plot ==
As described in a film magazine, shabby and lovable old inventor Noah Vale shares his attic room with Rip and Patch, two orphans he has befriended. His lifetime ambition is centered in an invention he has slaved to perfect. In the meantime he tries to keep Rip, Patch, and himself from starving by selling copies of The Decline and Fall of Rome door to door. He is dispossessed and Scallops, a neighbor's child, gives them shelter. Vale has a distant relative, a wealthy manufacturer by the name of Fay, and when he writes him for aid in putting the invention to market, Fay's daughter takes a deep interest in the case. Fay's partner Sterrett tries to steal a model of the invention, but returns it when he finds that it is worthless. Johnny Smith, secretary to Fay, is discharged but secures work at a newspaper, and gets a position for Vale as a column writer. Vale gives up inventing and when Johnny marries Miss Fay, they provide a home for Rip and Patch.

== Cast ==
- Will Rogers as Noah Vale
- Sylvia Breamer as Miss Fay
- Wallace MacDonald as Johnny Smith
- Sidney Ainsworth as Sterrett
- George B. Williams as Mr. Fay
- Molly Malone as Scallops
- Robert DeVilbiss as Rip
- Jeanette Trebaol as Patch
- Walter Perry as O'Halley
