= Krok, Wisconsin =

- Unincorporated community
- Location within Wisconsin Location within the United States
- Coordinates: 44°25′44″N 87°37′59″W
- Country: United States
- State: Wisconsin
- County: Kewaunee
- Town: West Kewaunee
- Elevation: 728 ft (222 m)
- Time zone: UTC-6 (Central (CST))
  - Summer (DST): UTC-5 (CDT)
- Area code: 920
- GNIS feature ID: 1577686

Krok is an unincorporated community in the town of West Kewaunee in Kewaunee County, Wisconsin, United States. Krok is situated near the origin of the East Twin River and its tributary, Krok Creek, just west of East Krok. The community was founded by Czech immigrants from Bohemia, now in the Czech Republic. The Krok post office was established by Wojta Stransky in January 1875.
