= Stiles H. Bronson =

American politician

Member of the South Dakota Senate from the 17th district
- In office 1889–1890
- Preceded by: none
- Succeeded by: I. L. Burch

Personal details
- Born: September 15, 1842 Chenango County, New York
- Died: September 20, 1930 (aged 88) Fall River County, South Dakota
- Party: Populist
- Spouse: Aner Perrin
- Children: four
- Profession: editor

Spencer H. "Stiles" Bronson (September 15, 1842 – September 20, 1930) was an American politician. He served in the South Dakota State Senate from 1889 to 1890.
