= Danbury Common =

Area of heathland in Essex, England

Coordinates: 51.7124°N 0.5729°E

- Site of Special Scientific Interest
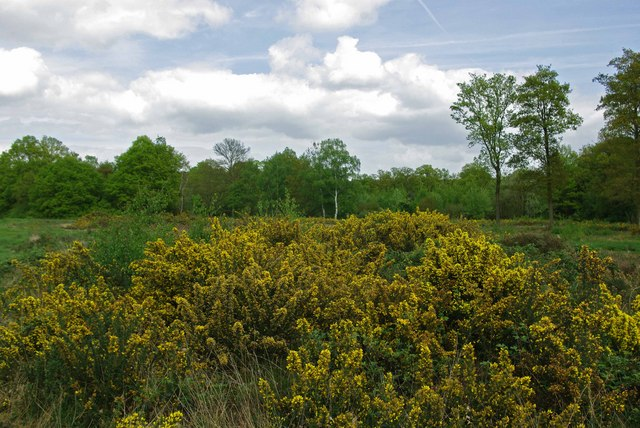
- Location of Danbury Common.
- Area of search: Essex
- Grid reference: TL782043
- Interest: Biological
- Area: 70.2 ha (173 acres)
- Notification date: 1986
- Location map: Magic Map

Danbury Common is a 70.2-hectare (173-acre) biological Site of Special Scientific Interest in Danbury in Essex, England. Most of it is common land owned by the National Trust, and two areas, the Backwarden and Hitchcock's Meadows, are part of Essex Wildlife Trust's Danbury Ridge Nature Reserves.

The site is one of the largest areas of heathland left in the county, and also has bracken and gorse scrub, and woodland with oak and birch. Upper parts are on glacial gravel, and lower down there are boggy heath and woodland areas. Woodland ground flora includes bluebells and anemones. Meadows have uncommon species such as meadow saxifrage and hoary cinquefoil. The common is the main British site for the rosy marbled moth, and there are several ponds.
