= Edward E. Kidder =

Playwright

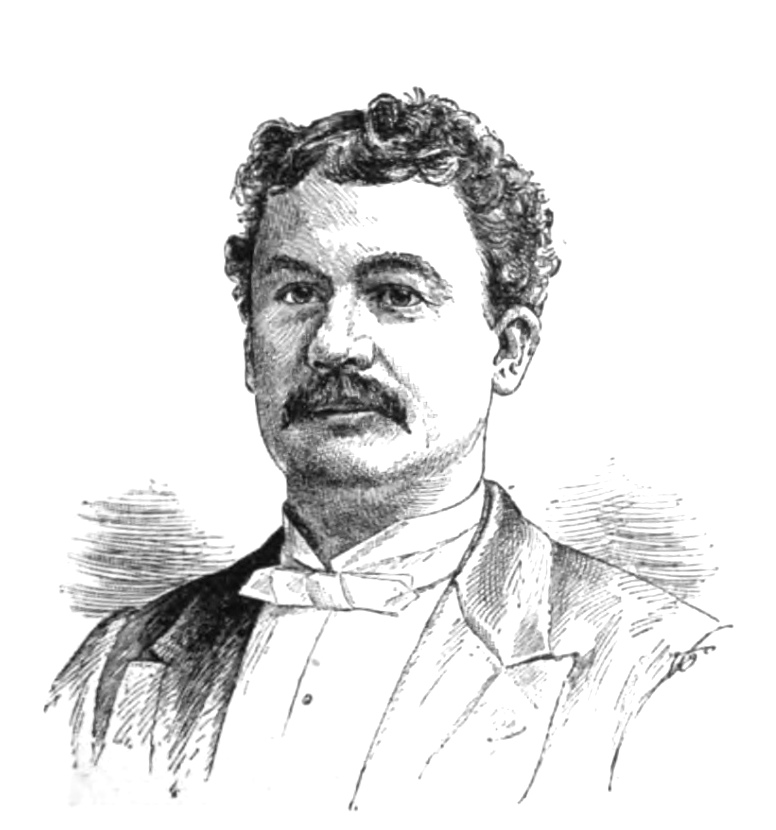

Edward E. Kidder (1846 or 1847 - 1927) was a playwright in the United States. Several of Kidder's works were adapted to film, including A Poor Relation in 1921.

He was married to Augusta Raymond Kidder (died 1939). The New York Public Library has a collection of his scripts. He wrote about two dozen Broadway shows and toured.

He was born in Charlestown, Massachusetts.

Samuel French advertised plays by various playwrights including Kidder.

== Works ==
- Three of a Kind
- Sky Farm
- Jolly American Tramp
- Shannon of the 6th
- Peaceful Valley
- A College Cinderella
- All By His Lonesome
- The Bridge Party

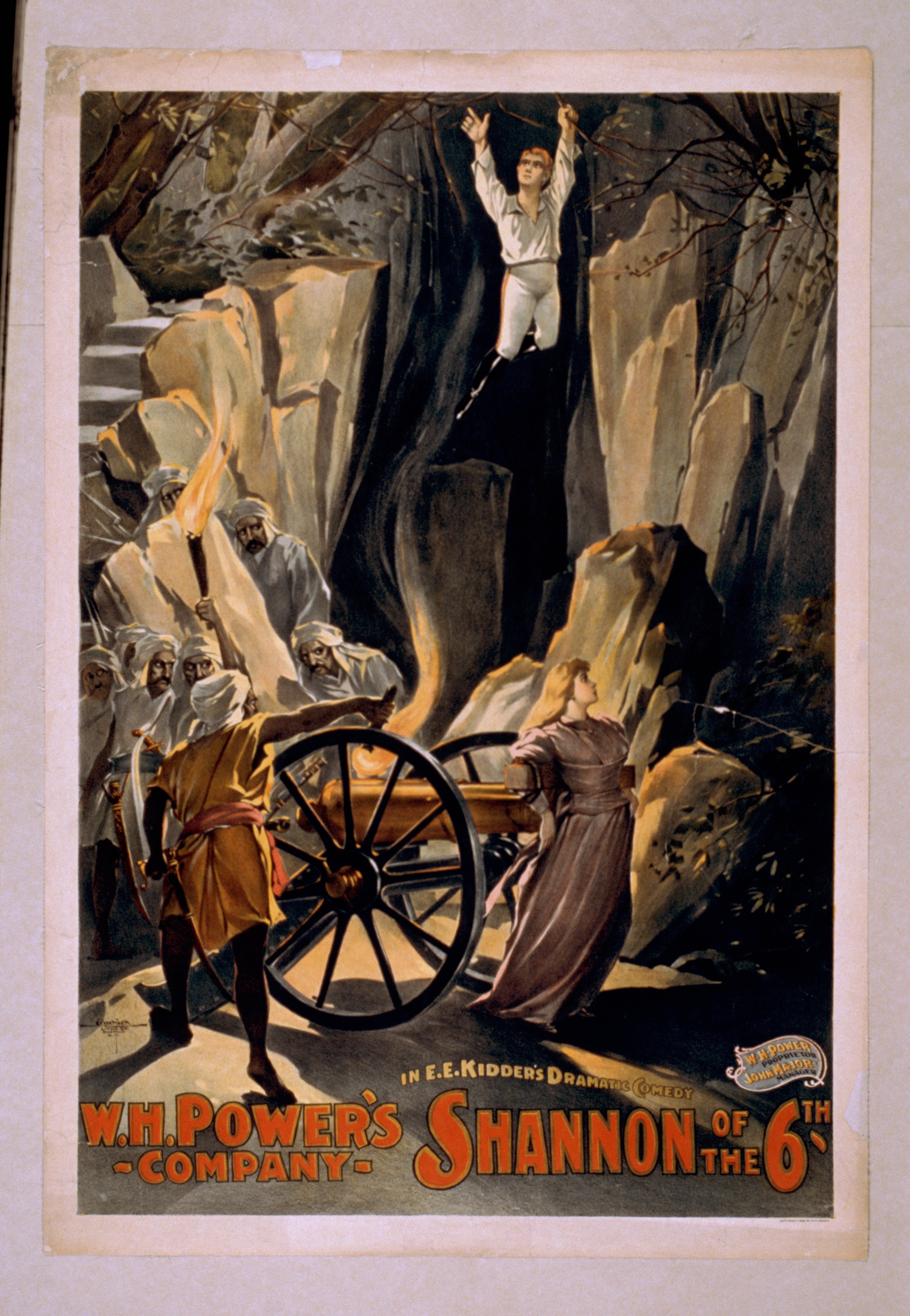
Lithograph print advertisement for Shannon of the 6th

- Stage Struck
- The Bungalow Bride
- A Run For Her Money
- A Lively Legacy
- The Moon Child
- Easy Dawson
- The Devil's Diamond
- A Poor Relation
- An Ocean Pearl

== Filmography ==
- Shannon of the Sixth (1914)
- Peaceful Valley (1920)
- A Poor Relation (1921)

== See also ==
- Carroll Johnson
- Lillian Lee
