= Woodham Walter Common SSSI =

Natural Wildlife Reserves for Scientific Interest

Coordinates: 51.7246°N 0.5895°E

Woodham Walter Common
- Site of Special Scientific Interest
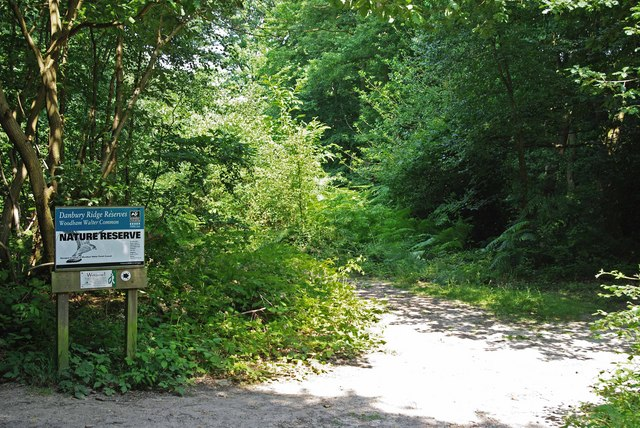
- Location of Woodham Walter Common.
- Area of search: Essex
- Grid reference: TL791065
- Interest: Biological
- Area: 80.0 ha (198 acres)
- Notification date: 1986
- Location map: Magic Map

Woodham Walter Common SSSI is an 80-hectare (200-acre) biological Site of Special Scientific Interest (SSSI) in Danbury in Essex. The site includes six nature reserves within the Danbury Ridge Nature Reserves, managed by the Essex Wildlife Trust. These are Woodham Walter Common itself, Birch Wood, Pheasanthouse Wood, Poors' Piece, Scrubs Wood and a small area in Pheasanthouse Farm. The largest part of the SSSI is the 32.3-hectare (80-acre) Woodham Walter Common, which is managed by the Wildlife Trust on behalf of Maldon District Council and Woodham Walter Parish Council.

The site is on glacial sand and gravel over London clay. it has a number of areas of oak and hornbeam woodland on former heathland. It also has two botanically rich valleys, each of which has a stream along it. Poors' Piece and Pheasanthouse Wood have ancient woodland. Uncommon ground plants are pill sedge, broad-leaved helleborine and lady-fern. There are common brimstone and speckled wood butterflies, nightingales, hawfinches, badgers. and dormice.

There is access to Woodham Walter Common from Common Lane.
