= Birchwood (Arlington, Virginia) =

Historic log house in Arlington County, Virginia

Coordinates: 38.906275°N 77.122225°W

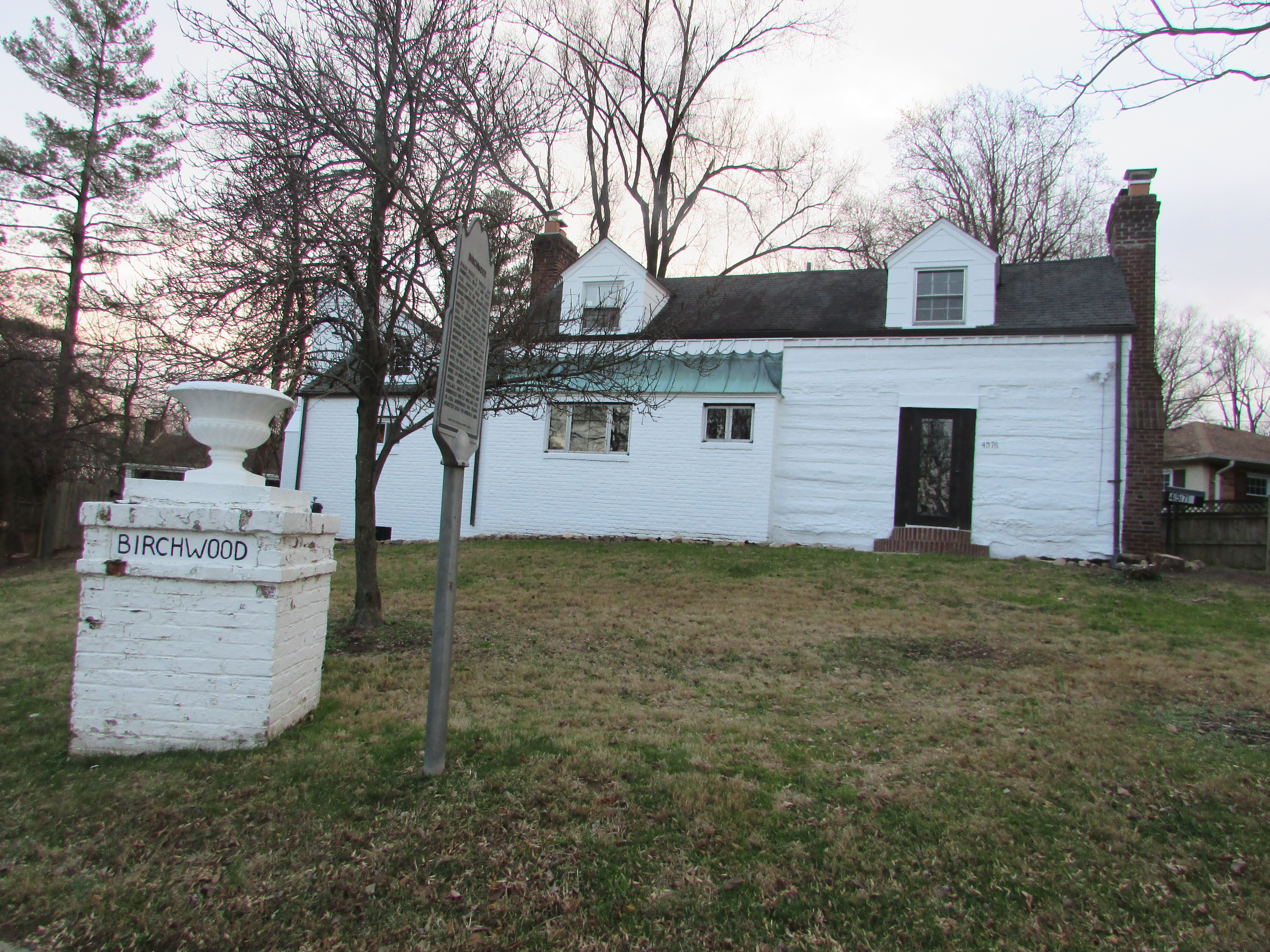
Birchwood in 2018

Birchwood is a log house reconstructed in 1936 using logs from an earlier structure built in about 1836. It is located in Arlington County, Virginia. The first log house on the site was an even earlier structure built by Caleb Birch in approximately 1810 that burned down.

Richard Wallace, valet to Rear Admiral Presley M. Rixey, lived here, and received President Theodore Roosevelt as a visitor.

The house is recognized by Arlington County as a historic site and has installed a historic marker at the house.
