= Claire Burch =

American author, filmmaker and poet

- Born: Brooklyn, New York

Claire Burch (1925 in Brooklyn, New York – May 21, 2009) was an American author, filmmaker and poet.

== History ==
After attending grade school in Brooklyn, Burch completed a commercial art course at Washington Irving High School in Manhattan and received her B.A. in English from NYU. In the suburbs of Great Neck, New York, she first began writing poetry and articles which were published in Life magazine, The New Republic, Mademoiselle, McCall's, Saturday Review, Redbook, Good Housekeeping, and numerous literary quarterlies and anthologies. Burch also developed a career as a psychiatric writer, publishing two books on the subject: Careers in Psychiatry and Stranger in the Family.

In the early 1970s Burch became a playwright and painter. Her play Ten Cents a Dance was optioned to be directed by José Quintero, the famous O'Neill interpreter. Burch wrote a total of seven plays and several folk operas, but eventually moved on to filmmaking and video anthropology—she was an early adapter of video as a medium.

In 1978, Burch moved to California with her longtime companion Mark Weiman, publisher and owner of Berkeley's Regent Press. She had endured a series of illnesses and wanted to escape the harsh climate of Manhattan.

Burch gained insight and inspiration from insanity and the often unexpected behavior associated with it. She would often videotape homeless people in People's Park and Telegraph Avenue in Berkeley, which were collected in her film People's Park in Berkeley: Then and Now. The film documented the dispute between homeless activists and the University of California from the riots of 1969 through 1996 by interviewing park "regulars," and profiling the events surrounding the deaths of park supporters James Rector and Rosebud Denovo.

She also produced documentaries on noted cultural figures such as James Baldwin (whom she knew as a teenager), Timothy Leary and Country Joe McDonald. Also of note was Oracle Rising, a film about the legendary psychedelic newspaper The SF Oracle published in the Haight-Ashbury district during the Summer of Love. Her last completed film was Elegy for the Naked Guy, about the life and death of Andrew Martinez, a well-known figure on the Berkeley campus in the mid-'90s who died in prison in 2007.

Late in life Burch suffered a stroke which took most of her vision, but she was able to retain enough sight to frame her subjects. She died before completing her final project, Gimme an 'F', a documentary on Country Joe McDonald and the song that helped end the Vietnam War, the "Fuck Cheer" from Woodstock, and the "Fixin' to Die Rag." The film is estimated to be 70% complete.

== Family ==
At 18, Burch married a soldier and the couple raised three children in Great Neck and Greenwich Village. When her husband Brad died in 1967, she and her kids moved full-time to the West Village. Burch's interest in psychiatry bloomed after she adopted a child who was diagnosed with schizophrenia.

== Drug use ==
Burch underwent a traditional four-times-weekly Freudian analysis before switching to marijuana and LSD in the early 1970s. She was a recreational marijuana user throughout her life.

== Death ==
Burch died at the age of 84. She left behind a vast archive in almost every media--visual art (painting and drawing); writing (a dozen published books and thousands of pages of unpublished manuscripts); music (thousands of hours of reel-to-reel, cassette tapes of her original music and hundreds of songs); and a huge library of both edited and unedited film and video, representing her habit of recording about an hour of reality every day for the past 36 years. This last project creates an archival nightmare, as there is not enough time to view it all. Burch was fond of referring to the Collyer Brothers, a pair of New Yorkers who suffered from a fear of throwing anything away and filled their apartment from top to bottom. She would often mockingly refer to her own archival efforts in the same vein.

== Bibliography ==
- Careers in psychiatry (1968)
- Stranger in the family: A guide to living with the emotionally disturbed (1972)
- Notes of a survivor (1977)
- Solid Gold Illusion (1983)
- Goodbye my Coney Island baby: A novel (1998)
- Homeless in the eighties: poetry, photographs, and paintings (1989)
- Homeless in the nineties: selected poetry (1994)
- Charles Darwin in Cyberspace: A Novel (1995)
- How I got out of jail and ran for governor of Indiana: the Jim Moore story as told to Claire Burch (1995)
- Stranger on the planet: The small book of Laurie (1997)
- What really killed Rosebud? (2001)
- Tales of young urban squatters plus How to squat (2003)

== Filmography ==
- Oracle Rising: The Recreation of the Original Haight Ashbury Hippie Psychedelic Underground Newspaper (1994)
- People's Park of Berkeley : then and now (1995)
- Timothy Leary's Dead (1996)
- The Ghost of Haight Ashbury Meets Timothy Leary (1998)
- The James Baldwin Anthology (2008)
