= Burch Creek =

- Location of the mouth within New York Burch Creek (the United States)

Location
- Country: United States
- State: New York
- County: Herkimer

Physical characteristics
- Source
  - coordinates: 43°07′05″N 75°06′27″W
- Mouth: Mohawk River
  - location: West Schuyler
  - coordinates: 43°04′53″N 75°08′12″W
  - elevation: 384 ft (117 m)
- Basin size: 4.60 sq mi (11.9 km^{2})

Burch Creek is a river in Herkimer County in the state of New York. It flows into the Mohawk River east of West Schuyler.

== Water quality ==
Streambank erosion on Burch Creek contributes sediment loads into the Erie Canal. Periodic dredging to restore adequate canal navigational depth causes further siltation and affects fish habitat.
