= Jonathan Birch (translator) =

English translator

- Born: July 4, 1783; Holborn, London
- Died: September 8, 1847 (aged 64); Prussia, Bellevue
- Occupation: author
- Known for: translator of Goethe's Faust dramas

Jonathan Birch (1783–1847) was an English author, best known as the translator of Goethe's Faust dramas.

== Life ==
He was born in Holborn, London, on 4 July 1783, the son of John Birch (1738–1815) and his wife Charlotte Henrietta Johnson Willdon. His elder sister Eunice Birch married Samuel Bagster the Elder; John Birch had known George Bagster (1739–1819), Samuel's father, from a group of evangelical young men to which they both belonged. Jonathan's younger brother Augustus Birch (1786–1840) was a British Army Commissariat Officer who settled in New South Wales in the late 1820s.

When Birch was young, he wished to become a sculptor, but in October 1798 he was apprenticed to an uncle in the city.

In 1803 Birch entered the house of Johann Gottfried Argelander, a timber-merchant at Memel and the father of Friedrich Wilhelm August Argelander. Birch remained there until Argelander's death in 1812; much of his time was spent travelling in Russia, Sweden, and Denmark. In 1807 the three eldest sons of Frederick William III of Prussia took refuge with Argelander for 18 months. They struck up a friendship with Birch.

In 1812 Birch returned to England and became a writer. In 1841 he was elected a foreign honorary member of the Literary Society of Berlin.

In 1846 the King of Prussia offered Birch a choice of apartments in three of his palaces. He chose Bellevue Palace, near Berlin, having regard to his son's artistic studies. At the end of 1846 he settled in Prussia. While his Nibelungen Lied work was in the press, he was taken ill, and he died at Bellevue on 8 September 1847.

== Works ==
Birch published:

- Fifty-one Original Fables, with Morals and Ethical Index. Embellished with 85 original designs by Robert Cruickshank
- A translation of Plutarch's "Banquet of the Seven Sages," revised for this work, London, 1833. The preface is signed "Job Crithannah", an anagram of the author's name. The Crown Prince of Prussia accepted a copy, and renewed the friendship formed at Memel.
- Divine Emblems; embellished with etchings on copper [by Robert Cruickshank], after the fashion of Master Francis Quarles. Designed and written by Johann Albricht, A.M., London, 1838; Dublin, 1839. The pseudonym is another anagram of Jonathan Birch. On sending the crown prince a copy he received in return a gold medal, of which only thirty were struck, and given by the prince to his particular friends.
- A translation of Goethe's Faust, the first in English covering also some of Part II. The first Part was published in 1839, and dedicated to the crown prince, who, on coming to the throne in 1840 as Frederick William IV, sent him the gold Huldigungsmedaille (medal of homage). The second Part was published in 1843, and dedicated to the King of Prussia. The translation was bowdlerised: in Birch's words, "masking such passages as might be considered objectionable to delicacy." Birch wrote to August Wilhelm Schlegel in 1840, from Henrietta Street, Brunswick Square, presenting him with the first part of the translation.
- From the German of Rulemann Friedrich Eylert, two translated works on Frederick William III.
- An English translation of the Nibelungen Lied, Berlin, 1848. There were further editions at Munich. Birch was assisted by Carl Lachmann, whose text he mainly followed, and the Grimm brothers. This was the first complete English translation of the Nibelungenlied, only fragments having previously been available. Another translation, by William Nanson Lettsom, appeared shortly afterwards.

== Family ==
In 1823 Birch married Esther Brooke, of Lancaster. They had five children, of whom a son Charles Bell Birch A.R.A. and a daughter survived him.
