= Birchwood, Wisconsin =

- Village
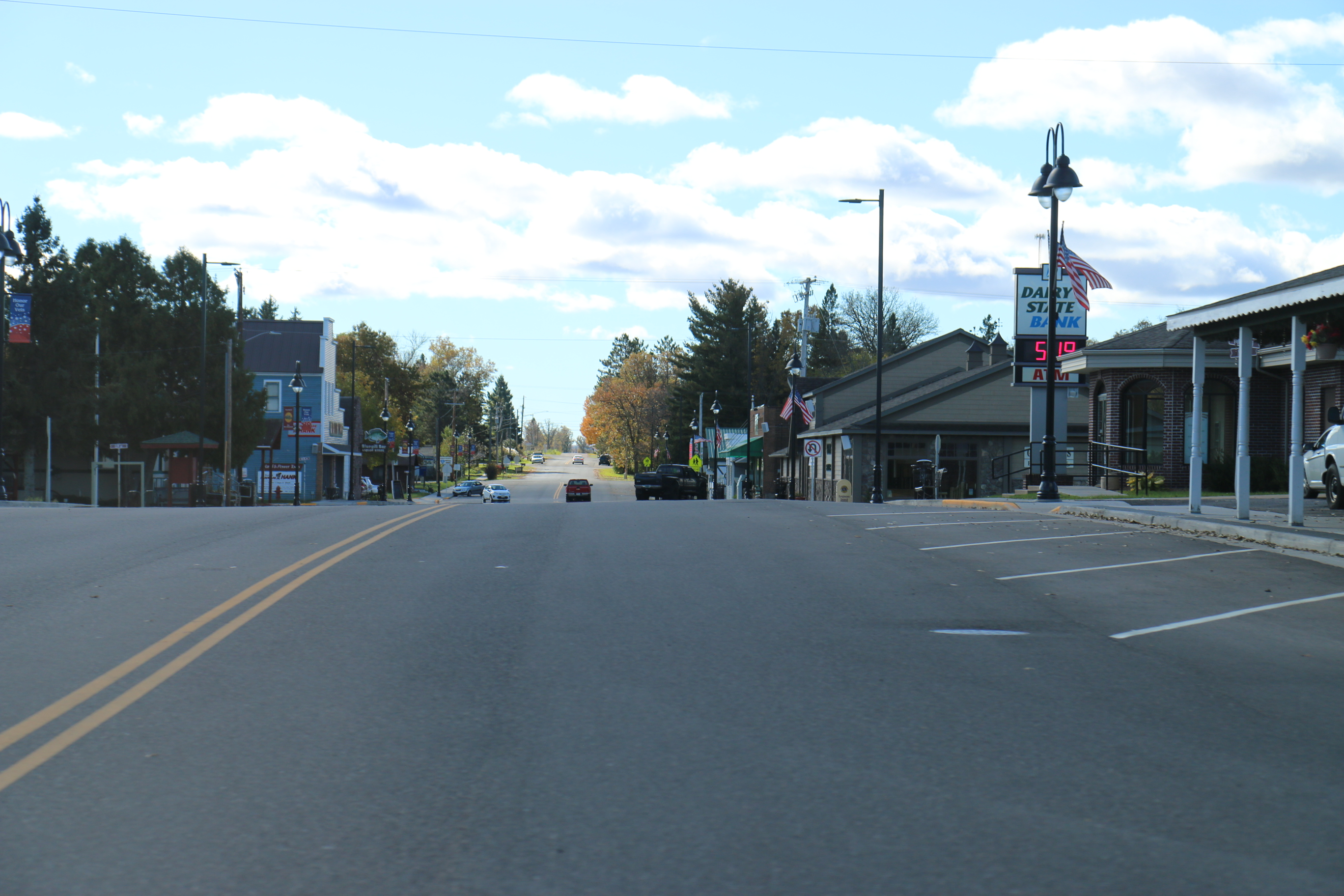
- Downtown Birchwood on WIS48
- Nickname: The Bluegill Capital of Wisconsin
- Location of Birchwood in Washburn County, Wisconsin.
- Coordinates: 45°43′33″N 91°36′32″W
- Country: United States
- State: Wisconsin
- County: Washburn
- Village: 1903

Government
  - President: John Depoister

Area
  - Total: 1.25 sq mi (3.23 km^{2})
  - Land: 1.08 sq mi (2.79 km^{2})
  - Water: 0.17 sq mi (0.43 km^{2})
- Elevation: 1,329 ft (405 m)

Population (2020)
  - Total: 402
  - Density: 365/sq mi (141.1/km^{2})
- Time zone: UTC-6 (Central (CST))
  - Summer (DST): UTC-5 (CDT)
- Postal code: 54817
- Area codes: 715 & 534
- FIPS code: 55-07575
- GNIS feature ID: 1582812
- Website: https://birchwoodvillage.wi.gov/

Birchwood is a village in Washburn County, Wisconsin, United States. The population was 402 at the 2020 census. The village is located within the Town of Birchwood.

== History ==
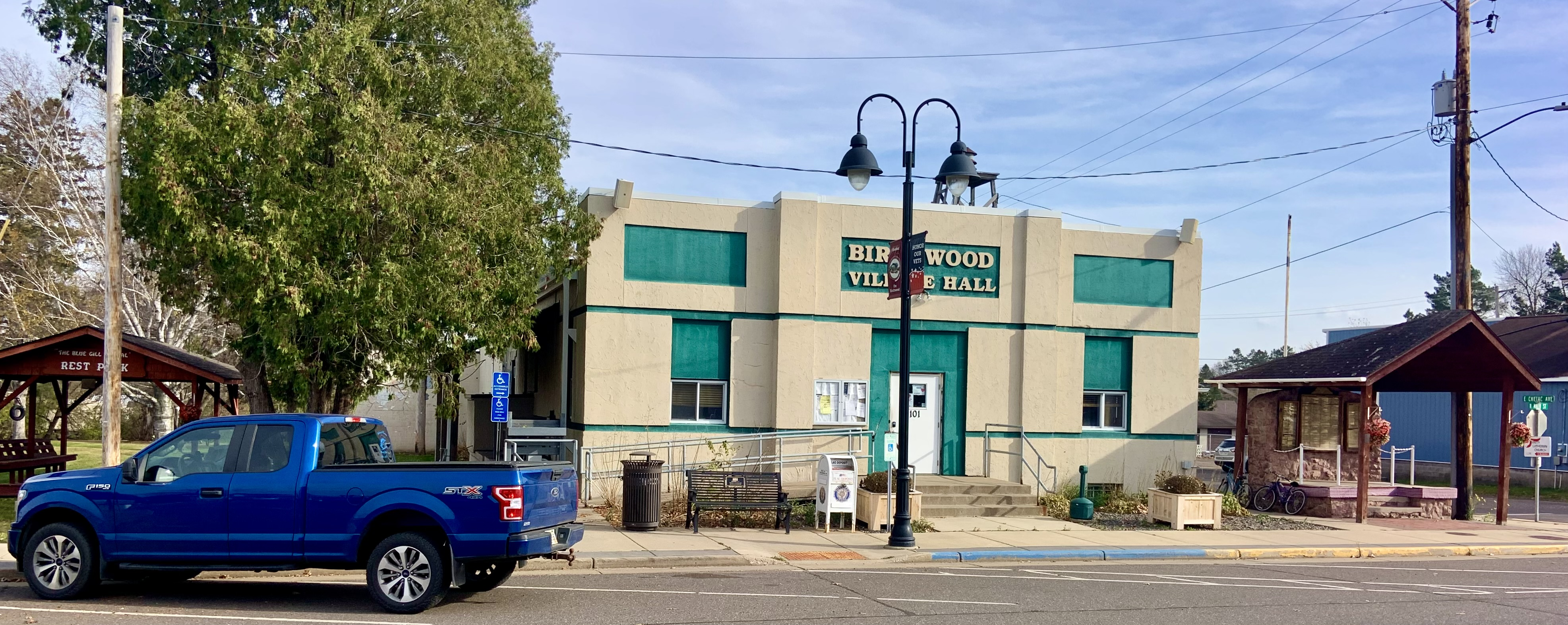
Birchwood Village Hall

=== Knapp, Stout & Company ===
Knapp, Stout and Company was a logging company in Northern Wisconsin. Founded in 1846 William Willson brought the company together. The company was originally owned by William Wilson, Andrew Tainter, John Knapp, and Henry Stout. Knapp, Stout and Co. became the largest lumber company in the world. In 1873 they owned 115,000 acres of pine forests. They put out 55,000,000 ft. of lumber, 20,000,000 shingles, and 20,000,000 lath annually. The company owned six big farms with six or seven thousand acres of improved land to supply the lumber camps with pork and wheat.

=== First Settlers ===
Knapp, Stout, and Co. had a major impact on Northern Wisconsin. The large lumber company brought the SS and Omaha railroads to northern Wisconsin. They also created many logging camps that turned into small towns. Birchwood is located where it is due to the Birch Lake lumber camp, and the crossing of the Soo and the Omaha railroads.

Birchwood WI was platted in 1901. Birchwood was originally named Loomis after Wilbur Loomis, one of the first residents, and the first storekeeper. In 1912 the name was officially changed to Birchwood due to a political argument, and the abundance of birch trees in the area.

=== The Birch Lake Dam ===
The Birchwood dam was first owned by Knapp, Stout and Co. The first dam was built in 1881 from logs. The dam was enlarged by Knapp, Stout, and Co. in 1893 when they found that the first dam was too small. In 1911 the dam was sold to Chippewa Light & Power Co., who built the first concrete dam. The dam was sold again in 1915 to the Wisconsin-Minnesota Light and Power Co. In 1916 the Wisconsin-Minnesota Light and Power Co. brought electricity service to Birchwood.

=== Birchwood's Best ===
In 1903 the Ahnapee Veneer and Seating Co. built a mill where Birchwood's Best now stands. After the mill burned down in 1906, it was rebuilt. In 1921 the name was changed to the Algoma Panel Co. and in 1931 to the Algoma Plywood and Veneer Co. In 1931 the mill was sold to the U.S. Plywood Corporation. In 1943 U.S. Plywood ceased operations. Eleven months later a new corporation was formed and named the Birchwood Lumber and Veneer Co. The companies that owned the mill did their own logging until 1932, when they started hiring subcontractors to do the logging. Throughout the 20th century the mill has been Birchwood's principal industry. In 2011 Birchwood's Best was acquired by the Masonite International, which continues its operations today.

=== Schools ===
In 1902, the residents of Birchwood set aside land to build the town’s first school. The original one room schoolhouse was replaced by a graded school in 1903. By 1909, the school was overpopulated. Classes were held in the local Methodist and Lutheran Churches until an addition could be built. A high school was added in 1921.

== Geography ==
According to the United States Census Bureau, the village has a total area of 1.26 square miles (3.26 km^{2}), of which 1.09 square miles (2.82 km^{2}) is land and 0.17 square miles (0.44 km^{2}) is water.

== Demographics ==
Historical population
Census	Pop.	Note	%±
1930	565		—
1940	531		−6.0%
1950	502		−5.5%
1960	433		−13.7%
1970	394		−9.0%
1980	437		10.9%
1990	443		1.4%
2000	518		16.9%
2010	442		−14.7%
2020	402		−9.0%
U.S. Decennial Census

=== 2010 census ===
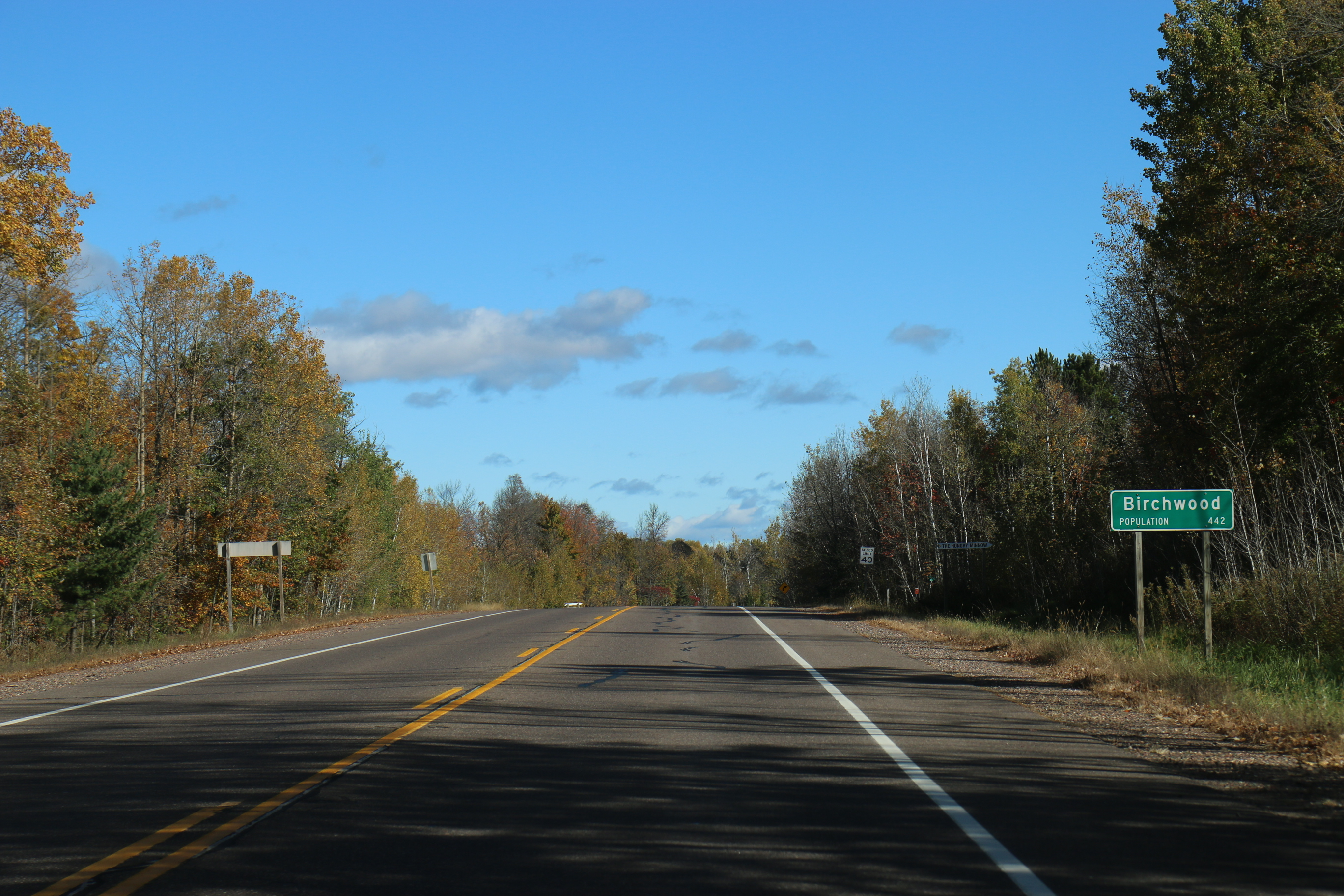
The sign for Birchwood on WIS48

As of the census of 2010, there were 442 people, 200 households, and 118 families residing in the village. The population density was 405.5 inhabitants per square mile (156.6/km^{2}). There were 290 housing units at an average density of 266.1 per square mile (102.7/km^{2}). The racial makeup of the village was 98.2% White, 0.2% African American, 1.1% Native American, and 0.5% from two or more races. Hispanic or Latino of any race were 1.1% of the population.

There were 200 households, of which 25.0% had children under the age of 18 living with them, 41.5% were married couples living together, 12.5% had a female householder with no husband present, 5.0% had a male householder with no wife present, and 41.0% were non-families. 35.0% of all households were made up of individuals, and 16.5% had someone living alone who was 65 years of age or older. The average household size was 2.21 and the average family size was 2.79.

The median age in the village was 43.7 years. 20.8% of residents were under the age of 18; 7.7% were between the ages of 18 and 24; 23.3% were from 25 to 44; 26.9% were from 45 to 64; and 21.3% were 65 years of age or older. The gender makeup of the village was 48.4% male and 51.6% female.

=== 2000 census ===
As of the census of 2000, there were 518 people, 227 households, and 142 families residing in the village. The population density was 459.7 people per square mile (177.0/km^{2}). There were 269 housing units at an average density of 238.7 per square mile (91.9/km^{2}). The racial makeup of the village was 96.33% White, 1.54% Native American, 0.19% Asian, 0.19% from other races, and 1.74% from two or more races. 2.32% of the population were Hispanic or Latino of any race.

There were 227 households, out of which 26.9% had children under the age of 18 living with them, 46.7% were married couples living together, 11.9% had a female householder with no husband present, and 37.4% were non-families. 33.9% of all households were made up of individuals, and 17.6% had someone living alone who was 65 years of age or older. The average household size was 2.28 and the average family size was 2.90.

In the village, the population was spread out, with 25.1% under the age of 18, 5.8% from 18 to 24, 25.3% from 25 to 44, 21.6% from 45 to 64, and 22.2% who were 65 years of age or older. The median age was 41 years. For every 100 females, there were 98.5 males. For every 100 females age 18 and over, there were 90.2 males.

The median income for a household in the village was $23,636, and the median income for a family was $35,795. Males had a median income of $22,000 versus $19,091 for females. The per capita income for the village was $14,237. About 4.5% of families and 11.9% of the population were below the poverty line, including 15.4% of those under age 18 and 8.2% of those age 65 or over.

== Education ==
Birchwood’s first school was a one room schoolhouse built in 1902. It was replaced by a graded school a year later. By 1909, the school was overpopulated. Classes were held in the local Methodist and Lutheran Churches until an addition could be built. A high school was added in 1921. Today, the village has three public schools: an elementary, middle, and high school. The high school is still located in the original building from 1921.

The village is also home to several charter schools. The Birchwood Public Montessori serves grades pre-k through 6. Grades 7 through 12 were served by the Birchwood Blue Hills Charter School from 2008 to 2023. That school has since been replaced by the Birchwood STEAM and Career Academy, which serves grades 6 through 12.

The Birchwood school district also operates Bobcat Virtual Academy, an online school open to students inside and outside the district.

The school district’s motto is “Individually unique, together complete”.
