= Samuel Birch =

Samuel Birch may refer to:

- Samuel Birch (Egyptologist) (1813–1885), British Egyptologist and antiquary
- Lamorna Birch (Samuel John Birch, 1869–1955), English artist
- Samuel Birch (athlete) (born 1963), Liberian Olympic sprinter
- Samuel Birch (Lord Mayor of London) (1757–1840), Lord Mayor of London
- Samuel Birch (British Army officer) (1735–1811), compiler of the Book of Negroes and namesake of Birchtown, Nova Scotia
