= James Alfred Birch =

British philatelist (1888–1969)

- Born: 8 October 1888
- Died: 11 December 1969 (aged 81)
- Occupation: Philatelist

James Alfred Birch (8 October 1888 – 11 December 1969) was a British philatelist who signed the Roll of Distinguished Philatelists in 1960.

Birch had award-winning collections of the stamps of Denmark, Norway, Sweden, Danish West Indies, Greenland, and Faroe Islands. He was a writer for numerous journals on Scandinavian topics and was awarded the Medal of Honour by the Copenhagen Philatelic Club for distinguished work in Danish philately.
