= Elizabeth Chamblee Burch =

American lawyer

Elizabeth Chamblee Burch is an American lawyer, currently the Fuller E. Callaway Chair of Law at University of Georgia, and from 2017 to 2018, the Charles Hughes Kirbo Chair at the same university. In 2013, she was elected to the American Law Institute. She received her undergraduate degree from Vanderbilt University, where she graduated cum laude. While obtaining her Juris Doctor degree (also cum laude) from Florida State University, she was an editor for their Law Review. She has been called before Congress as an expert in complex litigation.
