= Michael R. Burch =

American poet (born 1958)

- Born: Michael Ray Burch; February 19, 1958 (age 68); Orlando, Florida, U.S.
- Occupations: Poet, translator, essayist, editor, publisher
- Spouse: Elizabeth "Beth" Harris Burch
- Children: 1
- Writing career
- Genres: Poetry, literary translation
- Notable works: The HyperTexts (editor); Violets for Beth; O, Terrible Angel
- Movements: New Formalism, Neo-Romanticism
- Website: michaelrburch.com

Michael Ray Burch (born February 19, 1958) is an American poet, translator, essayist, editor, publisher based in Nashville, Tennessee. He is the founder and editor-in-chief of the online literary journal The HyperTexts.

Burch has more than 12,000 publications, including poems that have gone viral. Composers have set 107 of his poems to music in genres ranging from blues to classical, including three operas, and his poems have been translated into 23 languages.

== Early life and education ==
Burch was born in Orlando, Florida, in 1958, the son of an American Air Force serviceman and an English mother. When his father was posted to Thule, Greenland, where dependents were not permitted, Burch and his mother moved to England to live with her parents. He spent much of his early childhood there before the family later settled in the United States.

Burch began writing poetry in his early teens while attending high school in Nashville, Tennessee.

== Career ==
=== Poetry and publication ===
Burch's poems, essays, articles, and letters have appeared in publications such as TIME, USA Today, Writer's Digest, Writer's Journal, Writer's Gazette, The Lyric, Light Quarterly, Measure, Poet Lore, The Raintown Review, Trinacria, Ancient Cypress Press,, and The New Formalist. He had a weekly column in Nashville's City Paper, for three years until it folded in 2013.

Burch has been active in the contemporary poetry movements known as New Formalism and Neo-Romanticism. When poet Kevin N. Roberts launched Romantics Quarterly in Winter 2001, five of Burch's poems opened the inaugural issue. His villanelle "Ordinary Love" won the 2001 Algernon Charles Swinburne Poetry Award and was nominated for a Pushcart Prize. His poem "First They Came for the Muslims," modeled on Martin Niemöller's "First they came ...", was included by Amnesty International in its Words That Burn anthology, a free online poetry and human rights teaching resource produced with The Poetry Hour. His translation of Fadwa Tuqan's "Enough for Me" has been used in human rights courseware produced by the Anti-Defamation League in partnership with the Aspen Institute, and his poem "Neglect" has been published by the UN Refugee Agency.

=== Translation ===
Burch has translated poetry from Old English and other languages into modern English. Poets he has translated include Sappho, Bashō, Bertolt Brecht, Robert Burns, William Dunbar, Allama Iqbal, Ono no Komachi, Miklós Radnóti, Rainer Maria Rilke, Renée Vivien, Primo Levi, Fadwa Tuqan, and Sadako Kurihara. His translations also include anonymous Old English works such as "Caedmon's Hymn," "Bede's Death Song," "Deor," "The Wife's Lament," and "Wulf and Eadwacer." Burch also encouraged contemporary formalists he had published, such as Richard Moore, Rhina Espaillat, Jack Butler, Annie Finch, A. E. Stallings and Harvey Stanbrough to contribute to Romantics Quarterly.

=== Editor ===
Burch is the founder and editor-in-chief of The HyperTexts, an online literary journal he launched in the late 1990s. The journal publishes both established and emerging poets and has featured winners of the T. S. Eliot Prize, the Richard Wilbur Award, and the Howard Nemerov Sonnet Award, as well as several Pulitzer Prize nominees. It also accepts previously published work, unlike the "first-publication" convention common among literary journals.

Burch has served as an editor, board member, or advisor for several other literary publications, including Better Than Starbucks, where he edits international poetry and translations, as well as the Singapore-based Borderless Journal, The Chained Muse, New Lyre, and Poetry Nook.

He is also an editor, publisher, and translator of poetry about the Holocaust, the atomic bombings of Hiroshima and Nagasaki, the Trail of Tears, the Darfur conflict, and the Nakba. His Holocaust poem "Pfennig Postcard, Wrong Address" appeared in the anthology Blood to Remember: American Poets on the Holocaust.

=== Advocacy and activism ===
Also a peace activist, he is the author of the Burch-Elberry Peace Initiative, which has been published online by United Progressives and the National Forum of India. On October 21, 2010, Burch presented the Burch-Elberry Peace Initiative to Aziz Mekouar, the Moroccan Ambassador to the United States, at a reception held in the Grand Ballroom of Nashville's Vanderbilt Plaza hotel. Burch was also one of the featured speakers at a Freedom Walk for Palestinians held on October 10, 2009, in Nashville.

== Personal life ==
Burch is married to Elizabeth Harris Burch, a singer and actress; they have a son, Jeremy Michael Burch, who is a musician, singer and actor.

== Awards and recognition ==
Burch has received five Pushcart Prize nominations from The Aurorean, Romantics Quarterly, The Raintown Review, Trinacria, and Victorian Violet Press. In addition to winning the 2001 Algernon Charles Swinburne Poetry Award, he has placed in several other poetry competitions, including the Tom Howard/John H. Reid Poetry Contest.

== Works ==
=== Books ===
- Violets for Beth. White Violet Press. 2012. ISBN 9781466489516.
- O, Terrible Angel. Ancient Cypress Press. 2013. ISBN 9780988964815.
- Auschwitz Rose (forthcoming from Multicultural Books of British Columbia, Canada)

=== Awards ===
- "Ordinary Love" won the 2001 Algernon Charles Swinburne Poetry Award
- "In Flight Convergence" was nominated for the Pushcart Prize by The Aurorean
- "Ordinary Love" was nominated for the Pushcart Prize by Romantics Quarterly
- "Isolde's Song" was nominated for the Pushcart Prize by The Raintown Review
- "Discrimination" was nominated for the Pushcart Prize by Trinacria
- "Just Smile" was nominated for the Pushcart Prize by Victorian Violet Press
- "For Rhonda, with Butterflies" was nominated for a Best of the Net by Victorian Violet Press

=== Anthologies ===
- The Bible of Hell
- How Sweet The Night (a poetry CD published by Romantics Quarterly)
- Blood to Remember (anthology of Holocaust poetry)
- Velvet Avalanche
- Love Me Knots (a collection of 100 top contemporary love poems)
- Voices Israel Anthology
- There is Something in the Autumn
- Captivating Poetry
- The Book of Hope and Dreams
- Washing the Color of Water Golden (Hurricane Katrina anthology)
- listening to the birth of crystals
- Sailing in the Mist of Time
- The Best of The Eclectic Muse 1989-2003
- Poems for Big Kids
- Anthology of Contemporary American Poetry
- Little Brown Poetry "Best of 2002 Anthology"
- A Bouquet of Poems for children of all ages (published by The Lyric)
- The Centrifugal Eye's Anniversary Anthology 2005-2010
