= The Birch =

US undergraduate journal

The Birch is a national biannual undergraduate journal of Eastern European and Eurasian culture.

== History and profile ==
The Birch was established in 2004. The journal, which is run by undergraduates at Columbia University, is the first exclusively undergraduate journal of Slavic, Eastern European and Eurasian studies in America. It is published biannually, in fall and spring semesters. Any enrolled undergraduate can submit work to one of three sections: creative writing, literary criticism and culture and affairs. The Birch has featured interviews with the children of Vladimir Mayakovsky, Aleksandr Solzhenitsyn and Boris Pasternak. The Fall 2006 issue featured an interview with Eduard Shevardnadze.
