= Paul Birch =

Paul Birch may refer to:

- Paul Birch (basketball) (1910–1982), American basketball player and coach
- Paul Birch (actor) (1912–1969), American stage and film actor
- Paul Birch (writer) (1956–2012), British author and astronomer
- Paul Birch (footballer, born 1962) (1962–2009), English football midfielder
- Paul Birch (footballer, born 1968), English football striker
- Paul Hansen Birch (1788–1863), Norwegian general
