= The Burch Sisters =

American country music trio

- Origin: Jacksonville, Florida, United States
- Genre: Country
- Years active: 1988–1990
- Label: Mercury Nashville
- Past members: Cathy Burch; Charlene Burch; Cindy Burch

The Burch Sisters was an American country music trio composed of sisters Cathy, Charlene and Cindy Burch. Their debut single, "Everytime You Go Outside I Hope It Rains," was their only song to reach the Top 40 of the Billboard Hot Country Singles & Tracks chart, peaking at No. 23 in 1988. It was included their debut album, New Fire, issued in 1989 by Mercury Nashville.

== Discography ==
=== Albums ===
Title	Details
New Fire	Release date: 1989; Label: Mercury Nashville

=== Singles ===
Year	Single	Peak positions		Album
Year	Single	US Country	CAN Country	Album
1988	"Everytime You Go Outside I Hope It Rains"	23	—	New Fire
1988	"What Do Lonely People Do"	61	—	New Fire
1988	"I Don't Want to Mention Any Names"	45	—	New Fire
1989	"Old Flame, New Fire"	46	73	New Fire
1989	"The Way I Want to Go"	59	100	New Fire
1990	"Honey You Won't Break Mine"	—	—	—N/a
"—" denotes releases that did not chart

=== Guest singles ===
Year	Single	Artist	Peak positions	Album
Year	Single	Artist	US Country	Album
1990	"Tomorrow's World"	Various artists	74	—N/a

=== Music videos ===
Year	Video	Director
1989	"Old Flame, New Fire"	Marc Ball
