= Birchwood (town), Wisconsin =

Human settlement in Washburn County, Wisconsin, United States of America

Birchwood, Wisconsin
- Town
- Town of Birchwood
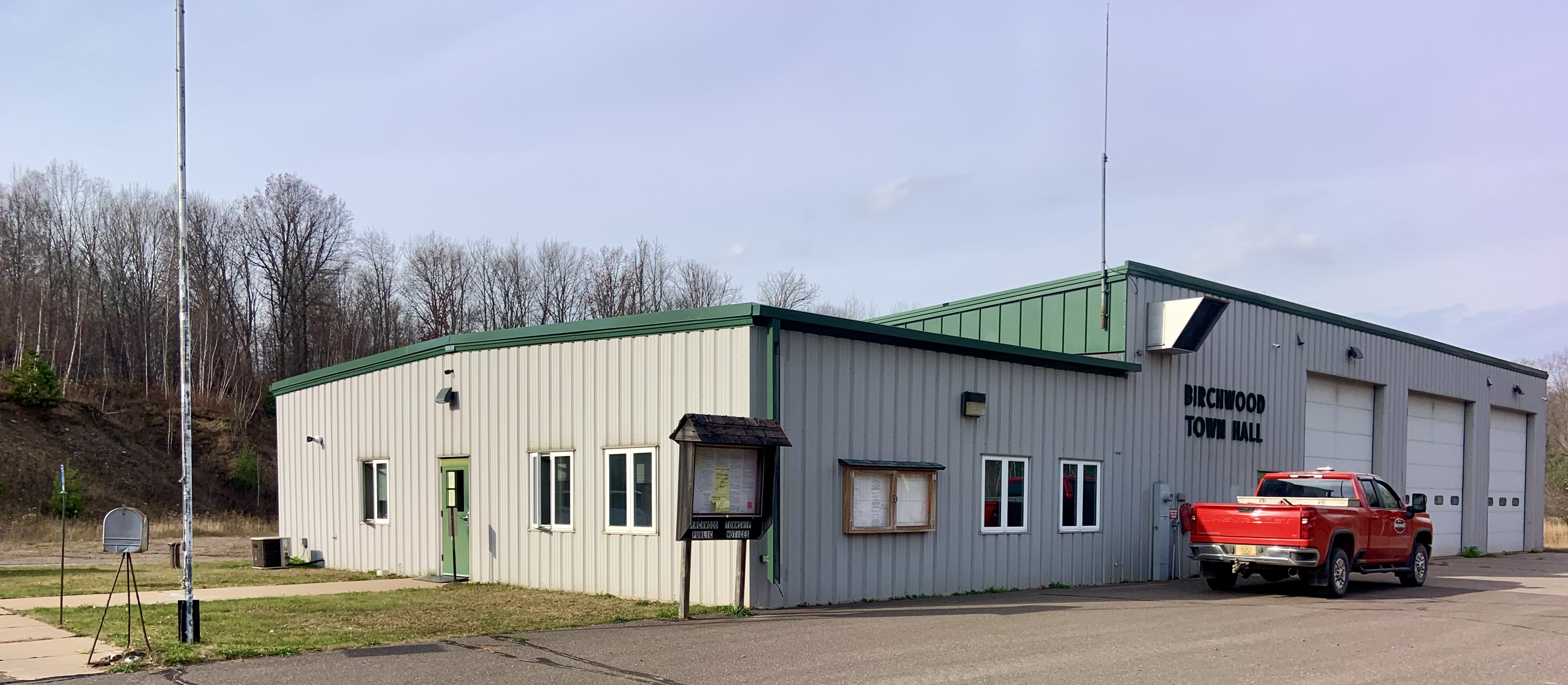
- Birchwood Town Hall

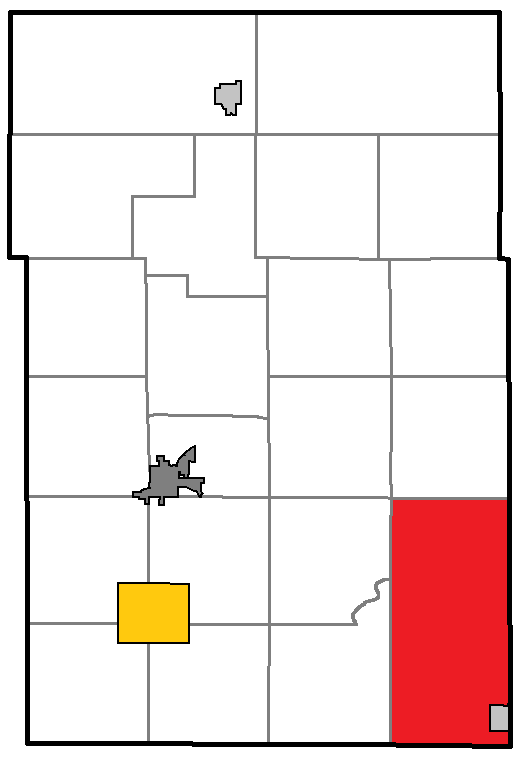
- Location of Birchwood, within Washburn County
- Coordinates: 45°42′00″N 91°36′01″W
- Country: United States
- State: Wisconsin
- County: Washburn

Area
  - Total: 70.04 sq mi (181.4 km^{2})
  - Land: 61.76 sq mi (160.0 km^{2})
  - Water: 8.28 sq mi (21.4 km^{2})

Population (2020)
  - Total: 605
  - Density: 9.80/sq mi (3.78/km^{2})
- Time zone: UTC-6 (Central (CST))
  - Summer (DST): UTC-5 (CDT)
- Area code(s): 715 & 534
- GNIS feature ID: 1582813

Birchwood is a town in Washburn County, Wisconsin, United States. The population was 605 at the 2020 census. The Village of Birchwood is located within the town.

== Geography ==
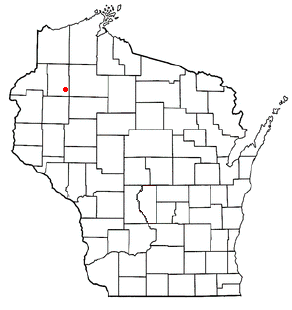
Location of Birchwood (town), Wisconsin

According to the United States Census Bureau, the town has a total area of 70.0 square miles (181.2 km^{2}), of which 63.8 square miles (165.3 km^{2}) is land and 6.1 square miles (15.9 km^{2}) (8.78%) is water.

== Demographics ==
As of the census of 2000, there were 453 people, 191 households, and 144 families residing in the town. The population density was 7.1 people per square mile (2.7/km^{2}). There were 528 housing units at an average density of 8.3 per square mile (3.2/km^{2}). The racial makeup of the town was 96.69% White, 0.22% Black or African American, 0.44% Asian, and 2.65% from two or more races. 0.44% of the population were Hispanic or Latino of any race.

There were 191 households, out of which 18.3% had children under the age of 18 living with them, 70.2% were married couples living together, 3.7% had a female householder with no husband present, and 24.6% were non-families. 19.4% of all households were made up of individuals, and 6.3% had someone living alone who was 65 years of age or older. The average household size was 2.37 and the average family size was 2.66.

In the town, the population was spread out, with 17.9% under the age of 18, 6.2% from 18 to 24, 21.4% from 25 to 44, 37.7% from 45 to 64, and 16.8% who were 65 years of age or older. The median age was 48 years. For every 100 females, there were 112.7 males. For every 100 females age 18 and over, there were 111.4 males.

The median income for a household in the town was $40,066, and the median income for a family was $41,397. Males had a median income of $30,625 versus $18,958 for females. The per capita income for the town was $21,062. About 6.7% of families and 9.2% of the population were below the poverty line, including 15.8% of those under age 18 and 4.1% of those age 65 or over.
