= Birchwood, Kewaunee County, Wisconsin =

Birchwood, Wisconsin
- Unincorporated community
- Location within Wisconsin Location within the United States
- Coordinates: 44°27′29″N 87°34′17″W
- Country: United States
- State: Wisconsin
- County: Kewaunee
- Town: West Kewaunee
- Elevation: 741 ft (226 m)
- Time zone: UTC-6 (Central (CST))
  - Summer (DST): UTC-5 (CDT)
- Area code: 920
- GNIS feature ID: 1561817

Birchwood is an unincorporated community located in the town of West Kewaunee, Kewaunee County, Wisconsin, United States. Birchwood is located on County Highway F, 3.5 miles (5.6 km) west of Kewaunee.
