= Michael Birch =

Michael Birch may refer to:

- Michael Birch (businessman) (born 1970), English computer programmer and entrepreneur
- Michael Birch (journalist) (1944–1968), Australian journalist
- Michael Birch, yachtsman, see Route du Rhum
