= John Birch =

John Birch may refer to:

- John Birch (Roundhead) (1615–1691), English politician and soldier
- John Birch (died 1735) (c. 1666–1735), nephew of the soldier, MP for Weobley
- John Birch (surgeon) (1745–1815), English surgeon and anti-vaccination activist
- John Birch (engineer) (1867–1945), English designer of pushbikes and automobiles
- John Birch (rugby league) (1878–1955), English rugby player
- John Birch, received 1879 a U.S. patent for the first cash register
- John Birch (missionary) (1918–1945), American military intelligence officer and missionary
  - John Birch Society (established 1958), the organization named after him
- John Birch (luthier) (1922–2000), English luthier
- John Birch (musician) (1929–2012), British organist and choral director
- John Birch (diplomat) (1935–2020), British diplomat
- John Birch (cricketer) (born 1955), English cricketer
- John Birch (rugby union), Irish rugby union player

== See also ==
- John Burch (disambiguation)
- Jonathan Birch (disambiguation)
