= Justice Burch =

Justice Burch may refer to:

- Allen Banks Burch (1894–1948), associate justice of the Kansas Supreme Court
- Newton D. Burch (1871–1931), associate justice of the South Dakota Supreme Court
- Rousseau Angelus Burch (1862–1944), associate justice of the Kansas Supreme Court

== See also ==
- A. A. Birch Jr. (1932–2011), chief justice of the Tennessee Supreme Court
