= Arthur Birch =

Arthur Birch may refer to:

- Arthur Birch (cricketer) (1888–1976), New Zealand cricketer
- Arthur Birch (organic chemist) (1915–1995), Australian organic chemist
- Arthur Birch (colonial administrator) (1836–1914), Lieutenant Governor of Ceylon
- Arthur Birch (jockey) (1875–1911), British jockey for the horse Moifaa
