= Jeff Birch =

English footballer

Personal information
- Full name: Jeffrey Birch
- Date of birth: 21 October 1927
- Place of birth: Sheffield, West Riding of Yorkshire, England
- Date of death: June 2005 (aged 77)
- Place of death: Sheffield, West Riding of Yorkshire, England
- Height: 5 ft 8 1/2 in (1.74 m)
- Position: Winger

Senior career*
Years	Team	Apps	(Gls)
- Selby Town
1947	Sheffield United	0	(0)
1947–1948	Scarborough		
1948–1949	Sheffield United	0	(0)
1949–	York City	7	(1)
Total		7	(1)
- * Club domestic league appearances and goals

Jeffrey Birch (21 October 1927 – June 2005) was an English professional footballer who played as a winger in the Football League for York City, in non-League football for Selby Town and Scarborough, and was on the books of Sheffield United without making a league appearance.
