= Wallace Birch =

English footballer

Personal information
- Date of birth: 6 March 1910
- Place of birth: Wortley, West Riding of Yorkshire, England
- Date of death: 1987 (age 76-77)
- Place of death: Kidderminster, England
- Positions: Inside right; outside right

Senior career*
Years	Team	Apps	(Gls)
- Grenoside Sports
1929	Luton Town	15	(3)
1930	Sheffield Wednesday	0	(0)
1931	Accrington Stanley	2	(1)
1932	Blackpool	0	(0)
- Kidderminster Harriers
- * Club domestic league appearances and goals

Wallace Birch (6 March 1910 – 1987) was an English footballer. He played fifteen Football League games for Luton Town in 1929, before having equally brief spells with Sheffield Wednesday, Accrington Stanley, Blackpool and Kidderminster Harriers.
