= Charles Bell Birch =

British sculptor

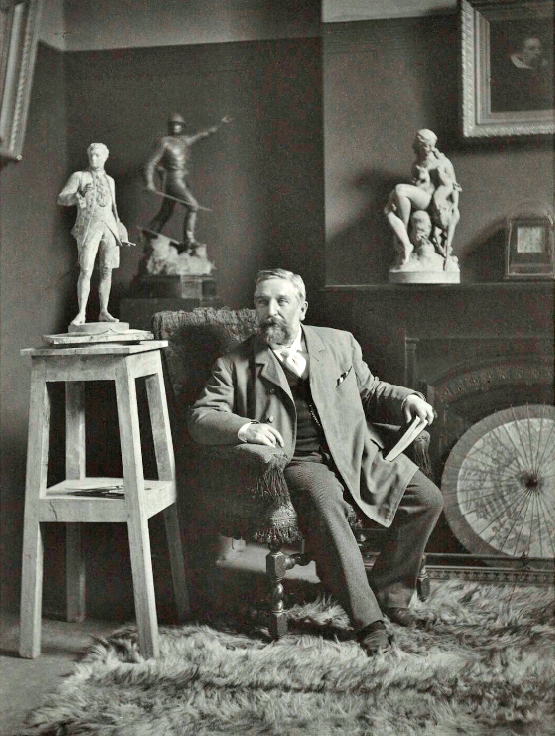
Charles Bell Birch, sculptor

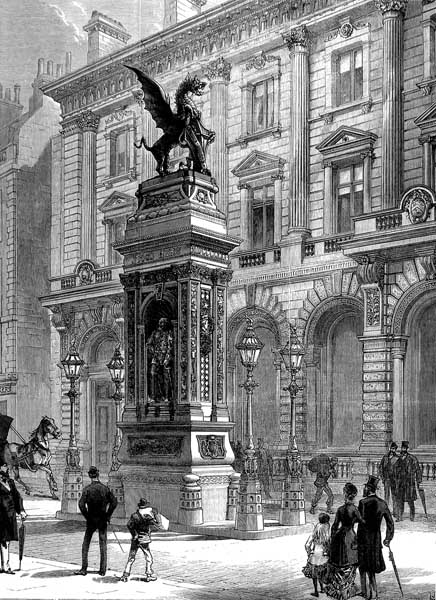
Temple Bar marker topped by Birch's heraldic Dragon. Temple Bar marker in front of the Royal Courts of Justice.

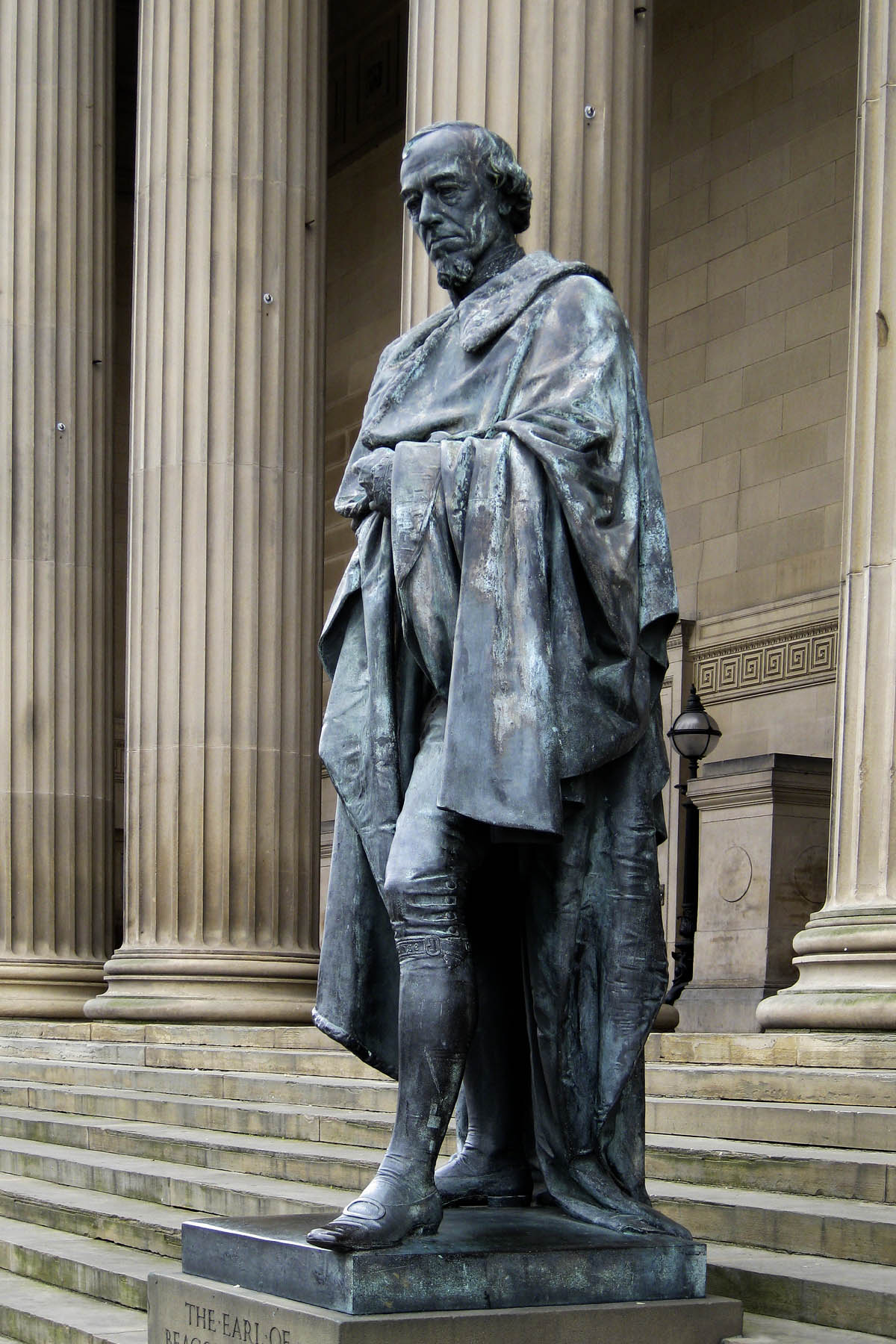
Statue of Benjamin Disraeli, 1st Earl of Beaconsfield by Charles Bell Birch, 1883, outside St. George's Hall, Liverpool

Charles Bell Birch ARA (28 September 1832 – 16 October 1893) was a British sculptor.

== Biography ==
Birch was born at Brixton in south London, the son of the author and translator Jonathan Birch (1783–1847) and his wife Esther (née Brooke). As a child he showed artistic promise, and at the age of twelve he was admitted to study at Somerset House School of Design. In the following year, 1845, his father moved to Germany, and Birch attended the Royal Academy in Berlin, where he produced his first significant work, a bust of the British Ambassador to Berlin, the Earl of Westmoreland.

Birch returned to England in 1852 and became a student at the Royal Academy of Arts, gaining two medals. For ten years he was principal assistant to John Henry Foley R.A. and from 1852 till his death he exhibited regularly at the Royal Academy, and was elected an Associate member of the academy in 1880.

Birch won a significant prize of £600 in an open competition in 1864 from the Art Union of London for his marble work The Wood Nymph, which was judged to be the "best original figure or group". It was subsequently selected as one of the representative works of British art for the Vienna, Philadelphia and Paris Exhibitions. To mark the Golden Jubilee of Queen Victoria's reign in 1887, Birch was commissioned to carve a statue, in Carrara marble, of the Queen for Udaipur in India. Subsequently, at least eight copies of this statue were cast in bronze for locations in Britain and throughout the British Empire. In 1891 he was one of eight eminent artists who were invited to submit designs for new British coinage.

Adrian Jones and Horace Montford were pupils of Birch.

== Selected works ==
- Wood Nymph (1864), his first really popular work
- Dragon (1880) on Temple Bar Memorial
- Statue of Lieutenant Walter Hamilton in Dublin (about 1880), now on display in the National Army Museum in Chelsea, London.
- Statue of Benjamin Disraeli (1883) in Liverpool
- Statue of George Brown (1884), one of the Fathers of Confederation, in Queen's Park (Toronto)
- Allegorical statues of "Justice" and "Plenty" (1887), for the Australian Joint Stock Bank, George Street, Sydney, New South Wales.
- Statue of William Earle (soldier) (1887) outside St George's Hall, Liverpool
- Fountain (1889) in the Royal Botanic Gardens, Sydney
- Statue of Queen Victoria (1896), at the north end of Blackfriars Bridge in London
- Statue of William Ward, 1st Earl of Dudley, (1888) Castle Street, Dudley, England
- Bust of Prince Frederick William of Prussia, taken from sittings before his marriage with the Princess Victoria
- The Last Call, a group representing the attempt to save the Residency at Cabul in 1879
- An equestrian statuette of William III, created for the King of the Netherlands
- A series of illustrations for Lord Byron's poem Lara created for the Art Union of London (1880)

== Sources ==
- Dodgson, Campbell (1901). "Birch, Charles Bell" . In Lee, Sidney (ed.). Dictionary of National Biography (1st supplement). London: Smith, Elder & Co.
