= I. L. Burch =

American politician

Member of the South Dakota Senate from the 17th district
- In office 1891–1892
- Preceded by: Stiles H. Bronson
- Succeeded by: John P. Ryan

Personal details
- Born: October 9, 1856 Nebraska, United States
- Died: February 23, 1939 (aged 82) Fremont County, Wyoming
- Party: None (independent)
- Spouse: Sarah Snodgrass
- Children: Seven

Irwin Leslie Burch (October 9, 1856 – February 23, 1939) was an American politician. He served in the South Dakota State Senate from 1891 to 1892.
