= Burch, West Virginia =

Unincorporated community in West Virginia, United States

Burch
- Location within the state of West Virginia
- Coordinates: 37°42′31″N 82°11′2″W
- Country: United States
- State: West Virginia
- County: Mingo
- Elevation: 735 ft (224 m)
- Time zone: UTC-5 (Eastern (EST))
  - Summer (DST): UTC-4 (EDT)
- ZIP codes: 25670
- Area code: 304
- FIPS code: 1728740

Burch is a historical name for Delbarton, located in Mingo County, West Virginia, United States.
