= Jim Birch (rugby union) =

Wales international rugby union player

- Born: James Birch; 30 December 1889 Northampton, England
- Died: 17 April 1968 (aged 78) Northampton, England
- Occupation: Police officer

Rugby union career
- Position: Prop
Amateur team(s)
| Years | Team | Apps | (Points) |
- Northampton RFC
| – | Neath RFC | | |
| – | Cardiff RFC | | |
| – | Glamorgan Police RFC | | |
International career
| Years | Team | Apps | (Points) |
| 1911 | Wales | 2 | (0) |

James Birch (30 December 1889 – 17 April 1968) was an English-born international rugby union prop who played club rugby for Northampton and Neath was capped twice for Wales. Birch was selected for Wales in a tit for tat reprisal by the Welsh Rugby Union after the Rugby Football Union selected Welshman Stanley Williams for England.

== Rugby career ==
Birch first came to note as a rugby player when he turned out for Northampton at the age of sixteen. He moved to Wales where he joined Neath. He was selected by the Welsh Rugby Union to play for the Wales national team during the 1911 Five Nations Championship, playing in two games, against France and Scotland. This was an excellent campaign for Wales and Birch found himself part of a Triple Crown and Grand Slam winning team.

As well as representing Neath, Birch also played for Glamorgan Police RFC, after joining the Glamorgan Constabulary in April 1910. In 1912 he switched clubs to first-class side Cardiff and spent three seasons with the club from 1912–13 to 1919–1920. He made 175 appearances for Cardiff. On his retirement he returned to Northampton where he served on the Northampton RFC committee.

=== International matches played ===
Wales

- France 1911
- Scotland 1911

== Bibliography ==
- Godwin, Terry (1984). The International Rugby Championship 1883-1983. London: Willows Books. ISBN 0-00-218060-X.
- Griffiths, John (1987). The Phoenix Book of International Rugby Records. London: Phoenix House. ISBN 0-460-07003-7.
- Smith, David; Williams, Gareth (1980). Fields of Praise: The Official History of The Welsh Rugby Union. Cardiff: University of Wales Press. ISBN 0-7083-0766-3.
