= Robert L. Birch =

American librarian, creator of National Trivia Day

- Born: August 9, 1925; Mobile, Alabama
- Died: July 26, 2005 (aged 79); Falls Church, Virginia
- Occupation: Librarian
- Known for: National Trivia Day

Robert Louis Birch (August 9, 1925 – July 26, 2005) was an American librarian known for creating National Trivia Day and other lesser-known holidays such as Swap Ideas Day and Lumpy Rug Day. National Trivia Day is celebrated in the United States and Canada and is seen as a way for organizations to share interesting facts about their subject areas. The holiday was first celebrated in 1980. Birch founded the Puns Corp, intended to help people have fun with words.

Birch was born in Mobile, Alabama, 1925 and grew up in Cuba. He got a degree from the University of Miami, Florida, with a double major in literature and philosophy and earned a master's degree in library science from the Catholic University of America in 1958. He served in the military during the Korean War.

Birch worked for the Patent Office Scientific Library and at the National Agricultural Library, each for ten years. He worked on a research project with the Science Index Group determining a way to make writing or speeches maximally intelligible. This work was centered around translations of Lincoln's Gettysburg Address. He did other library research into wording styles of material titles to determine what would make them most efficiently retrieved. He also published papers about Lincoln's speech style that suggested Lincoln was making use of similar wording and memory techniques. Birch was the president of the Lincoln Group of the District of Columbia.

Birch co-authored the book Memory Dynamics: A complete Memory System with Judge William Fauver which outlined how people could use "coded memory pictures" to recall information. He did presentations about these memory systems to professional librarian associations.

Birch lived in Falls Church, Virginia. He and his wife Grace had eight children.
