= Charles C. Burch =

American politician

Member of the Tennessee House of Representatives from the 8th district
- In office 1965–1971

Personal details
- Born: May 3, 1928 Chicago, Illinois, U.S.
- Died: May 1979 (aged 51)
- Children: 1 (adopted)
- Education: University of Wisconsin and NYU
- Occupation: lawyer

Charles C. Burch (May 3, 1928 – May 1979) was an American politician in the state of Tennessee. Burch served in the Tennessee House of Representatives as a Democrat from the 8th district of Shelby County from 1965 to 1971. He was an attorney, public defender, 1974 United States Congressional Candidate, professor of law at the University of Memphis School of Law and member of the Shelby County and American Bar Associations.
