= Benjamin Franklin Burch =

American politician (1825–1893)

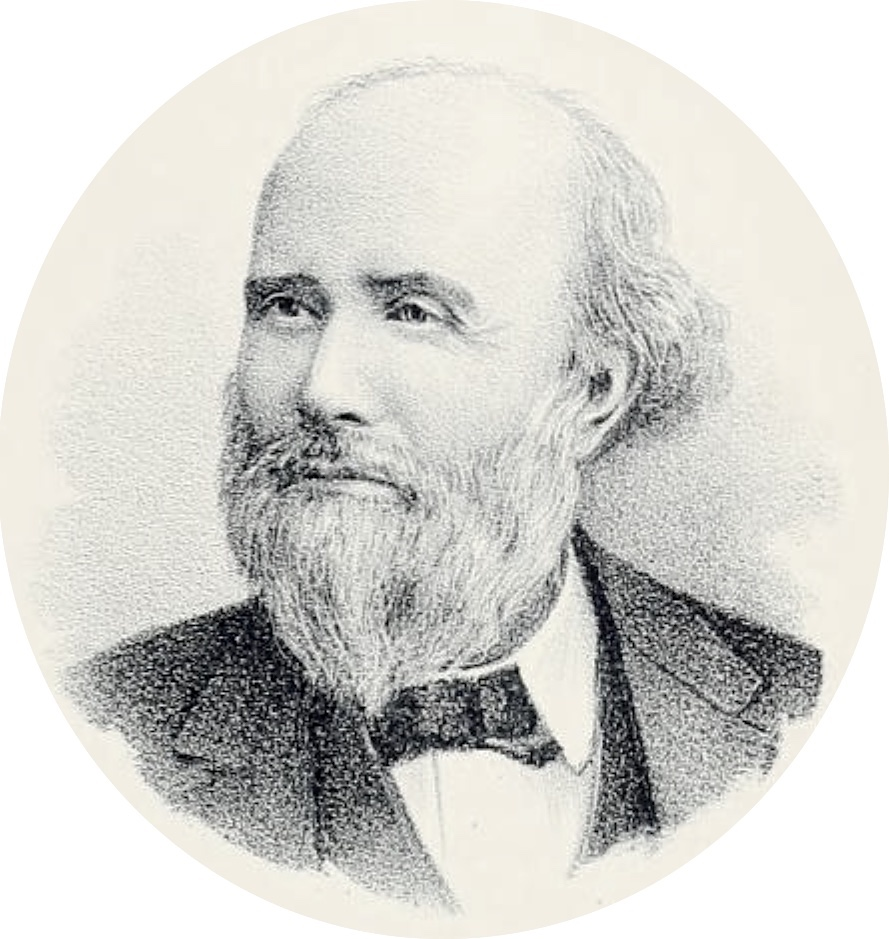
- Burch circa the 1880s

Delegate to the Oregon Constitutional Convention
- In office 1857
- Constituency: Polk County

Member of the Oregon House of Representatives
- In office 1859–1860
- Constituency: Polk County

President of the Oregon State Senate
- In office 1868–1870
- Preceded by: Thomas R. Cornelius
- Succeeded by: James D. Fay

Personal details
- Born: May 2, 1825 Chariton County, Missouri
- Died: March 24, 1893 (aged 67) Independence, Oregon
- Party: Democrat
- Spouse: Eliza A. Davidson

Benjamin Franklin Burch (May 2, 1825 – March 24, 1893) was an American farmer, soldier, and politician in what became the state of Oregon. A native of Missouri, he moved to the Oregon Country in 1845 and served in the Cayuse and Yakima wars. A Democrat, he represented Polk County at the Oregon Constitutional Convention, in the Oregon House of Representatives, and in the Oregon State Senate including one session as President of the Senate.

== Early life ==
Benjamin Burch was born in Chariton County, Missouri, on May 2, 1825, to Samuel Burch and Eleanor (née Lock) Burch. In 1845, he crossed the Great Plains on the Oregon Trail bound for the Oregon Country. He settled in what became Polk County in the Willamette Valley of Oregon. At the time it was under the authority of the Provisional Government of Oregon, and in 1848 became the Oregon Territory. In 1846, he helped Jesse Applegate and Levi Scott build the Applegate Trail, a route to the valley through Southern Oregon.

Burch then returned to his home where he had tutored Applegate's children before becoming a teacher at the first school in the county. After the breakout of the Cayuse War in 1847, he volunteered for the militia and served as an adjutant. Following the war, on September 6, 1848, he married Kentucky native Eliza A. Davidson who had immigrated to Oregon from Illinois the year before. They had seven children, including Benjamin Jr. During the Yakima War in 1856 Burch served as a captain of a company of militia.

== Political career ==
In 1857, he was elected to represent Polk County in the Oregon Constitutional Convention held in Oregon in August and September. At the convention he was part of a special committee with James K. Kelly and La Fayette Grover that designed the Oregon State Seal. Burch was also a member of the Military Affairs Committee. In 1858, he was elected to the first session of the state legislature as a Democrat representing Polk County in the Oregon House of Representatives. Oregon was still waiting to be admitted to the Union, and the legislature did not officially convene until 1859.

Burch remained out of politics until 1868 when he was elected to the Oregon State Senate. He represented Polk County as a Democrat during a four-year term. During the 1868 legislature he served as President of the Senate.

== Later years ==
In 1877, he became the Superintendent of the Oregon State Penitentiary in Salem by appointment of Governor Stephen F. Chadwick, serving two terms. He was appointed as the receiver at the Oregon City Land Office in 1887 by President Grover Cleveland. Benjamin Franklin Burch died on March 24, 1893, at the age of 67 at his farm near Independence.
