= Billy Birch =

Minstrel performer

William Birch
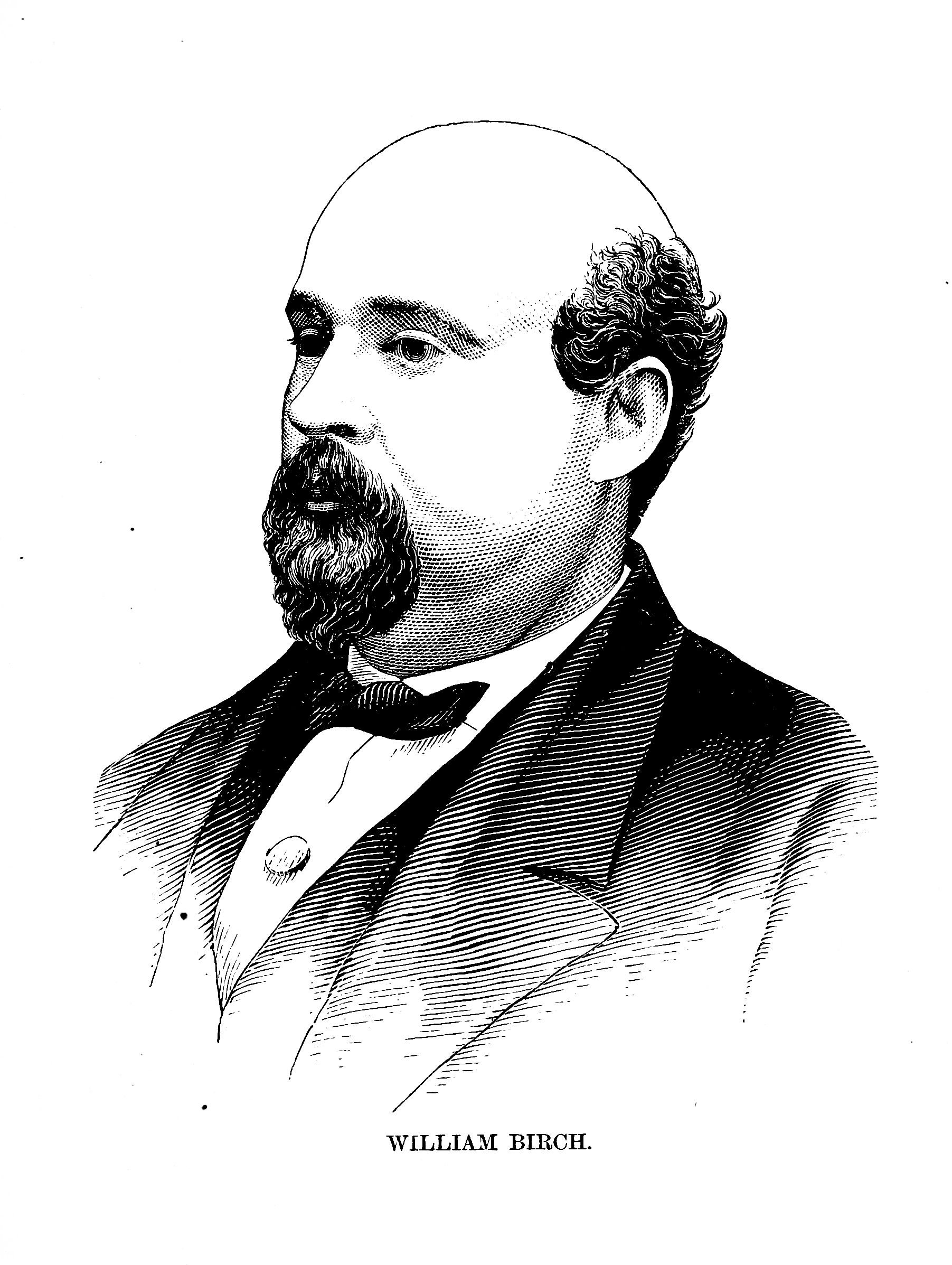
- Born: February 1831; Utica, New York, US
- Died: April 21, 1897 (aged 66); Utica, New York, US
- Occupation: Minstrel performer

William Birch (February 1831 – 21 April 1897) was a minstrel performer in the United States. An 1889 obituary referred to him as one of the oldest, best known, and most popular of the "Negro Minstral fraternity".

== Early life ==
Birch was born in Utica, New York, and began performing at age 13.

== Career ==
He performed with others at gold mining camps in California. He was on the ship Central America and was rescued at sea. He then performed in New York City before returning to California as his career waned.

He performed in blackface along with others in San Francisco in a theater where the Pacific Stock Exchange was later located. His performances in San Francisco included free-wheeling improvisation on current events.

He was on the ship SS Central America and was rescued by the S.S. Ellen before it sank. His wife was also rescued, and managed to tuck away her pet canary and take it to safety as well.

== Death ==
Birch died at home on 21 April 1897 from to paralysis of the brain and chronic Bright's disease.
