= List of Washburn University alumni =

The following is a list of notable people associated with Washburn University, located in Topeka, Kansas, United States.

== Arts and entertainment ==
- Elizabeth Barr Arthur (B.A. 1908) – poet, author, journalist, librarian, police officer, suffragist
- Mary Huntoon (B.A. '20) – artist, Federal Art Project state director, art therapist
- Bill Kurtis (J.D. '66; D.Lit. '85) – television journalist and producer
- Kerry Livgren, primary songwriter and founding member of progressive rock band Kansas
- Larry Niven (B.A. '62; D.Lit. '84) – science-fiction writer
- James Reynolds ('69) – actor; portrays Capt. Abe Carver on the soap opera Days of Our Lives
- Bradbury Thompson (1911–1995) (B.A. '34; D.F.A. 65) – graphic artist

== Business ==
- Greg Brenneman (B.B.A. '84; DComm '99) – chief executive officer, Quiznos; former chief executive officer, Burger King; former chief operating officer, Continental Airlines
- Rich Davis (1926–2015) – founder, Kansas City Masterpiece; former dean, University of North Dakota School of Medicine and Health Sciences
- John F. Kilmartin Jr. (1921–2004) – former chairman and chief executive officer, Mervyns
- Ronald K. Richey (1926–2010) – president and chief executive officer (1985–1998), Torchmark Corporation

== Government and politics ==
- Henry Justin Allen (1868–1950) – 21st governor of Kansas
- Georgia Neese Clark Gray (1900–1995; B.A. '21; D.B.A. '66) – 29th (and first female) treasurer of the United States
- Don O. Concannon ('52) – chairman of the Kansas Republican Party 1968–1970; unsuccessful candidate for governor in 1974

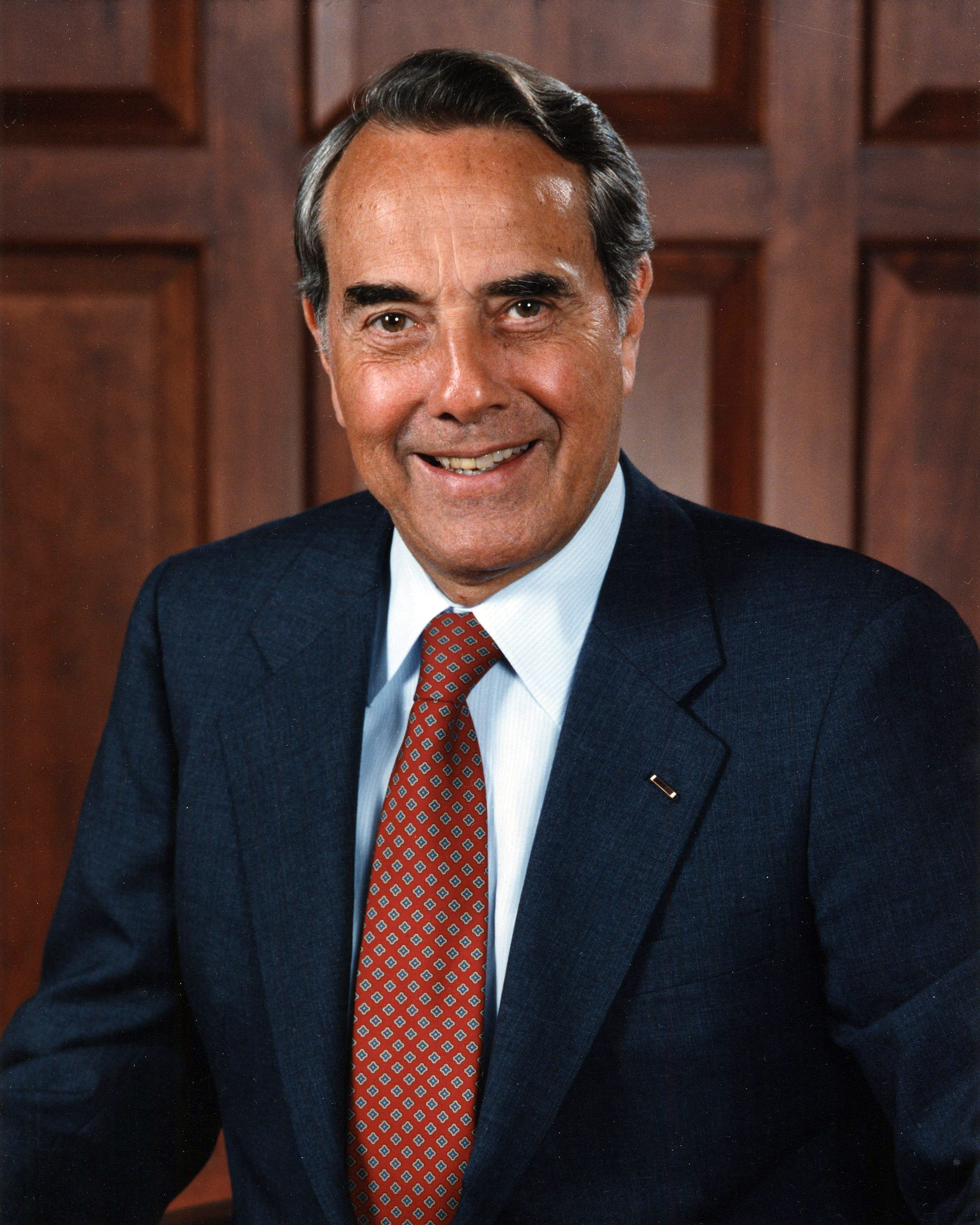
U.S. Senator Bob Dole

- Bob Dole (J.D. '52; LLD '69) – former U.S. senator from Kansas and Senate majority leader, Republican candidate for president of the United States (1996)
- John Edward Erickson (1863–1946; 1890) – governor of Montana and U.S. senator
- Joan Finney (1925–2001; B.A. '82; D.P.S. '95) – 42nd governor of Kansas (1991–95; the state's first female governor); Kansas state treasurer (1972–1986)
- Arthur Fletcher (1924–2005; B.A. '50; D.H.L. '90) – chairman, National Black Chamber of Commerce; director, U.S. Commission on Civil Rights; executive director, United Negro College Fund
- Denver David Hargis – U.S. representative from Kansas
- John F. Hayes – Kansas state representative
- Donald R. Heath – U.S. ambassador to Cambodia (1952), Vietnam (1952–1955), Lebanon (1955–1957) and Saudi Arabia (1958–1961)
- Harold S. Herd – Kansas state senator (1965–1972), Senate minority leader; mayor of Coldwater, Kansas (1950–1954)
- Delano Lewis (J.D. '63; LLD '00) – former U.S. ambassador to South Africa; former president, National Public Radio
- Charles D. McAtee – director of Kansas penal institutions during the last executions held in Kansas; candidate for Congress and attorney general (Republican)
- John McCuish ('25) – 34th governor of Kansas
- Dennis Moore (J.D. '70) – U.S. representative from Overland Park

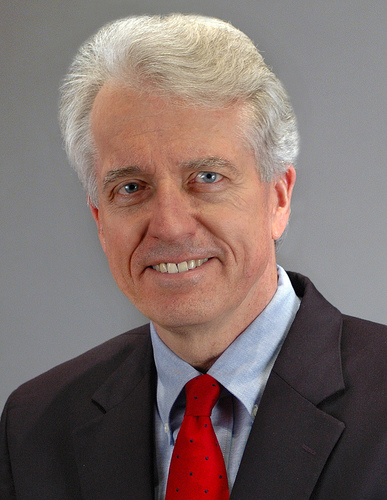
U.S. Representative James Slattery

- Paul J. Morrison – Kansas attorney general (2007–2008), district attorney of Johnson County, Kansas (1990–2007)
- Howard B. Myers, (Ph.D.) – director, Division of Social Research, Works Progress Administration during FDR's New Deal
- Roger Noriega (B.A. '82) – assistant secretary of state for Western Hemisphere Affairs, United States Department of State
- Mike Padilla – mayor of Topeka, Kansas (2022–present)
- Warren W. Shaw – Kansas state representative (1951–1957); candidate for governor of Kansas (1956); member of the Washburn Athletic Hall of Fame
- Jim Slattery – Kansas state representative (1973–1979); U.S. representative from Kansas's 2nd congressional district (1983–1995); candidate for governor of Kansas (1994), candidate for the U.S. Senate (2008)
- Robert T. Stephan – attorney general of Kansas (1979–1995)
- Robert Stone – speaker of the Kansas House of Representatives (1915), Kansas state representative (1905–1917)
- Ron Thornburgh – Kansas secretary of state (1995–2010)
- Togiola Tulafono (J.D. 1975) – governor of American Samoa (2003–2013)
- Douglas S. Wright – mayor of Topeka, Kansas (1983–1989)

== Journalism ==
- Arthur J. Carruth Jr. (1887–1962) – co-owner and editor, Topeka State Journal; chairman, Washburn Board of Regents; namesake of the university's Carruth Hall
- Reuben H. Markham (1887–1949) (B.A. 1908) – missionary educator in Bulgaria; journalist for the Christian Science Monitor, author of numerous books

== Law ==
- Sam A. Crow (1926–2022) – senior judge, United States District Court for the District of Kansas (1981–present)
- Lee A. Johnson (b. 1947) (J.D. '80) – Kansas Supreme Court justice (2005–present)
- Tyler C. Lockett (1932–2020) – Kansas Supreme Court (1983–2002); district court judge in Wichita (1977–1983); judge, common pleas court (1971–1977)
- Marla Luckert (b. 1955) (J.D. '80) – Kansas Supreme Court justice (2003–present)
- J. Thomas Marten (b. 1951) – district judge, United States District Court for the District of Kansas (1996–present)
- Kay McFarland (1935–2015) (B.A. '57; J.D. '64) – first female chief justice of the Kansas Supreme Court
- Eric F. Melgren (b. 1956) – district judge, United States District Court for the District of Kansas (2008–present)
- Loren Miller (1903–1967) – municipal court judge, County of Los Angeles, California (1964–1967)
- Nancy Moritz (J.D. '85) – Kansas Supreme Court justice (2011–2014); judge for 10th Circuit Court of Appeals (2014–present)
- Joseph Wilson Morris – senior partner, Gable & Gotwals (1984–present); general counsel of Shell Oil (1978–1983); chief judge, Eastern District of Oklahoma (1974–1978); dean, University of Tulsa College of Law (1972–1974)
- Paul J. Morrison (B.A.; J.D.) – former attorney general for the State of Kansas
- Fred Phelps (B.A. '62; J.D. '64) – disbarred lawyer and pastor of the Westboro Baptist Church, known for its extreme views on homosexuality, Christianity, and American soldiers; he and the Westboro Baptist Church were the subject of a U.S. Supreme Court case, Snyder v. Phelps
- Shirley Phelps-Roper (B.A. '79; J.D. '81) – daughter of Fred Phelps; attorney and spokesperson for the Westboro Baptist Church
- Eric Rosen (J.D. '84) – Kansas Supreme Court justice (2007–present)
- Gordon Sloan (1911–2006) (J.D. '35) – former judge on the Oregon Supreme Court
- Robert Stone (1866–1957) (B.A. 1889) – founder of Washburn Law School in 1903, speaker of the Kansas House of Representatives (1915)
- Ozell Miller Trask (1909–1984) – appointed by President Richard Nixon as a federal judge, U.S. Court of Appeals, Ninth Circuit (1969–1984)

== Science and technology ==
- Karl Bowman (1888–1973) – former chief of psychiatry at Bellevue Hospital in New York; former director of the Langley Porter Psychiatric Clinic at the University of California, San Francisco (1954–1964), superintendent of the Alaska Psychiatric Institute (1964–1967)
- Lauren Drain – nurse and author known for writing the 2013 book Banished, which chronicles her experiences and eventual banishment from the controversial Westboro Baptist Church
- Karl Menninger (1893–1990) – psychiatrist; co-founder, the Menninger Clinic
- Earl Wilbur Sutherland Jr. (1915–1974) (B.S. '37) – recipient, 1971 Nobel Prize in Physiology or Medicine
- Robert Whittaker (1920–1980) (B.S. '42) – plant ecologist; known for first proposing the five kingdom taxonomic classification and Whittaker Biome Classification

== Military service ==
- Brigadier General Arthur S. Champeny (1893–1979) – only man in U.S. history to receive the Distinguished Service Cross in three separate conflicts: World War I, World War II and Korea
- Rear Admiral Stanley Thomas Counts (1926–2015) – commanded USS Towers and USS Chicago during the Vietnam War
- Brigadier General Clarence T. "Curly" Edwinson (1912–1985) – flew 30 missions as a World War II fighter pilot; commander, 42nd Air Division, U.S. Air Force; all conference halfback at Washburn
- Major General Kathleen E. Fick – director of Intelligence of the National Guard Bureau
- Brigadier General Howard S. Searle (1891–1972) – assistant division commander, 35th Infantry Division
- Colonel Leroy W. Stutz (b. 1939) – U.S. Air Force pilot; shot down on his 85th mission in Vietnam; spent 2,284 days as a prisoner of war, including time at the "Hanoi Hilton" (attended WU in 1960, transferred to Air Force Academy)

== Sports ==
See also List of Washburn Ichabods head football coaches

- Corey Ballentine (b. 1996) – NFL cornerback and return specialist for the New York Giants, New York Jets, Detroit Lions, and Green Bay Packers
- Ernest Bearg (1893–1971) – WU football coach (1918–1919, 1929–1935), Nebraska coach (1925–1928), Nebraska football Hall of Fame (1988), Washburn Athletics Hall of Fame (1973–1974)
- Kurt Budke (1961–2011) – WU basketball and graduate assistant, head coach for Louisiana Tech (2002–2005) and Oklahoma State (2005–2011) women's programs
- Bob Davis (b. 1945) – radio broadcaster for Kansas City Royals and Jayhawks football and men's basketball teams
- Morley Fraser (1922–2004) – coach, Albion College (1954–1968), led school to 11 Michigan Intercollegiate Athletic Association championships
- Jim Holtgrieve (b. 1947) – golfer, three-time Walker Cup champion
- Davey Lopes (b. 1945) (B.Ed '69) – former manager, Milwaukee Brewers baseball team; 16-year Major League Baseball career
- Ron McHenry (b. 1962) (1984) – current women's basketball coach at Washburn
- Mike Racy (B.B.A. '87) – former NCAA vice president (1993–2013); 5th commissioner of Mid-America Intercollegiate Athletics Association
- Jerry Schemmel (b. 1959) (B.A. '82, J.D. '85) – radio voice of NBA's Denver Nuggets
- Troy Stedman (b. 1965) – linebacker for Kansas City Chiefs
- Dave Wiemers (b. 1968) – college football coach
- Cary Williams (b. 1984) ('08) – NFL cornerback, Tennessee Titans (2008–2009), Baltimore Ravens (2009–2012), Philadelphia Eagles (2013–2014), Seattle Seahawks (2014–present)
- Gary Woodland (b. 1984) – professional golfer on the PGA Tour, 2019 U.S. Open champion

== See also ==
- List of people from Topeka, Kansas
