= Daniel Biles =

American judge (born 1952)

Justice of the Kansas Supreme Court
- Incumbent
- Assumed office March 6, 2009
- Appointed by: Kathleen Sebelius
- Preceded by: Kay McFarland

Personal details
- Born: William Daniel Biles; August 12, 1952 (age 73) El Dorado, Kansas, U.S.
- Education: Kansas State University (BS); Washburn University (JD)

William Daniel Biles (born August 12, 1952) is a justice of the Kansas Supreme Court. Biles was appointed on January 7, 2009, by Governor Kathleen Sebelius to replace retiring Chief Justice Kay McFarland.

== Personal life and education ==
Dan Biles was born August 12, 1952, in El Dorado, Kansas. He graduated with a Bachelor of Science in journalism from Kansas State University in 1975 and his Juris Doctor from Washburn University School of Law in 1980. He is the father of three daughters.

== Career ==
Before becoming a practicing attorney, Biles was a reporter for the Associated Press Kansas Division from 1975 to 1980. After graduating from Law School, Biles joined the Kansas Attorney General's Office from 1980 to 1985 before entering into private practice.

In 1985 Biles became a partner of the law firm of Gates, Biles & Shields, P.A., which is based in Overland Park, Kansas. Biles focused his legal practice in the areas of Commercial Litigation, Education law, administrative law, appellate practice, Real estate transaction, employment law, transportation, municipal financing, civil rights, First Amendment cases and media law.

Biles while in private practice work was active in political endeavors as he was a member of the Kansas Turnpike Authority Board and also on the Kansas State Board of Education.

=== Kansas Supreme Court ===
Biles was one of three candidates recommended by the Kansas Supreme Court Nominating Commission to Governor Kathleen Sebelius. On January 7, 2009, Biles was appointed by Governor Sebelius, the other two choices recommended by the Kansas Supreme Court Nominating Commission were the Chief Judge Robert Fairchild and Judge Tom Malone. He assumed office on March 6, 2009.

== Associations and memberships ==
Biles is a member of the Kansas Bar Association; the Kansas Association for Justice, and the Johnson County Bar Association. In addition to his work in the legal community, Biles served as the director of Community Living Opportunities, Inc., which is a not-for-profit organization serving more than 370 children and adults with severe developmental disabilities specializing in residential, day programs, and case management in Kansas. Biles was a former member the National Council of State Education Attorneys.

Legal offices
Preceded by Kay McFarland	Justice of the Kansas Supreme Court; 2009–present	Incumbent
