= Kilmartin (surname) =

Kilmartin is a surname with Irish and Scottish origins. People with the name include:

- Gerald Kilmartin (1927–1970), American ice hockey player
- Jay Kilmartin, American politician from South Carolina
- John F. Kilmartin (1921–2004)
- Laurie Kilmartin, American comedian
- Mandy Kilmartin, American politician
- Pamela M. Kilmartin, New Zealand astronomer
- Peter Kilmartin (b. 1962), American attorney
- Terence Kilmartin (1922–1991), Irish journalist and translator

== See also ==
- Kilmartin, village in Scotland
