= Edwin Wilber Cunningham =

American judge (1842–1905)

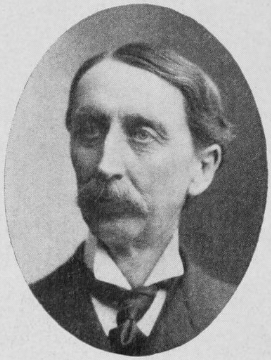

Justice of the Kansas Supreme Court
- In office January 15, 1901 – August 16, 1905

Personal details
- Born: August 31, 1842 Clarksfield, Ohio
- Died: August 16, 1905 (aged 62) Boulder, Colorado
- Spouse: Deborah A. Rowland (m. 1867)
- Children: 5
- Education: Hillsdale College
- Occupation: Lawyer, educator

Edwin Wilber Cunningham (August 31, 1842 – August 16, 1905) was a justice of the Kansas Supreme Court from January 15, 1901, to August 16, 1905.

== Early life, military service, and career ==
Born in Clarksfield, Ohio, Cunningham attended the country district schools and Baldwin University in Berea, Ohio. During the American Civil War, he enlisted as a private in company D, 101st Ohio Infantry, in July 1862, where he was the youngest person in his company, and was discharged after one year's service. He then enlisted in the regular service as a hospital steward, and served until January 1864. He then entered Hillsdale College in Michigan, from which he graduated in 1866, after which he taught in schools there for two years.

In the fall of 1867 he became superintendent of schools at Milan, Ohio. After one year he accepted a similar position at Urbana, Illinois, where he remained for one year. He began reading law in Urbana, and was admitted to the bar in June, 1869, and the following month moved to Emporia, Kansas, for the practice of his profession. He was probate judge of Lyon County, Kansas for three terms. In 1876, Cunningham met Mason McCarty, also an attorney in Emporia, on a train from Topeka to Burlingame, and from that meeting formed a law partnership lasting for the next fifteen years.

== Judicial service ==
In 1901, Governor William Eugene Stanley appointed Cunningham to one of four newly created seats on the state supreme court. Cunningham was reelected to the seat for a two-year term in 1902, and to a six-year term in 1904. However, less than a year into the latter term, Cunningham went to a medical facility in Boulder, Colorado, for treatment for an illness, and despite some early signs of recovery, died there on August 16, 1905, at the age of 63.

== Personal life ==
Cunningham married Deborah A. Rowland of Clarksfield, Ohio, in 1867, with whom he had five children, of whom four survived to adulthood.

Political offices
Preceded by Newly created seat	Justice of the Kansas Supreme Court; 1901–1905	Succeeded by Charles Burleigh Graves
