= Jochems =

Jochems is a surname. Notable people with this surname include:

- Annaleese Jochems (born 1994), New Zealand writer and bookseller
- Günter Jochems (1928–1991), German ice hockey player
- William D. Jochems (1886–1960), American judge
