= J.L. Weigand Jr. Notre Dame Legal Education Trust =

The J.L. Weigand Jr. Notre Dame Legal Education Trust awards extensive law school scholarships to Kansas residents. The non-profit trust was established in 2003 through a bequest by Wichita, Kansas attorney J.L. Weigand Jr. following his death in 2002. The Trust's stated purpose is to "actively promote excellence in legal education and to encourage the most scholastically qualified students who are long-term Kansas residents to remain in or return to Kansas to practice law." The Trust's scholarships are available to students and prospective students at the University of Notre Dame Law School, the University of Kansas School of Law, and Washburn University School of Law.

== Eligibility ==
Students must be legal residents of the State of Kansas for a minimum of ten cumulative years prior to entering law school, although the ten years need not be consecutive nor the most recent. In addition, students must have taken the LSAT and have applied to at least one of the partner schools. The annual application deadline is February 1.

== Benefits ==
Scholarships awarded by the Trust vary in amount based on other scholarships, size of applicant base, funds available and trustee discretion. Scholarship recipients are required to reapply annually.

Beyond any financial award, the Trust provides scholar and alumni services in the form of: Legal Links, a mentoring program; monthly social gatherings across the state of Kansas; a course outline database; and networking opportunities. Local alumni chapters are organized in Wichita, Topeka, and Kansas City.
