= Lawton Nuss =

American judge (born 1952)

Chief Justice of the Kansas Supreme Court
- In office August 1, 2010 – December 17, 2019
- Preceded by: Robert E. Davis
- Succeeded by: Marla Luckert

Justice of the Kansas Supreme Court
- In office October 17, 2002 – December 17, 2019
- Appointed by: Bill Graves
- Preceded by: Edward Larson
- Succeeded by: K. J. Wall

Personal details
- Born: December 30, 1952 (age 72) Salina, Kansas, U.S.
- Spouse: Barbara Nuss
- Education: University of Kansas (BA, JD)

Lawton R. Nuss (born December 30, 1952) is a former Kansas Supreme Court justice appointed by Governor Bill Graves in August 2002. By virtue of tenure, he became chief justice upon Robert E. Davis's resignation. Nuss announced his decision to retire, effective December 17, 2019.

== Personal life ==
Lawton R. Nuss was born in Salina, Kansas in 1952. After graduating from Salina High School in 1970, he attended the University of Kansas on a Naval Reserve Officers' Training Corps scholarship. He graduated in January 1975 with Bachelor of Arts in English and history and was commissioned a second lieutenant in the United States Marine Corps. He then served as a combat engineering officer with the Fleet Marine Force Pacific. After his discharge in 1979, he entered law school at the University of Kansas, earning a Juris Doctor in May 1982.

== Professional life ==
Nuss began his law practice with the Salina law firm of Clark, Mize and Linville, Chartered in August 1982. For the next 20 years, he was involved in a wide range of legal issues and proceedings. He represented corporations and individuals as plaintiffs as well as defendants in civil cases. He also represented the government as well as defendants in criminal cases. Based upon surveys of judges and fellow lawyers, during this time he was awarded an AV" rating from Martindale-Hubbell, that organization's highest rating for legal ability and professional ethics.

Nuss' professional activities while a lawyer included serving as chairman of the board of editors for the Journal of the Kansas Bar Association; as president of the Kansas Association of Defense Counsel, where he also received the Distinguished Service Award and the Defense Research Institute Exceptional Performance Citation; as president of the Saline-Ottawa County Bar Association; and as a mediator for the United States District Court for the District of Kansas. Nuss also served as chairman of the Salvation Army advisory board, and as a member of the board of trustees of St. John's Military School, the board of directors of the Salina Child Care Association, the board of directors of the Friends of the Salina Public Library, the board of advisors of the Coronado Area Council of Boy Scouts. and the Site Council for Roosevelt-Lincoln Middle School. He was appointed to the supreme court by Governor Bill Graves in August 2002, becoming the first court member in more than 20 years to move directly from the practice of law to the bench.

Nuss served as chairman of the Kansas Judicial Council, an organization created in 1927 by the Kansas Legislature. The Judicial Council, whose members include the chairpersons of the judiciary committees of the Kansas Senate and Kansas House of Representatives, is authorized by the legislature to study any area of law and to recommend improvements in the administration of justice. It may accept assignments from the legislature or the Supreme Court in fulfilling those responsibilities.

Nuss further served as the Departmental Justice for Kansas' First Judicial Department, an area stretching approximately from Salina north to the Nebraska border and west to the Colorado border. Additionally, he is the supreme court liaison to the Kansas Client Protection Fund Commission. The Commission's goal is to promote public confidence in the administration of justice and the integrity of the legal profession by reimbursing losses to clients caused by the dishonest conduct of lawyers. Justice Nuss is also the Court liaison to the Kansas Board of Law Examiners, which tests lawyers for their abilities to practice law in the state, and to the Kansas Board of Court Reporters which licenses court reporters.

Nuss also served as co-chair of the State and Federal Courts Committee of the Kansas Bar Association. He is a member of the board of editors for the Journal of the Kansas Bar Association, the advisory board for the Topeka-Shawnee County Youth Court, the United States Supreme Court Historical Society, the Dwight D. Opperman Institute of Judicial Administration at New York University School of Law, the American Judges Association, and the Kansas Bar Association.

Nuss is a graduate of the Appellate Judges School at New York University School of law and the United States Naval Justice School of Newport, Rhode Island. He is also the author of several published legal and historical articles and is a frequent presenter for legal and lay audiences.

Nuss has five grown children. He and his wife, Barbara reside in Topeka.

== Awards ==
- Distinguished Service Award from the Kansas Association of Defense Counsel
- Defense Research Institute Exceptional Performance Citation
- "AV" rating from Martindale-Hubbell, that organization's highest rating for legal ability and professional ethics.

Legal offices
| Preceded by Robert E. Davis | Chief Justice of the Kansas Supreme Court; 2010–2019 | Succeeded by Marla Luckert |
| Preceded by Edward Larson | Justice of the Kansas Supreme Court; 2002–2019 | Succeeded by K. J. Wall |
