= Harold R. Fatzer =

American judge (1910–1989)

Harold R. Fatzer (August 3, 1910 – September 30, 1989) was an American jurist. He was a justice of the Kansas Supreme Court from March 1, 1956, to September 1, 1971, then served as chief justice from September 1, 1971, to September 19, 1977. When he retired he was succeeded as chief justice by Alfred G. Schroeder and Kay McFarland was appointed to fill the remaining place.

He was born in Fellsburg, Kansas, to John R. and Rella Shannon Fatzer, and had a sister, Helen. He achieved his law degree in 1933 from Washburn University School of Law He was named assistant state attorney general in May 1943, then volunteered for the United States Army in September of that year and served in World War II until November 1945. He was married March 21, 1934 to Frances Schwaup, and they had a son John R. Fatzer.

He died from a self-inflicted gunshot wound and was found on September 30, 1989, in his Topeka home. He left no note, but was thought to have been depressed over health issues, having heart disease and suspected lung malignancy.

Legal offices
Preceded by Robert T. Price	Chief Justice of the Kansas Supreme Court; 1971–1977	Succeeded by Alfred G. Schroeder
Preceded by William West Harvey	Justice of the Kansas Supreme Court; 1956–1977	Succeeded by Kay McFarland
