= Alex M. Fromme =

American judge (1915–1982)

Alex M. Fromme (March 11, 1915 – October 25, 1982) was a justice of the Kansas Supreme Court from May 2, 1966, to October 25, 1982. He was succeeded by Tyler C. Lockett several months after his death.

Fromme was appointed to the supreme court to fill the position vacated by the retirement of Chief Justice Jay S. Parker. He wrote more than 550 opinions while serving on the court, and also taught at legal ethics at Washburn University School of Law.

He was born in Hoxie, Kansas and obtained his law degree in 1939 from the Washburn University School of Law. He practised law in a private practice with his brother Joseph. from 1961 till 1962 he was the president of the Kansas Bar Association.

He married Ruth Marie Kesler on September 16, 1939, with whom he had three sons and three daughters.

He died Monday October 25, 1982, at the age of 67 at St. Francis Hospital and Medical Center in Topeka.

Political offices
| Preceded by Jay S. Parker | Justice of the Kansas Supreme Court; 1966–1982 | Succeeded by Tyler C. Lockett |
