= Jay S. Parker =

American judge (1895–1969)

Jay S. Parker (July 1, 1895 – April 28, 1969) was a justice of the Kansas Supreme Court from January 11, 1943, to January 14, 1957, serving as chief justice from January 14, 1957 to May 1, 1966.

== Life and education ==
Parker was born in Morland, Kansas July 1, 1895, and educated in Hill City graduating from high school in 1913. He obtained his law degree in 1918 from the University of Kansas School of Law and proceeded to start practising law in Hill City.

He had an interest in crippled children and was the key sponsor of the Crippled Children Law in Kansas.

== Career ==
In 1922, he was elected as the Graham County attorney, and served six terms in that office. He resigned that position when he was appointed to the position of Assistant Attorney General in 1938. He was the Kansas Attorney General January 9, 1939 to January 11, 1943.

He ran in 1942 for the fourth position on the supreme court as a Republican against Harry K. Allen the incumbent Democrat. Winning the seat he vacated the Attorney General position that was taken by the then Assistant Attorney General Alexander Baldwin Mitchell from Lawrence.

Parker became the Chief Justice as the most senior justice when Walter G. Thiele retired due to court mandatory retirement rules. Walter G. Thiele had only been in the role a few days due to automatically becoming the chief justice when William A. Smith resigned before the end of his term.

Parker ran to retain the position for a second term which he achieved obtaining 75% of the vote in favour. In February 1966 he announced that he would retire on May 1, 1966 several months earlier than the end of the full term.

== Death ==
Parker died in a Topeka, Kansas convalescence center on April 28, 1969, aged 73, after suffering with cancer and a cerebral haemorrhage. He left behind his wife Virginia Grace Parker and a daughter Mrs. Floyd Pinnick, he also had a sister and three brothers. He is buried in the Hill City cemetery.

Party political offices
Preceded by Clarence Victor Beck	Republican nominee for Kansas Attorney General; 1938, 1940	Succeeded by Alexander Baldwin Mitchell
Legal offices
Preceded by Walter G. Thiele	Chief Justice of the Kansas Supreme Court; 1957–1966	Succeeded by Robert T. Price
Preceded by Harry K. Allen	Justice of the Kansas Supreme Court; 1943–1957	Succeeded by Alex M. Fromme
Preceded by Clarence Victor Beck	Kansas Attorney General; 1939–1943	Succeeded by Alexander Baldwin Mitchell
