= Robert Stone (attorney) =

American politician, attorney and civic leader (1866-1957)

Speaker of the Kansas House of Representatives

Personal details
- Born: March 2, 1866 Topeka, Kansas, U.S.
- Died: June 24, 1957 (aged 91) Topeka, Kansas, U.S.
- Party: Republican
- Spouse: Lillian A. Frazeur
- Profession: Attorney

Robert Stone (March 2, 1866 – June 24, 1957) was the Speaker of the Kansas House of Representatives and a prominent attorney and civic leader in Kansas.

== Family ==
Stone was born in Topeka, Kansas to Jesse and Sarah (Packard) Stone. Jesse Stone was a Baptist clergyman. His parents moved to Kansas from New England where they could trace their lineage to three brothers who had moved to the colonies in 1635. One of the three, Gregory Stone, owned a farm in Boston which became part of the Harvard campus. Stone's father was active in the free state movement.

On New Years Day 1892, Stone married Lillian A. Frazeur, daughter of Topeka merchant Walter Gillette Frazuer. Together they had one child, a daughter, Lilian, who on January 1, 1916 married Beryl R. Johnson (September 14, 1892— July 29, 1981). Lilian and Beryl Johnson were both graduates of Stone's alma mater, Washburn University. Beryl Johnson would go on to practice law with Stone before becoming a Kansas district court judge.

== Education ==
Stone attended public schools in Topeka before attending Washburn College where he graduated with a bachelor's degree in 1889. In 1885, Stone was the captain of Washburn's first football team. This team went undefeated for nearly five years. In 1889, Stone was part of a group of young men who petitioned Phi Delta Theta to form a chapter at the college. Several years later he was an advisor to the Delta Phi Fraternity at Washburn which went on to become the Kansas Beta Chapter of Phi Delta Theta in 1910. Stone was initiated with the Chapter's founding members on October 1, 1910. In 1941, he was honored as the first-ever recipient of the Topeka Phi Delta Theta Alumni Association's "Phi of the Year" award.

Following his graduation from Washburn in 1889, Stone studied law in the offices of J.G. Slonecker, a future president of the Kansas Bar Association, and then with Frank Foster and John Murray of the firm Murray & Foster in Topeka. He was admitted to practice in 1892.

== Legal Practice ==
From 1892 to 1895, Stone practiced in partnership with Ed McKeever in the firm McKeever & Stone. Then from 1895 to 1897 with James Troutman in the firm Troutman & Stone. After leaving the Kansas legislature in 1919, he organized the firm of Stone & McDermott which became Stone, McClure, Webb, Johnson & Oman in 1923. He remained with the firm until his retirement. Stone was president of the Topeka Bar Association in 1925–26 and was elected to the board of the American Bar Association in the 1936.

Stone was instrumental in founding the law school at Washburn in 1903. The school's president Norman Plass approached Stone with the idea and put him in charge of the project. In May 1903 Stone assembled a group of local lawyers to begin lecturing without pay. In September of that year the school officially opened in rented space at 118 SW 8th Street in downtown Topeka. At its inception, the law school had four full-time professors and 23 practicing lawyers as lecturers. Stone taught for twelve years at Washburn Law in the areas of Constitutional Law as well as partnerships and insurance.

Stone specialized in corporation law and insurance and utility cases practicing before state and federal courts, including the United States Supreme Court. Among his more prominent cases was Troutman et al. v. The DeBoissiere Odd Fellows Orphans Home et al. decided by the Kansas Supreme Court in 1903, Doherty v. the Kansas City Star Company in a libel action, and American State Bank v. Walter E. Wilson, Bank Commissioner.

In his later years, Stone was best known for successfully representing the Prairie Band of the Potawatomi Tribe of Indians in a long-running legal action against the United States Government. At the time of his death, Stone had secured more than $1,000,000 for the tribe. The tribe deeply appreciated Stone's tireless efforts on its behalf bestowing on him the name "See-nees" or "Little Stone."

== Political life ==
Stone was elected to the Kansas House of Representatives in 1904 from the Shawnee County district. He served in the House from 1905 until 1919 where he was a member of the Judiciary Committee. During his tenure he was identified as an important force behind progressive legislation. A biography of Stone prepared in 1918 characterized his impact in the Kansas House this way: "His seniority of service and experience give him high standing in legislative councils and have enabled him to render so much effective influence on behalf of progressive legislation. In many ways no state in the Union has done more to conform its legislative program with modern views of social and economic righteousness than Kansas, and in this program the Hon. Robert Stone has borne a conspicuous part."

After serving as minority leader, he was elected Speaker of the House in 1915 when the Republicans retook control of the body. After leaving the Kansas House in 1919, Stone remained active in political life. He was sharply critical of the New Deal. In August 1935, the New York Times reported on an open letter that the former Speaker had written to Kansas Senator Arthur Capper. Stone did not question Capper's sincerity but thought that the senator had "unintentionally departed from Americanism and in fact endorsed socialism." Stone continued, "The NRA laws, the Wagner law, the Guffy bill and the Connery bill, and many other New Deal laws which you espouse, violate the American principle which guarantees the right of the people to self-government."

== Civic Involvement ==
Stone was active in a wide range of civic and corporate affairs in his native Topeka. He was a trustee of Washburn College from 1911 to 1941 and was chairman from 1930 to 1941 when the school was reorganized as Washburn Municipal University of Topeka. In 1926 Stone was awarded an honorary doctorate of laws from the Washburn Law School. In 1939 the school named him its "Man of Honor" for the year. In 1955, Washburn awarded Stone its Distinguished Service Award.

He was also a trustee of Ottawa University, Mount Hope Cemetery and Vail Hospital until its merger with Stormont Hospital. He was a board member of the Christ Hospital and the Topeka Salvation Army, which made him its first honorary life member. He was also active in the work of the Topeka Community Chest and City Planning Commission.

Stone was affiliated with the Scottish Rite bodies of Masonry and was a 32nd degree Mason. He was a member of the Topeka Chamber of Commerce, the Shawnee Country Club, the Shawnee Golf Club, the Topeka Country Club, Sons of the American Revolution, and the Rotary Club. He was especially active in the Rotary organization. He was one of the charter members of Topeka Rotary, was its president from July 1915 to June 1916 followed by service as governor of the Eleventh District (Kansas, Missouri and Oklahoma).

An avid collector of books on Kansas history, Stone was president of the Kansas Historical Society and the first president of the Shawnee County Historical Society.
