= Justice Schroeder =

Justice Schroeder may refer to:

- Alfred G. Schroeder (1916–1998), associate justice of the Kansas Supreme Court
- Gerald F. Schroeder (born 1939), associate justice and chief justice of the Idaho Supreme Court

== See also ==
- Judge Schroeder (disambiguation)
- Wilfrid Schroder (1946–2013), associate justice of the Kentucky Supreme Court
