= Delano Lewis =

American businessman and diplomat (1938–2023)

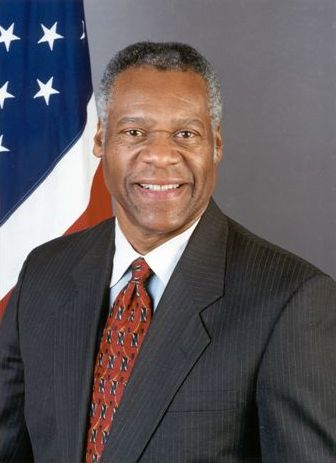
- Official portrait, 2000

United States Ambassador to South Africa
- In office January 21, 2000 – June 22, 2001
- President: Bill Clinton; George W. Bush
- Preceded by: James A. Joseph
- Succeeded by: Cameron Hume

Personal details
- Born: Delano Eugene Lewis; November 12, 1938 Arkansas City, Kansas, U.S.
- Died: August 2, 2023 (aged 84) Las Cruces, New Mexico, U.S.
- Party: Democratic
- Spouse: Gayle Jones (m. 1960)
- Children: 4, including Phill
- Education: University of Kansas; Washburn University

Delano Eugene Lewis (del-AY-noh; November 12, 1938 – August 2, 2023) was an American attorney, businessman and diplomat. He was the United States ambassador to South Africa from 2000 to 2001, and previously held leadership roles at the Peace Corps and National Public Radio. He was the father of actor Phill Lewis.

== Early life and education ==
Delano Eugene Lewis was born on November 12, 1938, in Arkansas City, Kansas, into a family of "ardent Democrats". He was named for Franklin Delano Roosevelt (although his name is pronounced "Del-AYE-no", differently than Roosevelt). He was the only child of Raymond Ernest Lewis, a porter for the Santa Fe Railroad, and Enna L. Lewis (née Wordlow), a homemaker.

Lewis attended Sumner High School, in Kansas City, Kansas, from which he graduated in 1956. He attended Boys State in his junior and senior years of high school.

Lewis graduated from the University of Kansas, in Lawrence, Kansas, in 1960, where he was a classmate of Wilt Chamberlain. He earned a law degree from the Washburn University School of Law, in Topeka, Kansas, in 1963. He worked full-time at the Menninger Clinic while attending law school.

== Career ==
After graduation, Lewis went to work as an attorney in the U.S. Justice Department and later in the Office of Compliance in the Equal Employment Opportunity Commission. He was an associate director and country director for the Peace Corps in Nigeria and Uganda from 1966 to 1969.

Lewis was a legislative assistant to Senator Edward Brooke and Delegate Walter E. Fauntroy. He led Marion Barry's mayoral transition team in 1978 and his re-election campaign's financial committee in 1982.

Lewis joined The Chesapeake & Potomac Telephone Company in 1973 as a public affairs manager, becoming its chief executive officer in 1990. In 1988, Lewis served a one-year term as president of the Greater Washington Board of Trade, and began a term as president of the newly formed City National Bank of Washington, which eventually closed in 1993.

In 1993, Lewis became the president and chief executive officer of National Public Radio. During his tenure, he served for three years on the board of Apple Computer, citing "pressing time demands" as the reason for leaving in 1997. He resigned from NPR in 1998.

Lewis was also a member of the board of directors of Black Entertainment Television, and served on the boards of Colgate-Palmolive, Halliburton, and Eastman Kodak, as well.

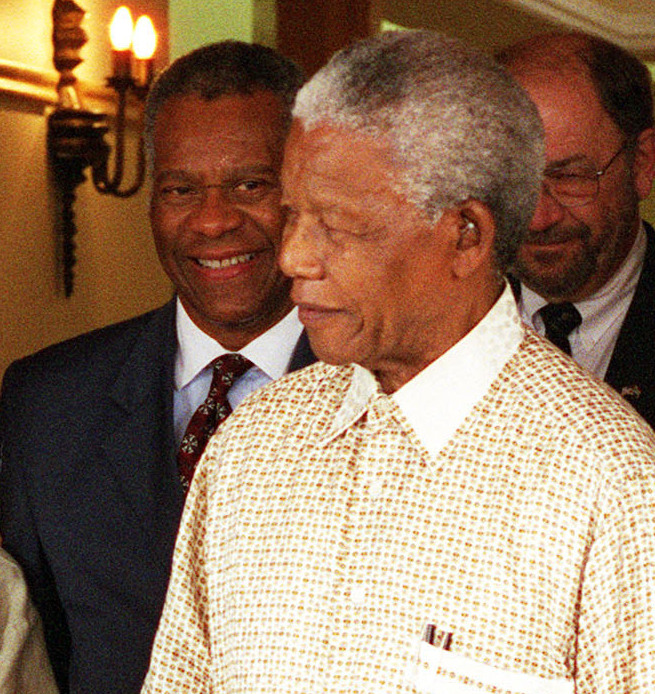
Lewis with former President of South Africa Nelson Mandela in 2000

President Bill Clinton named Lewis the U.S. ambassador to South Africa in 1999 and presented his credentials on January 21, 2000. He was sworn in by federal judge John Edwards Conway, a law-school classmate. Later, Lewis and his wife moved to Las Cruces, New Mexico, where he started a consultancy, Lewis & Associates. In 2006, he was named a senior fellow at New Mexico State University. The following year, he was named founding director of New Mexico State University's International Relations Institute.

=== Politics ===
Lewis was involved in the effort to establish home rule for Washington, D.C.; the District of Columbia Home Rule Act was adopted by the U.S. Congress in 1973. He was a chair of the home rule committee for VOICE, the Voice of Informed Community Expression, a group formed after the 1968 riots in Washington.

Lewis later ran for a seat on the Council of the District of Columbia (Washington's city council), losing to Barry. It was his only run for political office, although he was considered a leading candidate for Mayor of the District of Columbia for years, and was often described as a power broker in Washington, D.C., politics. When he resigned from NPR, he declared that he would not be running for any public office.

== Personal life and death ==
Lewis was a member of Alpha Phi Alpha fraternity and was elected president of it while at the University of Kansas.

Among the many civic awards Lewis earned, The Washingtonian named him a "Washingtonian of the Year" in 1978; he was awarded Catholic University's President's Medal in 1978, as well. In January 2009, he was celebrated as Kansan of the Year.

Lewis and his wife, the former Gayle Carolyn Jones, were married in 1960, and they had four sons, including actor Phill Lewis. A Baptist by birth and upbringing, Lewis converted to Catholicism when he married. He died on August 2, 2023, under hospice care in Las Cruces, New Mexico, aged 84.

== See also ==
- List of Washburn University alumni
- List of University of Kansas people

Political offices
Preceded by James A. Joseph	United States Ambassador to South Africa; 1999–2001	Succeeded by Cameron Hume
