= William West Harvey =

American judge and politician (1869–1958)

Chief Justice of the Kansas Supreme Court
- In office 1945–1956
- Preceded by: John Shaw Dawson
- Succeeded by: William A. Smith

Justice of the Kansas Supreme Court
- In office 1923–1945
- Preceded by: Judson S. West
- Succeeded by: Harold R. Fatzer

Speaker of the Kansas House of Representatives
- In office 1921–1923

Member of the Kansas House of Representatives from the 19th district
- In office 1917–1923

Personal details
- Born: November 21, 1869 Dickinson County, Kansas
- Died: September 27, 1958 (aged 88)
- Party: Republican

William West Harvey (November 21, 1869 – September 27, 1958) was a member of the Kansas House of Representatives and a justice of the Kansas Supreme Court from January 8, 1923, to January 8, 1945, and chief justice from January 8, 1945, to March 1, 1956.

In 1906 he set up his own practice in Ashland, Kansas, and in the same year became the Clark County attorney for one term. He then went on to be the representative for Clark County starting in 1917 for three terms, including being elected speaker of the house in his third term. June 17, 1921, he was made Assistant Attorney General, he was the third member of his family to hold the position.

Harvey stood for the supreme court in 1922 against the incumbent Judson S. West who had already served two terms. Harvey won the number 2 position with 38% of the vote, just beating West who gained 37% of the vote. In 1939 the retirement of Justice William Easton Hutchinson caused a shuffle of the court with only Justice Harvey and Chief Justice John Shaw Dawson keeping their places. He then became the Chief Justice in 1945 filling the position vacated by the retirement of Chief Justice Dawson.

Harvey resigned as Chief Justice as of March 1, 1956, before the end of his full term with Justice William A. Smith being promoted to the Chief Justice position. The vacant No. 2 position on the court was filled by Harold R. Fatzer.

== Life and education ==
He was born November 21, 1869, in Madison County, Kansas, moving to a farm near Berryton, Shawnee County, Kansas, in 1877. He graduated in 1896 from Emporia State Teachers College, going on to teach in rural schools and becoming the superintendent of Ellsworth city schools for two years. He studied law privately and was admitted in 1898 to he Kansas Bar. He owned a large ranch near to Ashland, Kansas. His had two brothers both Democrats, Alexander Miller Harvey was a Lieutenant Governor of Kansas and Louis S. Harvey a prominent Kansas lawyer who was thought to be a member of the Ku Klux Klan.

== Death ==
He died of a heart attack on the way to hospital after collapsing in his home in Topeka, Kansas, on Saturday September 27, 1958. His wife Marie had died a few years before him in 1952. He left behind a daughter Helen Righter and a son Howard S. Harvey. He was buried in Ridgeway cemetery near Carbondale.

Legal offices
Preceded by John Shaw Dawson	Chief Justice of the Kansas Supreme Court; 1945–1956	Succeeded by William A. Smith
Preceded by Judson S. West	Justice of the Kansas Supreme Court; 1923–1945	Succeeded by Harold R. Fatzer
