= Robert E. Davis (judge) =

American judge

Justice Robert E. Davis

Robert Edward Davis (August 28, 1939 – August 4, 2010) was the Chief Justice of the Kansas Supreme Court from 2009 to 2010. He was first appointed in 1993 and became chief justice on January 12, 2009.

== Personal life ==
Davis was born in 1939 in Topeka, Kansas. He graduated from Creighton University with a Bachelor of Arts in Political Science in 1961. While there, he was President of the Arts Council. He then attended Georgetown University Law Center where he was a member of the Georgetown Law Journal. He earned his LL.B. from Georgetown in 1964.

== Professional life ==
Davis began his career as a member of the U.S. Army Judge Advocate General's Corps where he served as trial counsel in the Republic of Korea and as government appellate counsel in Washington D.C. from 1964 to 1967.

In 1967 he returned to Kansas to engage in private practice in Leavenworth which he continued until 1984. Davis' first judicial post was as a magistrate judge in Leavenworth County from 1969 to 1976. He served as an attorney for the State Board of Pharmacy in 1972 and Leavenworth County attorney starting in 1981 until appointed associate district judge in 1984.

Two years later, in 1986 Davis was appointed to the Kansas Court of Appeals. In 1993, Governor Joan Finney promoted him to the Kansas Supreme Court. In January 2009 he became chief justice when Kay McFarland resigned due to state mandated age limits.

Davis also held many offices and memberships. He was a member of the Governor's Advisory Commission on Alcoholism from 1971–1976 under Governor Robert Docking, chairman of the board of trustees for St. John's Hospital in Leavenworth from 1980 to 1984, director and president of Leavenworth County Community Corrections Board in 1980–1984, director of the Leavenworth Historical Society from 1970 to 1975, general counsel and board of directors for Leavenworth National Bank and Trust Co. from 1972 to 1984, and a council member for St. Mary's College in 1984. He also served on the Governor's Adoption Reform Task Force under Governor Kathleen Sebelius and was an officer of the American Inns of Court.

Davis died on August 4, 2010, one day after retiring from the bench. He was 70 years of age.

Legal offices
Preceded by Kay McFarland	Chief Justice of the Kansas Supreme Court; 2009–2010	Succeeded by Lawton Nuss
Preceded by Harold S. Herd	Justice of the Kansas Supreme Court; 1993–2009	Succeeded by Nancy Moritz
