= Harry L. Twaddle =

U.S. Army major general

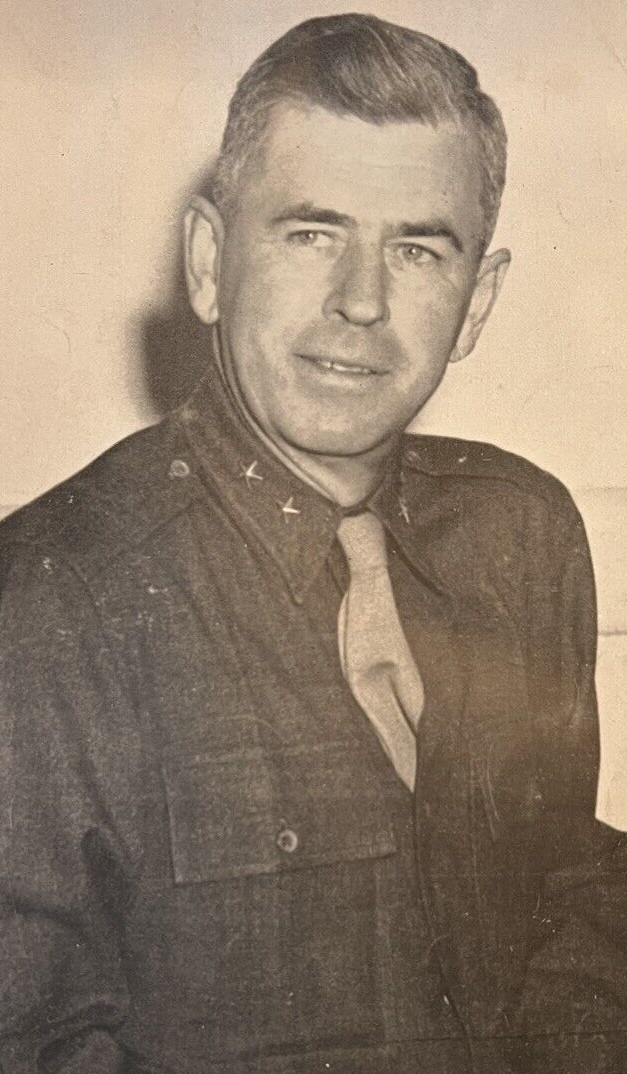
- From 1945's 95th Infantry Division Road to Victory
- Born: June 2, 1888; Clarksfield, Ohio, U.S.
- Died: December 12, 1954 (aged 66); Hammond, Indiana, U.S.
- Burial place: Arlington National Cemetery
- Education: Syracuse University
- Spouse: Sara Maud Udell (m. 1917–1954)
- Children: 2
- Military career
- Service: United States Army
- Service years: 1912–1948
- Rank: Major General
- Service number: O3280
- Unit: U.S. Army Infantry Branch
- Commands: Convalescent Center, Fort Dix; Citizens' Military Training Camp, Fort Sill; Mobilization Branch, United States Department of War; 95th Infantry Division; Infantry Replacement Center, Camp Wolters; Fort Polk
- Wars: World War I World War II
- Awards: Army Distinguished Service Medal; Silver Star; Legion of Merit; Bronze Star Medal
- Other work: President, 95th Infantry Division Association

Harry Lewis Twaddle (June 2, 1888 – December 12, 1954) was a career officer in the United States Army. He served from 1912 to 1948 and attained the rank of major general. A veteran of World War I and World War II, he commanded the 95th Infantry Division during the latter. His awards include the Army Distinguished Service Medal, Silver Star, Legion of Merit, and Bronze Star Medal.

A native of Clarksfield, Ohio, Twaddle was raised in Briarcliff Manor, New York, and graduated from Ossining High School in 1905. After graduating from Syracuse University in 1910, he worked as an electrical engineer for two years before deciding to pursue a career in the military. He passed the examination for a commission in the United States Army in 1912, and was appointed a second lieutenant of Infantry. Twaddle served in the Western United States and Alaska before and during World War I. After the war, he commanded the convalescent center at Fort Dix, New Jersey; completed several military education and professional development courses; and served in several prominent staff assignments.

At the start of World War II, Twaddle was head of the United States Department of War's Mobilization Branch, where he helped plan the Army's expansion as the U.S. began preparing to enter the war. He was then assigned as the assistant chief of staff for operations and training (G-3) on the War Department General Staff, where he planned the individual and unit training soldiers would get before combat. In 1942, he was assigned to command the 95th Infantry Division, which he led for the rest the war, including combat in Europe in 1944 and 1945. After the war, Twaddle's assignments included command of the Infantry Replacement Center at Camp Wolters, Texas.

Twaddle retired in June 1948. In retirement, he lived in Kensington, Maryland, and served as president of the 95th Infantry Division Association. He died on December 12, 1954, while visiting one of his sons in Hammond, Indiana. Twaddle was buried at Arlington National Cemetery.

== Early life ==
Harry Lewis Twaddle was born in Clarksfield, Ohio, on June 2, 1888, the son of Herbert Allen Twaddle and Sadie Arabelle (Campbell) Twaddle. He was raised and educated in Clarksfield, then in Briarcliff Manor, New York, where his father managed the dairy farm of businessman V. Everit Macy. Twaddle graduated from Ossining High School in 1905.

Twaddle attended Syracuse University beginning in 1906, where he played left guard on the football team. In 1910, he graduated with an electrical engineering (E.E.) degree.

After graduating from college, Twaddle lived in Cleveland, Ohio and worked as an engineer for the National Electric Light Association.

== Military career ==
In 1912, he passed the competitive examination that qualified him to receive a United States Army commission directly from civilian life, and he was appointed a second lieutenant of Infantry.

=== Start of career ===
After receiving his commission, Twaddle was assigned to the 14th Infantry Regiment at Columbus Barracks, Ohio. In 1913, he was part of a 1st Battalion, 14th Infantry contingent that was assigned to duty at Fort George Wright, Washington. In 1914, Twaddle was a member of Company B, 14th Infantry when it was posted to Fort Gibbon, Alaska, and Twaddle was assigned as acting post quartermaster. In 1917, Twaddle married Sara Maud Udell of Brooklyn. They were the parents of two sons, Herbert Granger Twaddle and Warren William Twaddle.

During World War I, Twaddle continued to serve as part of the Fort Gibbon garrison and participated in activities to increase public support for the war effort, including helping recruit and organize Alaska's contingent of Four Minute Men.

After the war, he was assigned to command the convalescent center for wounded and ill soldiers at Fort Dix, New Jersey. In addition to attending several army schools as a student in the early 1920s, Twaddle carried out duties including instructor and observer for units of the National Guard during their summer annual training periods. In the mid-1920s, he served on the general staff at the United States Department of War. In 1927, he was assigned to the faculty of the United States Army Command and General Staff College.

=== Mid-career ===
In the early 1930s, Twaddle was assigned to the 38th Infantry Regiment, and his duties included command of the summer Citizens' Military Training Camps held at Fort Sill, Oklahoma. When the 29th Infantry Regiment was formed at Fort Sill in 1933 using personnel from the 38th Infantry, Twaddle was assigned as the 29th's executive officer (second in command). In 1936, he was assigned to the 2nd Infantry Regiment at Fort Wayne, Michigan.

In August 1938, Twaddle was assigned to the War Department General Staff, on which he served until March 1942. As the army staff's recognized expert on individual soldier training, in July 1940, Twaddle testified to the United States Congress in support of the Selective Training and Service Act of 1940. With the U.S. anticipating entry into World War II, he estimated that if the act was passed, the United States would have 1.4 million service members in training by April 1941. In April 1941, Twaddle was reassigned from chief of the War Department Mobilization Branch to the army's assistant chief of staff for operations and training (G-3).

=== Later career ===
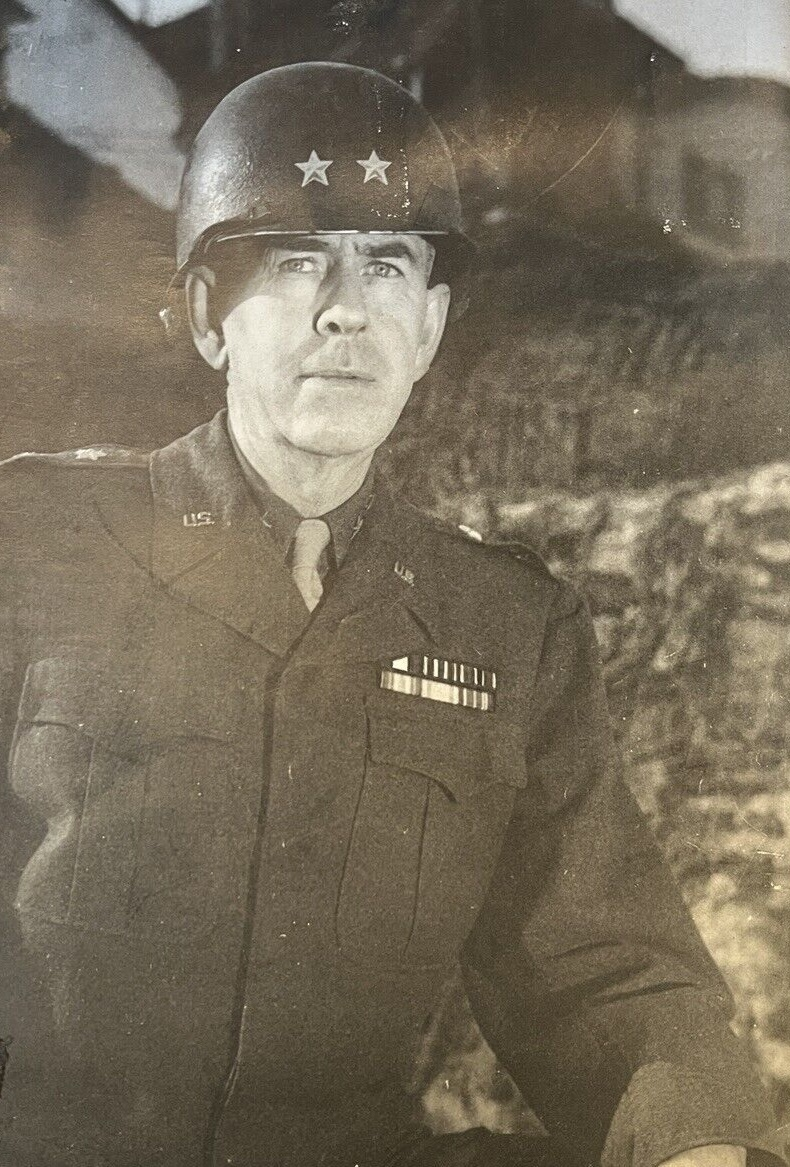
Page 2 of 1945's 95th Infantry Division Road to Victory

In May 1942, Twaddle was appointed to command the 95th Infantry Division, which he activated and led through its initial organization at Camp Swift, Texas. In December 1942, the 95th Division moved to Fort Sam Houston, where it continued its pre-combat training. After participating in the summer 1943 Carolina Maneuvers, in September the division relocated to Fort Polk, Louisiana. In early 1944, the 95th Division was posted to Fort Indiantown Gap, Pennsylvania, where it completed individual and unit training prior to departing the United States for combat in Europe.

Twaddle led the division to England in August 1944, where it underwent additional training prior to entering combat. After arriving in France in mid-September, the 95th Division bivouacked near Norroy-le-Sec, then went into defensive positions in the Moselle river bridgehead sector east of Moselle and south of Metz on October 19. The division patrolled the Seille river near Cheminot, and repulsed German attempts to cross the river. On November 1, subordinate units of the 95th Division went on the offensive, and reduced enemy positions east of Maizières-lès-Metz. On November 8, the same units crossed the Moselle and advanced to Bertrange.

The 95th Infantry Division carried out offensive operations around Metz and captured the city on November 22. On November 25, the division moved towards the Saar river, and it entered Germany on November 28. The 95th Division seized a bridge over the Saar on December 3, then engaged in close combat during the fight for the city of Saarlautern. In early February 1945, the 95th Division began moving to in the Netherlands, and by February 14 it relieved British units on the defensive near Merselo. After being relieved on February 23, the 95th Division reorganized and assembled near Jülich, Germany on March 1. Going back on the offensive, the division defeated German defenses near the Hitler Bridge at Uerdingen on March 5. Beginning on March 12, Twaddle's command established defenses near the city of Neuss. After assembling east of the Rhine river near Beckum, on April 3 it launched an attack across the Lippe river, and it captured Hamm and Kamen on April 6. After defeating German resistance between the Ruhr and the Möhne rivers, the 95th Division took Dortmund on April 13, after which it maintained defensive positions on the north bank of the Ruhr. Twaddle remained in command after the end of the war, and led the division when it returned to the United States in late June 1945. The 95th Infantry Division was preparing for combat in the Pacific War when the war ended, and it was inactivated at Camp Shelby, Mississippi on October 15, 1945.

Under Twaddle's command, the 95th Division took part in the Northern France, Rhineland, Ardennes-Alsace, and Central Europe campaigns. Its performance was recognized with numerous individual awards, including one Medal of Honor (Andrew Miller), 11 Distinguished Service Crosses, and one Army Distinguished Service Medal (Twaddle). The 95th Infantry Division was part of Third United States Army during the Battle of Metz, and German defense of the city for several months in late 1944 frustrated Third Army commander George S. Patton by significantly slowing his advance into Germany. After Metz was finally captured, the division became known as the "Iron Men of Metz," which it was subsequently authorized to use as a special designation.

After the 95th Infantry Division's inactivation, Twaddle was assigned to command the Infantry Replacement Center at Camp Wolters, Texas. In early 1946, he was assigned to command the post at Fort Polk, Louisiana. In 1947, he was assigned to the staff of Fifth United States Army in Chicago. Twaddle retired effective June 30, 1948.

== Retirement and death ==
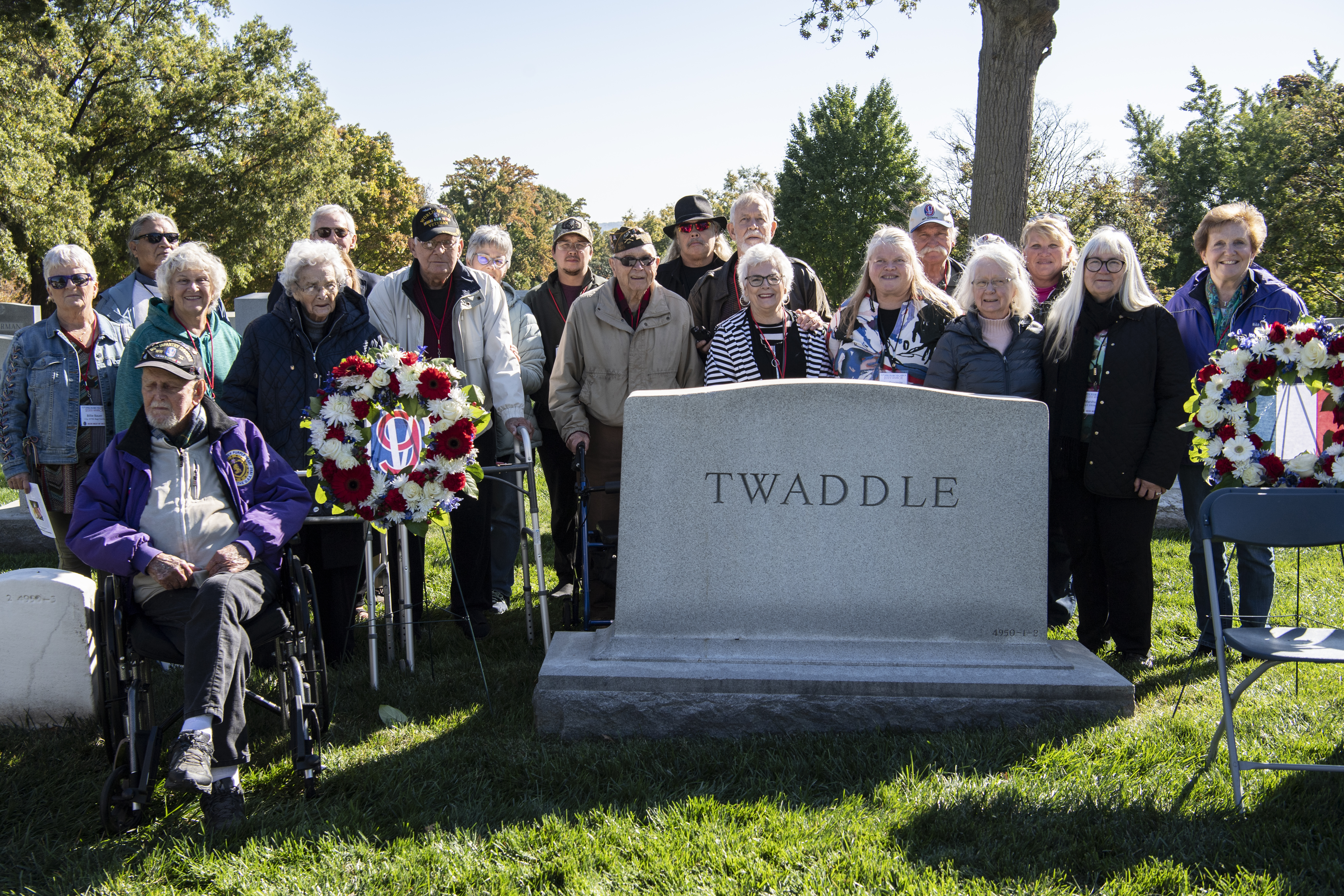
95th Division Legacy Association 72nd Reunion in Section 2 of Arlington National Cemetery on October 20, 2022.

In retirement, Twaddle was a resident of Kensington, Maryland. In the late 1940s and early 1950s, he founded and organized the 95th Infantry Division Association, of which he was elected president.

In September 1954, Twaddle was the subject of nationwide headlines after he publicly apologized at a 95th Division reunion for an incident which resulted in substantial casualties during combat. In November 1944, Company C of the division's 377th Infantry Regiment was directed to conduct a feint across the Moselle near Metz in order to conceal a real river crossing. Company C was supposed to secure a beach, remain overnight, then return the next morning. When the feint proved unexpectedly successful, XX Corps commander Walton Walker ordered Twaddle to reinforce Company C by sending the division's 320th Engineer Battalion across the river. German artillery prevented the engineers from completing their crossing, and Company C along with Company F of the engineers were left stranded and subsequently destroyed. Security requirements prevented Twaddle from immediately explaining to the survivors so that they would know they had not been intentionally sacrificed. By 1954, he decided that enough time had lapsed that he could tell the story and offer an apology.

Twaddle died on December 12, 1954, while in Hammond, Indiana to visit one of his sons. He was buried at Arlington National Cemetery.

=== Effective dates of rank ===
Twaddle's dates of rank were:

- Second Lieutenant, Regular Army, April 24, 1912
- First Lieutenant, Regular Army, July 1, 1916
- Captain, Regular Army, May 15, 1917
- Major, National Army, June 17, 1918
- Major, Regular Army, July 1, 1920
- Lieutenant Colonel, Regular Army, August 1, 1935
- Colonel, Army of the United States, October 16, 1940
- Brigadier General, Army of the United States, April 7, 1941
- Colonel, Regular Army, November 1, 1941
- Major General, Army of the United States, May 20, 1942
- Brigadier General, Army of the United States, July 1, 1946
- Major General, retired, June 30, 1948

=== Education ===
The military education and professional development courses Twaddle completed during his career included:

- Infantry Field Officers Course (1921)
- United States Army Command and General Staff College (1923)
- United States Army War College (1925)
- Field Artillery Officer Advanced Course (1933)
- Chemical Warfare Field Officers Course (1935)
- Army Industrial College (1935)

== Awards and legacy ==
=== Awards ===
Twaddle's awards and decorations included the Army Distinguished Service Medal, Silver Star, Legion of Merit, and Bronze Star Medal. His foreign decorations included the French Legion of Honor (Chevalier), Croix de Guerre with Palm, and Medal of Metz.

=== Legacy ===
After World War II, the 95th Division was reconstituted as a unit of the United States Army Reserve. In 1971, the U.S. Army began construction of a facility near Tinker Air Force Base, Oklahoma to serve as the division headquarters. Work was completed in 1974, and the site was christened the Twaddle Armed Forces Reserve Center. The Twaddle Center was a 25-acre site with six buildings, including United States Navy Reserve and United States Marine Corps Reserve structures. Twaddle Armed Forces Reserve Center was transferred to the United States Air Force in December 2012, and the 95th Division was relocated to Fort Sill, Oklahoma.

In 2014, the 95th Division Legacy Association opened the 95th Division Memorial at Fort Sill, which includes a bust of Twaddle and a commemorative plaque. A monument to the 95th Division on the Walk of Honor at the National Infantry Museum in Georgia includes two memorial benches, one of which honors Twaddle.
