= Walter G. Thiele =

American judge (1885–1968)

Walter G. Thiele (September 10, 1885 – March 14, 1968) was a justice of the Kansas Supreme Court from January 9, 1933 to January 3, 1957, and chief justice from January 3, 1957 to January 14, 1957.

== Early life, education, and career ==
A native of Washington, Kansas, he was a school teacher for several years before directly entering the University of Kansas School of Law, which he was able to do without obtaining an undergraduate degree. Thiele graduated in 1910 and gained admission to the bar that year, entering the practice of law in Lawrence, Kansas. Thiele also "served as city attorney and represented the University of Kansas on several occasions".

== Judicial service ==
Thiele successfully ran as a Republican for a seat on the Kansas Supreme Court in 1932, thereafter continually winning reelection until the state constitute was changed to make the positions appointed rather than elected. He held the sixth position of the Kansas Supreme Court until he retired and was succeeded by Alfred G. Schroeder. Thiele became the Chief Justice automatically when William A. Smith resigned before the end of his term. He only held the position of Chief Justice for a few days and was succeeded in that role by Jay S. Parker.

In 1962 he was appointed by the Kansas Supreme Court to be the commissioner to hear evidence for a case involving the petition for habeas corpus in relation to the trial of Richard Hickock and Perry Edward Smith who had been sentence to death by hanging for the murder of the Herbert Clutter family.

== Personal life and death ==
On July 26, 1911, Thiele married Maude Baker, with whom he had one son, John.

He died at the age of 82 after a short illness March 14, 1968.

Political offices
Preceded by William A. Smith	Chief Justice of the Kansas Supreme Court; 1957–1957	Succeeded by Jay S. Parker
Preceded by Edward Ray Sloan	Justice of the Kansas Supreme Court; 1933–1957	Succeeded by Alfred G. Schroeder
