= James A. Joseph =

American diplomat (1935–2023)

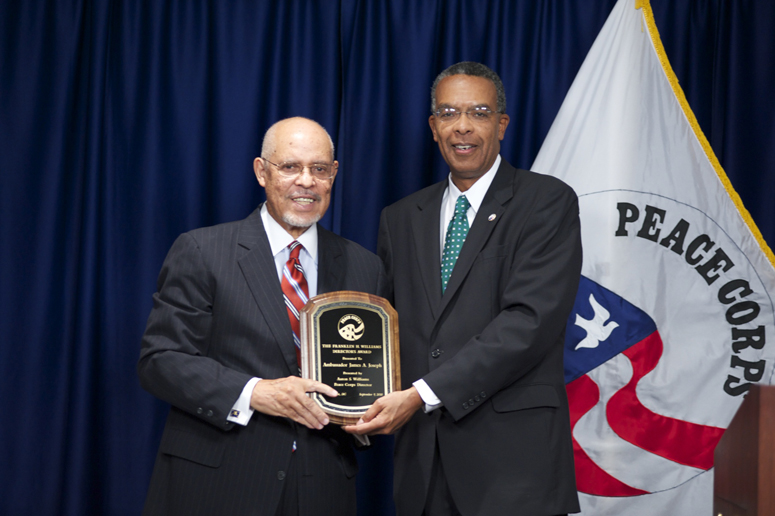
Joseph (left) receiving the 2010 Franklin H. Williams Directors Award

James Alfred Joseph (March 12, 1935 – February 17, 2023) was an American diplomat.

== Early life ==
Joseph was born in Plaisance, Louisiana. He earned his bachelor's degree in political science and social studies from Southern University, and master's degree in divinity from Yale University. He became a member of Alpha Phi Alpha fraternity. After graduating from Yale, Joseph began his career at Stillman College in Tuscaloosa, Alabama, where he helped organize the local civil rights movement in 1963.

== Career ==
Joseph served as a vice president of Cummins Engine Company and president of the Cummins Engine Foundation from 1971–1976. An ordained minister, he has taught at Yale Divinity School and the Claremont Colleges, where he was also university chaplain. From 1977 to 1981, Joseph served as the Under Secretary of the Department of Interior under President Jimmy Carter. President Reagan appointed him a member of the advisory committee to the Agency for International Development and the first President Bush appointed him an incorporating director of the Points of Light Foundation and a member of the Board of Advisors on Historically Black Colleges. President Clinton appointed him the first chairman of the board of directors of the Corporation for National Service.

From 1982 to 1995, Joseph was president and chief executive officer of the Council on Foundations, an international organization of more than 2000 foundations and corporate giving programs. In 1985, he was a distinguished visitor at Nuffield College at Oxford University and later served as an honorary professor and a member of the board of advisors at the Graduate School of Business at the University of Cape Town.

In 1994, Joseph was nominated by President Bill Clinton as a member of the Board of Directors of the Corporation for National and Community Service. The next year, he was nominated by Clinton and confirmed by the United States Senate as the U.S. Ambassador to South Africa. He was the only U. S. Ambassador to present his credentials to President Nelson Mandela. In 1999, President Thabo Mbeki awarded him the Order of Good Hope, the highest honor the Republic of South Africa bestows on a citizen of another country. As a legacy and contribution to South Africa and the United States, Joseph helped found the Emerging Leaders Program, a pioneering effort in partnership with both the University of Cape Town and Duke University aimed at identifying and mentoring the next generation of significant leaders working to make an impact on the world. He has served four U.S. Presidents.

Joseph was chairman of the board of directors of the Louisiana Disaster Recovery Foundation created by Governor Blanco, and was honored by his home state as a Louisiana Legend. The award goes to Louisiana natives who have distinguished themselves in music, art, theater, literature and politics. He has also had a distinguished career in business, education and philanthropy. Joseph was Professor of the Practice of Public Policy Studies at Duke University and founder of the United States – Southern Africa Center for Leadership and Public Values at Duke and the University of Cape Town.

Joseph was the author of three books, The Charitable Impulse, Remaking America, and Saved for a Purpose. He was the recipient of nineteen honorary degrees and his undergraduate alma mater, Southern University, named an endowed chair in his honor. The Board of Directors of the Council on Foundations appointed him President Emeritus and the Association of Black Foundation Executives established the James A. Joseph Lecture on Philanthropy.

Joseph served on the board of directors of the Brookings Institution, the National Endowment for Democracy, Africare, and the Children's Defense Fund. He served as chairman of the board of directors for MDC Inc. and remained on the board of directors as chair emeritus. He served latterly as chairman of the board of directors of the NHP Foundation. He was a director of the Management and Training Corporation and served on the board of advisors of the Kenan Institute for Ethics at Duke University, the School of Public Health at Johns Hopkins University and the Leadership Center at Morehouse College. He was also a member of the Council on Foreign Relations and the National Academy for Public Administration.

He died in Sarasota, Florida, on February 17, 2023, at the age of 87, of complications from lymphoma and kidney disease.

== Personal life ==
Joseph was married to the former Mary Braxton, an Emmy Award-winning television journalist, and had two children from a previous marriage to Doris T. Joseph.

Diplomatic posts
| Preceded by Princeton Lyman | United States Ambassador to South Africa; 1995–1999 | Succeeded by Delano Lewis |
