= Charles D. McAtee =

American lawyer

Charles D. “Chuck” McAtee
- Born: August 28, 1928; Mahaska, Kansas, US
- Died: April 28, 2005 (aged 76); Topeka, Kansas, US
- Occupations: Marine Corps officer, FBI agent, and attorney

Charles D. McAtee (July 8, 1928 – April 8, 2005) was a Marine Corps officer, FBI agent, director of Kansas prisons, attorney, and Republican candidate for both Congress and Kansas Attorney General.

== Early life ==
McAtee was born on July 8, 1928, to Lloyd M. McAtee and Grace V. Woodman. McAtee was raised two miles south of the Kansas-Nebraska border in Mahaska, a Washington County, Kansas town named by his grandfather.

The Great Depression hit about a year after McAtee was born. Their lender foreclosed on the McAtee family farm. His family was able to save the farm by raising turkeys and sheep, selling butter, cottage cheese and produce. This experience seems to have shaped McAtee's political views at an early age.

McAtee graduated from Mahaska High School in 1946 and then enrolled at Washburn University. His parents helped him financially, but he earned cash by washing dishes in the school cafeteria and at the Kansas Beta Chapter of Phi Delta Theta, where he was a member. He also worked as a clerk at Helzberg's Jewelers and used some money he had saved from 4-H projects. In 2008, Phi Delta Theta announced a scholarship for Washburn students would bear his name.

McAtee graduated from Washburn with an undergraduate degree in political science and history on June 4, 1950. He also received a second lieutenant's commission in the United States Marine Corps Reserve.

== U.S. Marine Corps ==
McAtee, who had been in the Platoon Leaders program at Washburn, said he joined the Marine reserves because he wanted to fight the spread of communism. Three weeks after he was commissioned, war broke out in Korea when the north attacked the south. McAtee, who was enrolled in law school, had to withdraw and went on active duty in October 1950.

After receiving intensive training to become a combat lieutenant, he found himself in the Pusan Perimeter in South Korea, a tiny pocket of allied troops holding out against the North Koreans. At Pusan, he joined a line company in "G-3-7" – George Company in the 3rd Battalion of the 7th Marine Regiment, 1st Marine Division.

U.S. Marine Corps flag

During one particularly intense engagement, McAtee earned the lifelong admiration of his fellow Marines. On April 23, 1951, McAtee and his 3rd platoon of 43 Marines fought and won against the Chinese and North Korean troops. The Marines had crossed the 38th Parallel to enter North Korea. His platoon was ordered to dig in on the reverse side of a ridge rather on than the crest, usually the preferred position. A regiment of Chinese troops came down on McAtee's platoon. The enemy came over the ridgeline and became disoriented because the Marines weren't where the Chinese thought they would be. McAtee coordinated fire and ran from place to place to keep the machine guns and the riflemen coordinated. Dr. Jim Nicholson, then a machine gunner in the platoon, later was quoted, “He probably should have gotten a Navy Cross." During that encounter, McAtee was wounded by mortar shrapnel in the left leg.

After the Korean War, McAtee remained a committed supporter of his Marines. He was the legal officer for 1st Marine Division Association. He was also judge advocate for the General Lewis Walt Chapter of the Marine Corps League in Topeka and judge advocate of the Kansas Department of the Marine Corps League. McAtee was president of the Northeast Kansas Korean War Memorial, which was dedicated on July 4, 2003. McAtee was also a key supporter of the Topeka High School Junior ROTC program. He was also involved in the effort to clear the names and reinstate Admiral Husband Kimmel and General Walter Short who were demoted after the surprise attack on Pearl Harbor.

== Federal Bureau of Investigation ==
After leaving active duty in 1953, McAtee returned to law school at Washburn. McAtee graduated from law school in the fall of 1955.

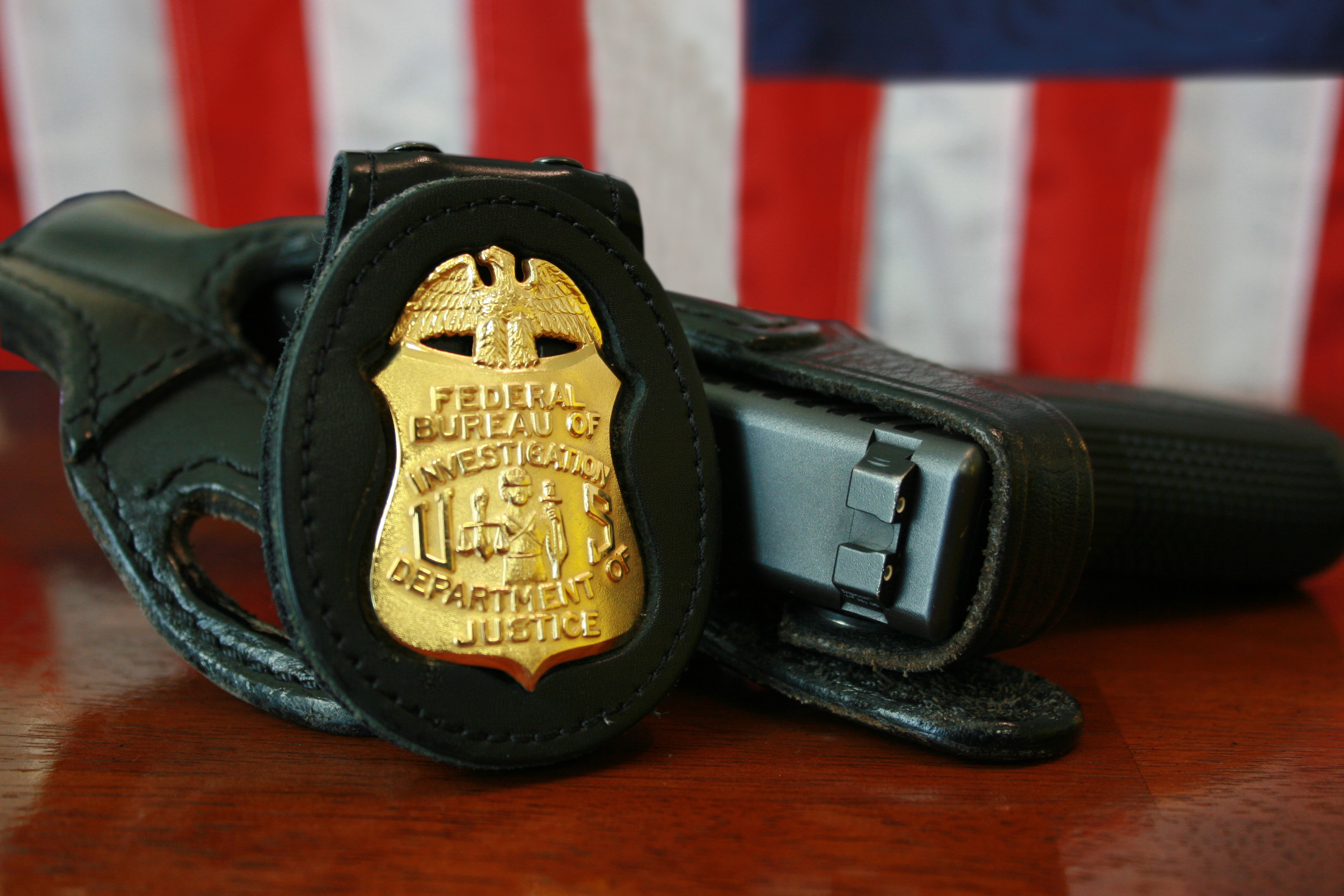
Badge and gun of an FBI Special Agent, image created by the FBI, used with permission

Upon graduation from Washburn Law School, McAtee joined the Federal Bureau of Investigation. In a Topeka Capital-Journal story years later when he was running for Kansas Attorney General, McAtee said he wanted to join the FBI because he fought in Korea to stop communism, and that war ended in a stalemate. "I wanted to continue the fight against international communism." McAtee sought an assignment in New York to work in counterespionage, but instead was sent to Texas and later Montana.

In 1957, McAtee told an FBI official he was unhappy with his assignments because he wasn't in counterespionage. Within two weeks, he got a letter of censure from FBI Director J. Edgar Hoover for his attitude and 30 days later received an honorable discharge as a captain from U.S. Marine Corps Reserve, which was arranged by the FBI against his will.

McAtee remained in the FBI until December 31, 1959, when he resigned after being assigned to become a Polish-speaking FBI agent, which would have required him to stay in bureau for another four years.

== Legal career ==
Following the FBI were stints as an assistant U.S. attorney in Kansas and the pardon and parole attorney and administrative assistant to Kansas Governor John Anderson.

In the spring of 1961, McAtee was appointed the director of penal institutions (later renamed the secretary of corrections). As director, McAtee supervised the hanging executions of four men at Lansing State Penitentiary in April 1965.

During his time as director of penal institutions, McAtee came to know Perry E. Smith and Richard E. Hickock, killers of four members of the Clutter family in Holcomb, Kansas who were slain on November 15, 1959. Smith and Hickock were immortalized in author Truman Capote's book In Cold Blood. McAtee left this position in 1969.

After serving as director of penal institutions, McAtee worked a second stint in the U.S. attorney's office in Kansas starting in 1969, this time as the first assistant U.S. attorney. He entered private practice in 1970 and was a partner in Eidson, Lewis, Porter and Haynes, a Topeka law firm, until 1989 when it dissolved. He next served as an attorney of counsel in Schroer, Rice, Wisler & Morton.

McAtee was one of two attorneys representing the Topeka school district when the Brown v. Board of Education case was reopened. After a six-week hearing in 1986 in U.S. District Court, District Judge Richard Rogers found the school district was substantially in compliance with the landmark 1954 U.S. Supreme Court decision that ended racial segregation in American schools. The 10th U.S. Circuit Court of Appeals overturned the decision and sent the case back to Rogers, who monitored it for another 13 or 14 years. Rogers then ruled the school district was in compliance and that decision was accepted.

During the course of his legal career, McAtee argued cases before the Kansas Court of Appeals, the Kansas Supreme Court and the 10th U.S. Circuit Court of Appeals and was admitted to practice before the U.S. Supreme Court. He was listed in Best Lawyers in America, under the category of business litigation, since it was first published in 1983 and was rated "AV," the highest professional and ethical rating given, in the Martindale-Hubbell directory of attorneys in all states.

== Political Campaigns ==
In the 1964 primary election, McAtee ran fourth among four Republican candidates seeking the party's nomination for the 2nd Congressional District. In the August 1968 primary election for the attorney general's office, McAtee ran fourth in a field of six Republicans. He took another stab at politics in 1972, when he again ran for the 2nd Congressional District seat. McAtee beat Joan Finney, then a Republican, in the primary election. In the general election, McAtee got 63,000 votes to Democrat Bill Roy's 101,000 votes. He ran for the Republican nomination for Kansas Attorney General in 2002 finishing third.
