= Charles Burleigh Graves =

American judge (1841–1912)

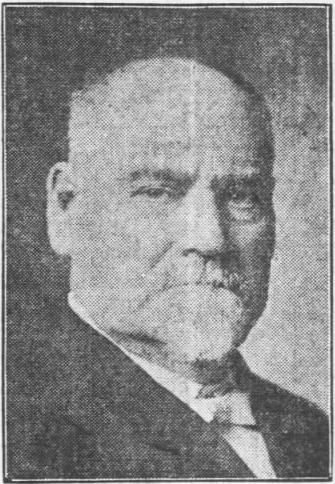
Charles Burleigh Graves photo from obituary

Charles Burleigh Graves (November 13, 1841 – March 25, 1912) was a justice of the Kansas Supreme Court from August 21, 1905, to January 9, 1911.

== Life ==
Graves was born November 13, 1841, in Wayne County, Indiana, and then at the age of ten moved with his family to Fulton County, Illinois. In 1859 he moved to Neosho Falls, Kansas.

He was a member of the Iola battalion of the Kansas artillery in the civil war, commanded by Capitan Ross, as part of the 9th Cavalry Regiment. He served with his company in Arkansas and Missouri as a non-commissioned officer until 1865 when he was mustered out. For the first year after the war he lived in Leavenworth County before returning to Woodson County to farm for another year.

He married in 1872 Miss Hattie S. Hawkins in Neosho Falls, Kansas, and they then moved to Burlington, Kansas in 1875, before later moving to Emporia, Kansas in 1883 where he resided for the remainder of his life. Together they had four sons and two daughters.

He was the president of the board of education for six years and was active in the community.

== Career ==
In 1868, he started learning law in the office of Judge H. N. Bent in Burlington, Kansas, and in 1869 he was admitted to the bar and started private practice. Later that year he was nominated by the republicans to run for a seat in the Kansas House of Representatives, but was not elected.

When Judge Watson who had personally given Graves the bar examination retired from the district court at the end of his term he invited Graves and Samuel J. Crawford to join him in a new law partnership in Emporia. The partnership only lasted a few months before being dissolved, and Graves then returned to Neosho Falls.

Graves was the city attorney for Neosho Falls and Burlington and also the county attorney for Coffey County, Kansas from November 1875.

He was elected as a district judge of the ninth district in 1880 serving the counties of Osage, Coffey, Greenwood, Woodson and Lyon, and served three terms until 1892 when he was defeated by the Populists. After he left the district court he returned to private practice in the firm of Lambert, Graves & Dickson in Emporia, later to become just Graves & Dickson.

In 1896, he stood for the republican nomination for the position of Chief Justice of the supreme court, currently filled by appointment by David Martin, but was unsuccessful and continued in private practice.

At 10 a.m. on Monday August 21, 1905 Graves got a call telling him that he had been appointed by governor Edward W. Hoch to fill the supreme court position vacated by the death of justice Edwin Wilber Cunningham. He was given the oath on September 9 and moved to Topeka, Kansas shortly after.

In a speech before the Kansas Bar Association called "Shall Jury Trials be Abolished in the United States?", Graves strongly defended the jury as imperfect but the best option available. He dismissed the idea of having an elected or appointed jury wondering on issues of selection, political bias, and the lack of assurance that those selected would possess ideal qualities. Then going on to challenge the idea that miscarriages of justice in jury trial was the fault of the jury and stated that the real cause was incompetent judges and attorneys.

He left the supreme court after losing the 1910 re-election bid where he stood along with Silas Wright Porter and Judson S. West for two positions. He returned to Emporia but his health began to fail just a year after retiring. Before his health failed he had formed a new law firm with R. M. Hamer and W. C. Harris known as Graves, Hamer & Harris.

== Death ==
He died of chronic nephritis March 25, 1912, after a paralytic stroke in January followed by ill health. His health had been bad since he was first stricken by a stroke February 24, 1911 and although his heath had improved it had not done so enough for him to work again. He was survived by his wife and several children.

Political offices
Preceded by Edwin Wilber Cunningham	Justice of the Kansas Supreme Court; 1905–1911	Succeeded by Judson S. West
