= Judson S. West =

American judge (1855–1935)

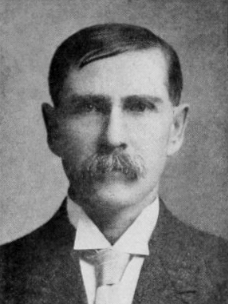

Justice of the Kansas Supreme Court
- In office January 9, 1911 – January 8, 1923

Personal details
- Born: June 28, 1855 Allegan County, Michigan, US
- Died: October 7, 1935 (aged 80) Denver, Colorado, US
- Political party: Republican
- Spouse: Mattie Nold (m. 1886)

Judson S. West (June 28, 1855 – October 7, 1935) was a justice of the Kansas Supreme Court from January 9, 1911, to January 8, 1923.

== Life and education ==
He was born on June 28, 1855, in Allegan County, Michigan, and then moved to Kansas while still a boy. He received his education at Fort Scott then becoming a teacher before going on to study law at the University of Kansas although he did not graduate.

He married Miss Mattie Nold in July 1886 in her home in Leavenworth, Kansas, before leaving to return to West's home city of Fort Scott, Kansas where they planned to continue to live.

== Career ==
He started his legal career in Bourbon County, Kansas practicing law.

He was 34 when he was elected as a judge of the sixth judicial district covering the counties of Bourbon, Crawford and Linn. He had stood against the sitting judge Stephen Haley Allen on the Republican ticket and won. He later became the assistant attorney general and the assistant United States district attorney. He had stood for attorney general in 1901 but did not win.

He first sought a position on the supreme court in 1908, while he was living in Topeka, Kansas, he was standing against three sitting justices Alfred Washburn Benson, Henry Freeman Mason and Clark Allen Smith for the Republican ticket.

In 1910, he was elected to the state supreme court, standing along with sitting justices Charles Burleigh Graves and Silas Wright Porter for two positions, with Graves losing and so retired from the court. He served until 1923 when he retired form the bench after losing to William West Harvey who opposed him for the seat.

After retiring from the court he returned to private practice first in Kansas City and then in Olathe, Kansas with Chauncey B. Little.

== Death ==
He died October 7, 1935, at his daughters home in Denver, Colorado. He had been living in Pittsburgh since health issues has caused him to retire. He was survived by his wife and four children, three sons and one daughter.

Political offices
Preceded by Charles Burleigh Graves	Justice of the Kansas Supreme Court; 1911–1923	Succeeded by William West Harvey
