= Judge Schroeder =

Judge Schroeder may refer to:

- Mary M. Schroeder (born 1940), judge of the United States Court of Appeals for the Ninth Circuit
- Robert W. Schroeder III (born 1966), judge of the United States District Court for the Eastern District of Texas
- Thomas D. Schroeder (born 1959), judge of the United States District Court for the Middle District of North Carolina
- Bruce E. Schroeder (born c. 1946), circuit judge in Kenosha County, Wisconsin

== See also ==
- Justice Schroeder (disambiguation)
