= Alfred G. Schroeder =

American judge (1916–1998)

Alfred Gustav Schroeder (June 5, 1916 – September 6, 1998) was a justice of the Kansas Supreme Court from January 14, 1957, to September 19, 1977, serving as chief justice from September 19, 1977, to January 12, 1987. He had succeeded Harold R. Fatzer as chief justice when they retired after six years in the position. He was succeeded by Kay McFarland as chief justice and Donald L. Allegrucci took the vacated sixth position on the court.

He was a district judge of the 9th district before seeking the Republican nomination for the sixth position on the supreme court currently held by Walter G. Thiele. He has also served judicial terms on the probate, juvenile and county courts.

He had served as chairman of the Kansas Judicial Council from 1963 till 1979. When he retired the council formally recognized him for his long tenure, and for his contributions

In the late 1970s and into the 1980s as chief justice, he presided over unification.

== Personal life ==
He graduated from Kansas State College and went to Harvard Law School for his law degree. He practised law in Newton for two years before enlisting and serving in World War II with the 2nd Air Corps.

Schroeder died aged 82 on Sunday September 6, 1998, at Newman Hospital, he had been raising cattle on a ranch near Madison. He is buried at the Madison Andrews Cemetery. He had a wife Katheryn, and three children John, Marilyn and Hedy.

Legal offices
Preceded by Harold R. Fatzer	Chief Justice of the Kansas Supreme Court; 1977–1987	Succeeded by Kay McFarland
Preceded by Walter G. Thiele	Justice of the Kansas Supreme Court; 1957–1987	Succeeded by Donald L. Allegrucci
