= William D. Jochems =

American judge (1886–1960)

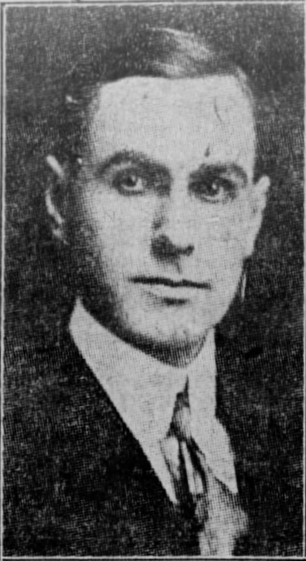
W. D. Jochems in 1918

William D. Jochems (April 20, 1886 – February 20, 1960) was a justice of the Kansas Supreme Court from January 4, 1930 to December 1, 1930.

== Life and education ==
Jochems was born April 20, 1886, in Topeka, Kansas, the son of Mr and Mrs Theodore Jochems.

After graduating from high school in Ellinwood, Kansas he moved to Emporia, Kansas when he attended the Kansas State Normal College, now the Emporia State University, while working odd jobs to pay for tuition and board. He then changed his planned career direction from teaching to law and moved to Kansas City to enter the school of law there. While at the school he worked as a stenographer for Democratic senator James A. Reed and was himself a democrat initially, later becoming a staunch Republican. He obtained his law degree from the Kansas City School of Law in 1910.

He married Helen Roetzel, the daughter of H. J Roetzel, with whom he had three sons. His first wife died in 1922 and he went on to marry Alicia Healy in 1925.

He was a Catholic and a Knight of St. Gregory, as well as the state deputy of the Knights of Columbus. He was made a Knight of St. Gregory in 1943 by Pope Pius XII.

He was also active in civic work such as being on the Sacred Heart and St. Benedict's Colleges advisory board and being a director of the Wichita Symphony Society.

In World War II he was a member of the Kansas United War Fund.

== Career ==
Jochems applied to the Kansas State Bar in 1910, while he resided in Kansas City, along with 68 other applicants. He passed the bar and moved to Wichita, Kansas.

He was selected as the assistant city attorney April 1911 at a salary of $75. He resigned the position after only a short time as he married the daughter of a member of the city commission.

In 1914 he stood for the position of County Attorney on the Democratic ticket, and lost in third place.

He was a president of the Kansas Bar Association and a member of the American Bar Association.

Jochems was appointed to the Kansas Supreme Court in January 1930 to succeeded Richard Joseph Hopkins who resigned. Later that year in the election for the remainder of Hopkins unexpired term Jochems did not stand but returned to private practice. The position was won by William A. Smith.

Separate from his legal career he also was involved with several businesses including a bank, a theater, two oil companies, and a real estate development company.

== Death ==
He died Saturday February 20, 1960 in Kansas City from a heart attack while out walking. He had the heart attack just in front of his hotel where he was staying while attending a Kansas City School of Law class reunion. He was buried in the Calvary Cemetery, Wichita.

Legal offices
Preceded by Richard Joseph Hopkins	Justice of the Kansas Supreme Court; 1930–1930	Succeeded by William A. Smith
