= K. J. Wall =

American judge (born 1970 or 1971)

Justice of the Kansas Supreme Court
- Incumbent
- Assumed office August 3, 2020
- Appointed by: Laura Kelly
- Preceded by: Lawton Nuss

Personal details
- Born: Keynen Jae Wall Jr. November 17, 1970 (age 54) Scott City, Kansas, U.S.
- Education: Kansas State University (BA); University of Minnesota (MA); University of Kansas (JD)

Keynen Jae "K. J." Wall (born November 17, 1970) is an American lawyer from Kansas who has served as a justice of the Kansas Supreme Court since 2020.

== Education ==
Wall graduated with a Bachelor of Arts in communications from Kansas State University in 1993. At Kansas State, he was an All-American and national-champion debater. Wall received a Master of Arts in rhetoric at the University of Minnesota in 1996. He earned a Juris Doctor from the University of Kansas School of Law, graduating Order of the Coif in 2001.

== Career ==
Wall began his legal career as a law clerk to Judge John W. Lungstrum of the United States District Court for the District of Kansas. From 2013 to 2015 he served as deputy general counsel to the Kansas Supreme Court, handling capital cases and special projects. Before working for the Kansas Supreme Court, Wall had been a private practice litigator in Greeley, Colorado and was senior counsel at Federated Insurance in Owatonna, Minnesota. He was a partner with Forbes Law Group in Kansas City, where he regularly represented rural hospitals and other clients in courts throughout the state.

=== Appointment to Kansas Supreme Court ===
On March 11, 2020, Governor Laura Kelly announced the appointment of Kenyen Wall to the Kansas Supreme Court to fill the vacancy left by the retirement of Justice Lawton Nuss on December 17, 2019. He was sworn into office on August 3, 2020.

Legal offices
Preceded by Lawton Nuss	Justice of the Kansas Supreme Court; 2020–present	Incumbent
