= William A. Smith (Kansas judge) =

American judge (1888–1968)

William Amos Smith (December 31, 1888 – July 21, 1968) was a justice of the Kansas Supreme Court from December 1, 1930, to March 1, 1956, and chief justice from March 1, 1956 to January 3, 1957.

== Life and education ==
Smith was born in Valley Falls, Kansas December 31, 1888 where he later attended school. He obtained his law degree in 1914 from Washburn University School of Law and was admitted to the bar that same year. He was a member of the Kansas National Guard and was called up for the 1916 Mexican border action. Later after returning to his law career it was not long before he returned to service in World War I. In 1918 he married Ada Walker with whom he had three sons.

== Career ==
His early career was as the Jefferson County attorney, but only briefly before stopping to participate in World War I. Afterwards he was appointed to the Public Utilities Commission as an assistant attorney. He then proceeded, after other roles, to become the assistant attorney general in 1922, and then on to running for the Kansas Attorney General as a Republican in 1926 which he won.

He served two terms as Kansas Attorney General (1926-1930) before joining the Supreme Court. Justice Smith has been described as a "legendary figure in Republican politics, even while on the Court." He was elected to the attorney general position on an anti Ku Klux Klan platform.

He was elected to the supreme court position vacated by William D. Jochems who had been appointed to fill the unexpired term of Richard Joseph Hopkins when they moved on to be a Judge of the United States District Court for the District of Kansas. He then became Chief Justice automatically when William West Harvey resigned before the end of his term. Smith then retired January 3, 1957 for health reasons with the spare court position being filled by Fred Hall. On his resignation he indicated that his political life was not over telling the press "don't count me out of politics yet".

One of Justice Smith's most important decisions while on the Court was issued in 1949 in Webb v. School District, 167 Kansas Reports 395, The Webb case has been referred to as one of the key cases that served as a "prelude" to the Brown v. Topeka Board of Education decision, where the U.S. Supreme Court held that the concept of "separate but equal" was unconstitutional. In Webb, the Kansas Supreme Court held that equal school facilities had to be for all children regardless of skin color. In his decision, Justice Smith described the action of the local school board to organize students into "black only" or "white only" schools as "a clear case of the school board doing by subterfuge, that is, by the arbitrary creation of an attendance district within the district itself and thereby segregating the colored children from the white children, what it could not do directly." He went on to write that "If the school district in its judgment so desire it may maintain two school buildings in the district and it may as a corollary of that divide the territory between the two schools and designate pupils from the territory who may attend one school and pupils from the other territory to attend the other schools. This allocation must be made, however, upon a reasonable basis without any regard at all as to color or race of the pupils within any particular territory. The standards and facilities for each school must be comparable. Colored and white pupils must be permitted to attend either school, depending on convenience, or some other reasonable basis."

== Death ==
He died aged 79 in Topeka, Kansas hospital on July 21, 1968, where he had been since having a heart attack in January.

Legal offices
Preceded by William West Harvey	Chief Justice of the Kansas Supreme Court; 1956–1957	Succeeded by Walter G. Thiele
Preceded by William D. Jochems	Justice of the Kansas Supreme Court; 1930–1956	Succeeded by Fred Hall
