= Clarksfield, Ohio =

Unincorporated community in Ohio, U.S.

Coordinates: 41°11′42″N 82°24′42″W

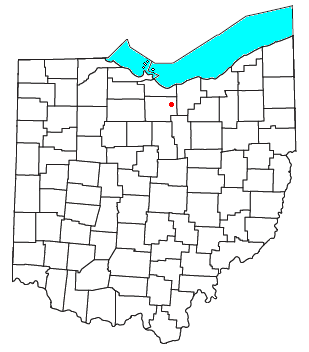
Location of Clarksfield, Ohio

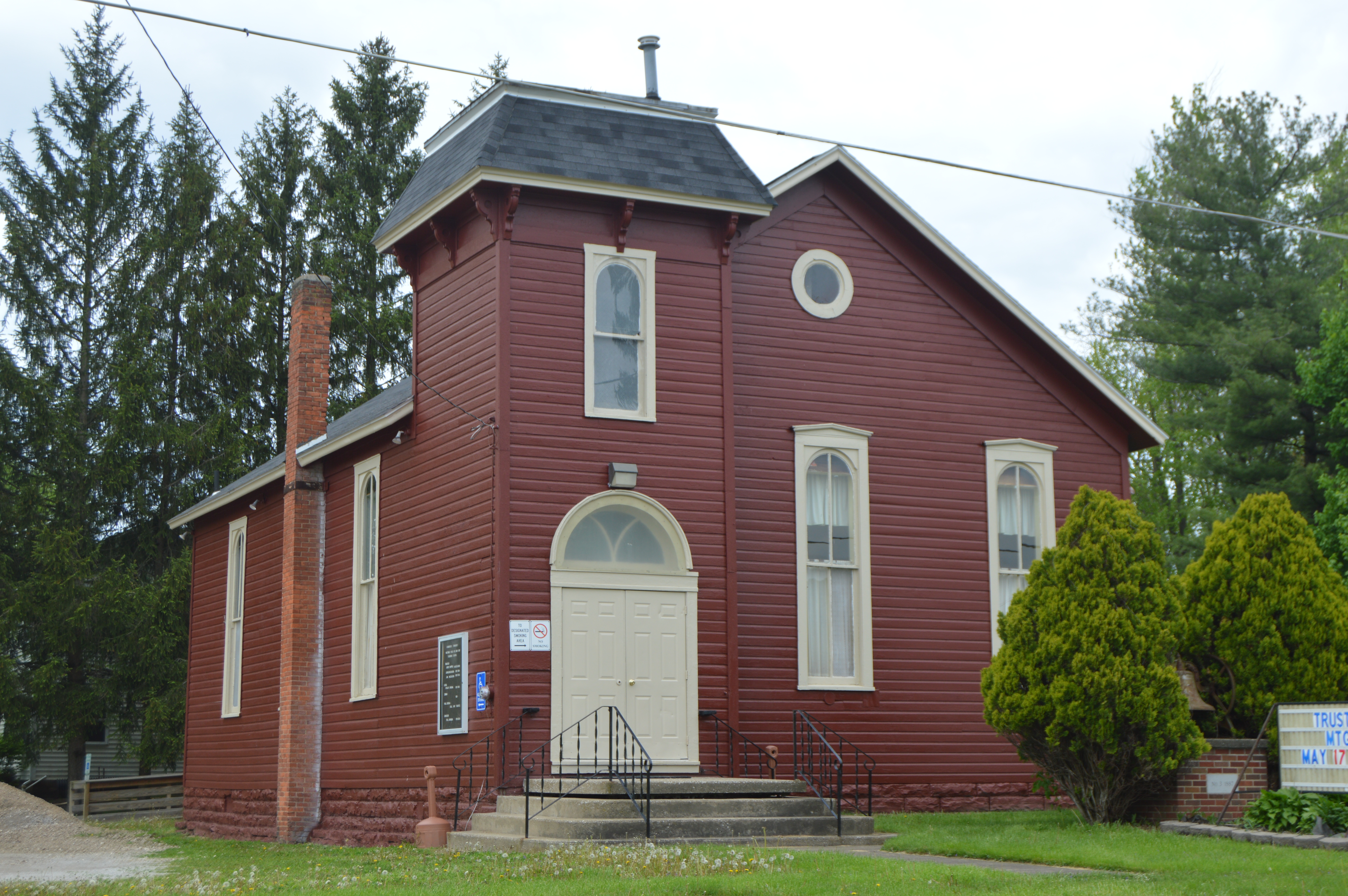
Clarksfield Township hall

Clarksfield is an unincorporated community in the northwestern portion of Clarksfield Township, Huron County, Ohio, United States. It lies along State Route 18 midway between Norwalk and Wellington, and along State Route 60 between New London and Wakeman. The Vermilion River flows northward through Clarksfield.

== History ==
A post office was established at Clarksfield in 1821, and remained in operation until 1905. The community was named after James Clark, a land agent.

== Notable people ==
- Harry L. Twaddle, U.S. Army major general, born in Clarksfield
