= Tyler C. Lockett =

American judge (1932–2020)

Justice of the Kansas Supreme Court
- In office February 11, 1983 – January 13, 2003
- Appointed by: John W. Carlin
- Preceded by: Alex M. Fromme
- Succeeded by: Robert L. Gernon

Personal details
- Born: Tyler Charles Lockett; December 7, 1932 Corpus Christi, Texas, U.S.
- Died: November 28, 2020 (aged 87) Topeka, Kansas, U.S.
- Spouse: Sue Warburton (m. 1961)
- Children: 2
- Education: Washburn University (B.A., J.D.)

Tyler Charles Lockett (December 7, 1932 – November 28, 2020) was an American judge, attorney, and jurist. He served as a Justice on the Kansas Supreme Court from 1983 to 2003.

== Early life and education ==
Lockett was born in Corpus Christi, Texas, to Tyler and Evelyn LeMond Lockett, and moved to Wichita, Kansas, at a young age. His father, Tyler "Ty" C. Lockett (1908–1960), was the Sheriff of Sedgwick County, Kansas, from 1951 to 1955. His brother Hal Lockett was a prominent Wichita attorney.

He graduated from Wichita North High School in 1951. From there, he attended Washburn law school receiving an AB degree and an LLB. While at Washburn, Lockett was a member of the Kansas Beta Chapter of Phi Delta Theta.

As a Naval aviator, Lockett spent four years on active duty in the West Pacific. He continued to fly in the Naval Reserve in the late 1960s. In 1967, he was reported to be serving as a co-pilot on a Navy Neptune patrol plane stationed at the Naval Air Station in Olathe, Kansas.

== Legal career ==
After being admitted to the bar in 1962, Lockett practiced law with the firm of Ratner, Maddox, and Ratner. From 1964 to 1966, he served as a Deputy County Attorney for Sedgwick County, Kansas. He engaged in private practice until Governor Robert Docking appointed him as a common pleas judge in 1971. In 1977, he was elected as a judge of the Sedgwick County District Court. In 1983, Governor John W. Carlin, a fellow Democrat, appointed him to the Kansas Supreme Court. Lockett served on the high court until his retirement in 2003. He continued to hear cases in retirement through 2007.

== Personal life and death ==
Lockett married Sue Warburton in 1961. She was the executive director of the Court Appointed Special Advocate in Shawnee County, Kansas, for more than a decade. and they had two sons.

He died from COVID-19 in Topeka, Kansas, on November 28, 2020, at age 87.
