= Mary Huntoon =

American artist

Mary Huntoon (born Mary Huntoon Atkinson; 1896–1970) was an American artist and art therapist. The Mary Huntoon Papers are located at the University of Kansas. It consists primarily of her personal correspondences, correspondences as director of the Federal Art Project in Kansas, original poetry manuscripts, speech and lecture notes, photographs or reproductions of her artwork, original artwork, inventories, exhibit catalogs and programs, information on employment and research as an Art Therapist at the Winter Veterans Affairs Hospital (today called the Colmery-O'Neil VA Medical Center) in Topeka, and family photographs.

Huntoon was born in Topeka. She graduated from Washburn College in 1920, after which she moved to New York with her first husband. During her time in New York, she studied under Joseph Pennell at the Art Students' League.

Huntoon resided in Paris during the interwar period. She was friends with Stanley William Hayter to whom she gave printmaking lessons in the spring of 1926. She taught Hayter the aquatint process, and the engravings the two produced around this time are comparable in their use of pure line and depiction of familiar Parisian scenes. Huntoon's first exhibition opened on 15 July 1928 at the Sacre du Printemps Gallery in Paris, and drew large crowds.

Huntoon ultimately returned to Kansas where she worked as an art teacher at Washburn, head of the Kansas Federal Art Project, a marriage counselor, and as an art therapist. She has a collection in The Newark Museum of Art, Smithsonian American Art Museum, and the Philadelphia Museum of Art.
