= Kay McFarland =

American judge (1935–2015)

Kansas Supreme Court Justice
- In office September 19, 1977 – January 12, 2009
- Appointed by: Robert F. Bennett
- Preceded by: Harold R. Fatzer
- Succeeded by: Dan Biles

Personal details
- Born: July 20, 1935 Coffeyville, Kansas
- Died: August 18, 2015 (aged 80) Topeka, Kansas
- Education: Washburn University

Kay Eleanor McFarland (July 20, 1935 – August 18, 2015) was a chief justice of the Kansas Supreme Court. She was the first female elected to a judgeship in Shawnee County, Kansas, first appointed to the state supreme court, and first to hold the title of chief justice.

== Personal life ==
Kay McFarland was born on July 20, 1935, in Coffeyville, Kansas to Dr. Kenneth and Margaret McFarland. In 1957, she graduated magna cum laude from Washburn University in Topeka with dual majors in English and history-political science. She graduated from Washburn University School of Law in 1964. McFarland died on August 18, 2015.

== Professional life ==
McFarland was admitted to the Kansas Bar and entered into private practice in 1964 in Topeka. In 1971, she was elected judge of the probate and juvenile courts of Shawnee County, becoming the first woman elected to a judgeship in that county.

In January 1973, she won election as judge of the newly created Fifth Division of the District Court in Topeka. On September 19, 1977, she was appointed to the Kansas Supreme Court by Governor Robert F. Bennett becoming the state's first female Supreme Court justice.

On September 1, 1995, she became Kansas's first female chief justice, replacing the retiring Hon. Richard Holmes. She resigned on January 12, 2009, due to state laws mandating retirement after the age of 70.

== See also ==
- List of female state supreme court justices

Legal offices
Preceded by Richard Winn Holmes	Chief Justice of the Kansas Supreme Court; 1995–2009	Succeeded by Robert E. Davis
Preceded by Harold R. Fatzer	Justice of the Kansas Supreme Court; 1997–1995	Succeeded by Dan Biles
