= John F. Kilmartin =

American retail executive

John Francis Kilmartin Jr.
- Born: 1921; Albany, New York
- Died: July 30, 2004 (aged 82–83)
- Occupation: CEO of Mervyn's Department Stores

John Francis Kilmartin Jr. (1921 – July 30, 2004) was the chief executive officer of Mervyn’s Department Stores.

== Family and education ==
Kilmartin was born in Albany, New York, and grew up in Topeka, Kansas. He graduated from Washburn University, where he was a member of the Kansas Beta chapter of Phi Delta Theta. During his junior year there he was recognized as one of the ten most outstanding men on campus with his selection for induction into the school’s Sagamore Society.

== Family ==
His first wife, Irma Lee Kilmartin, preceded him in death. His second wife, Patti survived him. In all, Kilmartin was the father of four sons and five daughters. At the time of his death, they had 17 grandchildren and four great-grandchildren.

== Retail career ==
Following service in the Pacific with the Navy during World War II, Kilmartin began a 40-year career in the retail sector. When Dayton Hudson purchased the 55 Mervyn's Departments Stores in 1978, he took the reins as the company's CEO. Backed by Dayton Hudson's financial resources, Mervyn's embarked on a remarkable course of expansion. By the mid-1980s, the chain was operating 148 stores. In 1984, Mervyn's opened nine stores in Texas — its first adventure outside the western United States — and posted a $223.3 million profit on sales of more than $2 billion. The following year, Mervyn's contributed 37% of Dayton Hudson's operating profit.

Under Kilmartin's leadership, Mervyn's was highly regarded in the retail industry in the mid-1980s, when many of its competitors for the mid-range department store customer were floundering. During this time, many of Mervyn's rivals retooled themselves, adopting many of Mervyn's best ideas. J. C. Penney, for example, abandoned its old identity as a full-line department store, and, like Mervyn's, focused on apparel and soft goods. Moreover, competitors began publishing their own tabloid advertisements, imitating the marketing tactic Mervyn's had used for decades. Perhaps most importantly, several retailers across the retailing spectrum began selling department store-quality goods at discounted prices.

Kilmartin took mandatory retirement from the company in 1986. He remained active in his retirement. He served on the boards of several retail companies and founded the Retail Management Institute at Santa Clara University.

== Community activities and tributes ==
Kilmartin was a devout Roman Catholic and a recipient of the Assumpta Award given by the Archbishop and Regents of Saint Mary’s Cathedral in San Francisco for his outstanding service and example as a Catholic layman.

Kilmartin made the pilgrimage to Lourdes five times. He was a member of the Order of Malta since 1980. He served on the Board of Trustees at Santa Clara University and the Bay Area Council and was an active member of the Capitol Club. He was a past vice-president of United Way of the Bay Area. Between 1988 and 1992, he was a trustee of the San Francisco Foundation.

At Washburn University, the John F. Kilmartin Business Leaders Scholarship Fund is named in his honor. The Silicon Valley Community Foundation established the Kilmartin Educational Fund to recognize his contribution to the community.
