= Kansas Bar Association =

Association of Lawyers in Kansas, USA

- Nickname: KBA
- Founded: 1882
- Type: Bar Association
- Headquarters: Topeka, KS
- Location: Topeka, Kansas
- Region served: Law
- Members: Approx. 5,000
- Key people: Mira Mdivani, President (2019-2020)
- Main organ: Board of Governors
- Employees: 10-15
- Website: www.ksbar.org

The Kansas Bar Association (KBA) is a non-profit bar association for the state of Kansas with its headquarters in Topeka. The KBA is made up of less than 5,000 members and was established in 1882.

== Membership ==
Any lawyer in good standing with their state's bar can join the association. Only members have the right to vote and hold positions within the association.

Membership fees differ based on an attorney's years of practice, with special consideration for certain legal fields, including legal services attorneys.

If a KBA member has been practicing law for 50 years and maintains good standing, they automatically become a life member of the KBA and don't need to pay annual dues.

The Kansas Bar Association has an elected board of governors, with the president serving as the highest position. Each president serves a one-year term, except for a few exceptions.

== Controversy ==
A former KBA executive director allegedly embezzled between $25,000 - $100,000.

== Publications ==
The Kansas Bar Association provides its members with current information about the law through publications, both print and electronic, and through social networking websites.

Print & Electronic	Electronic Only
The Journal of the Kansas Bar Association; Handbooks via the KBA Bookstore	KBA Weekly; KBA Advocate; Law Wise

== Continuing Legal Education ==
Continuing legal education (CLE) courses are required in Kansas to remain in good standing with the Kansas Supreme Court, which is required to practice law in Kansas. The KBA offers many CLEs to both members and non-members throughout the year. The Annual Meeting traditionally rotates each year to one of three locations (Overland Park, KS, Topeka, KS, or Wichita, KS). Although the locations have changed, the event has been ongoing for over a century.

== Sections ==
The Kansas Bar Association provides opportunities for attorneys to join sections of law they practice for a fee. The offered sections are listed below:

Administrative law; Agricultural law; Alternative dispute resolution; Appellate practice; Bankruptcy & insolvency law; Construction law; Corporate counsel; Corporation law, banking law, & business law	Criminal law; Elder law; Employment law; Family law; Government lawyers; Health law; Immigration law; Insurance Law	Intellectual property law; Law practice management; Litigation; Oil, gas, and mineral law; Real estate, probate, and trust law; Solo and small firm; Tax law; Young lawyers

== Politics ==
The Kansas Bar Association created a political action committee (PAC) in 2009.
