= Washburn University School of Law =

Law school of Washburn University in Topeka, Kansas

Coordinates: 39°02′08″N 95°42′19″W

- Established: 1903; 123 years ago
- School type: Public
- Dean: Jeffrey Jackson
- Location: Topeka, Kansas, U.S.
- Enrollment: 347
- Faculty: 28 (Full time) 38 (Adjunct)
- USNWR ranking: 121st (tie) (2025)
- Bar pass rate: 73.91% (2025)
- Website: washburnlaw.edu
- ABA profile: ABA profile

The Washburn University School of Law (Washburn Law) is a public law school located on the main campus of Washburn University in Topeka, Kansas. Washburn Law was founded in 1903. The school is accredited by the American Bar Association and has been a member of the Association of American Law Schools since 1905.

== Admissions ==
For the class entering in 2025, the school accepted 255 out of 549 applicants (a 46.45% acceptance rate) with 136 of those accepted enrolling, a 53.33% yield rate (the percentage of accepted students who enrolled). One student was not included in the acceptance statistics. The class consists of 137 students. The median LSAT score of enrolled students was 155 and the median undergraduate GPA was 3.68. Two students were not included in the GPA calculation and two were not included in the LSAT calculation. The reported 25th/75th percentile LSAT scores and GPAs were 151/159 and 3.37/3.88.

== Centers and programs ==
- Business and Transactional Law Center
- Children and Family Law Center
- Center for Excellence in Advocacy
- Center for Law and Government
- Center for Oil and Gas Law
- Center for International and Comparative Law

The Washburn Law Clinic functions as an in-house general practice law firm, providing representation in practice concentration areas such as Children and Family Law, Criminal Defense, State Tribal Court Practice, Civil Litigation, Criminal Appellate Advocacy, and Small Business and Transactional Law.

Under Washburn Law's Third Year Anywhere Enrollment Option, selected students can extern in the geographic area where they plan to practice after graduation (subject to limitations based on student safety and educational integrity).

== Publications ==
- The Washburn Law Journal
- Washburn Lawyer (alumni magazine)
- Washburn Agricultural Law and Tax Report

== Curriculum ==
The first-year curriculum includes Legal Analysis, Research, and Writing, Civil Procedure, Contracts, Criminal Law, Torts, Constitutional Law, and Property Law. All entering students participate in the law school's academic support program designed to teach law students the law school learning strategies they need to succeed.

== Employment ==
According to Washburns Law's official 2020 ABA-required disclosures, 79.6% of the Class of 2020 obtained full-time, long-term, JD-required employment within ten months of graduation. Washburns's Law School Transparency under-employment score is 13.3%, indicating the percentage of the Class of 2020 unemployed, pursuing an additional degree, or working in a non-professional, short-term, or part-time job nine months after graduation.

== Costs ==
In 2025, the tuition and fees at Washburn Law for three years was $86,940 for residents of Kansas, Colorado, Missouri, Texas, Oklahoma, and Nebraska and $128,430 for residents of other states, while the estimated living expenses for single students varied from $51,054 (living off campus) to $48,129 (living on campus) to $25,542 (living at home).

== Notable alumni ==
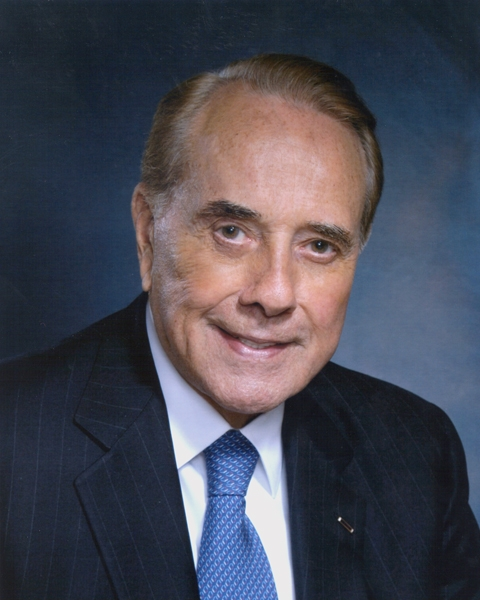
Bob Dole (LLB 1952) (deceased), Republican Party candidate for president in 1996, and United States Senator of Kansas from 1969 to 1996.

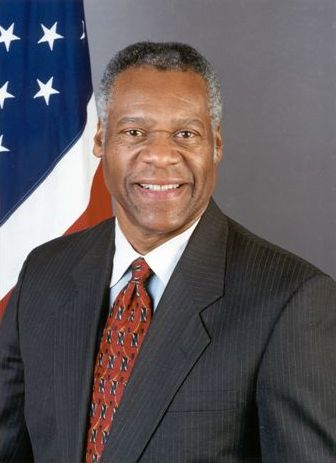
Delano Lewis (LLB 1963) (deceased), Former CEO of the Peace Corps, NPR, and United States Ambassador to the Republic of South Africa from 1996 to 2001.

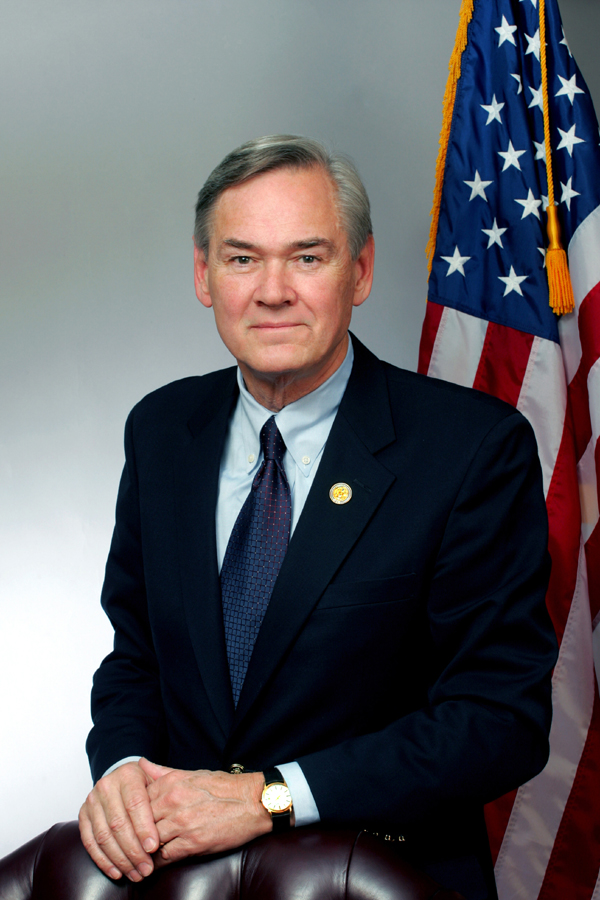
Dennis Moore (JD 1970) (deceased), United States Congressman from Kansas's 3rd District 1999–2011.

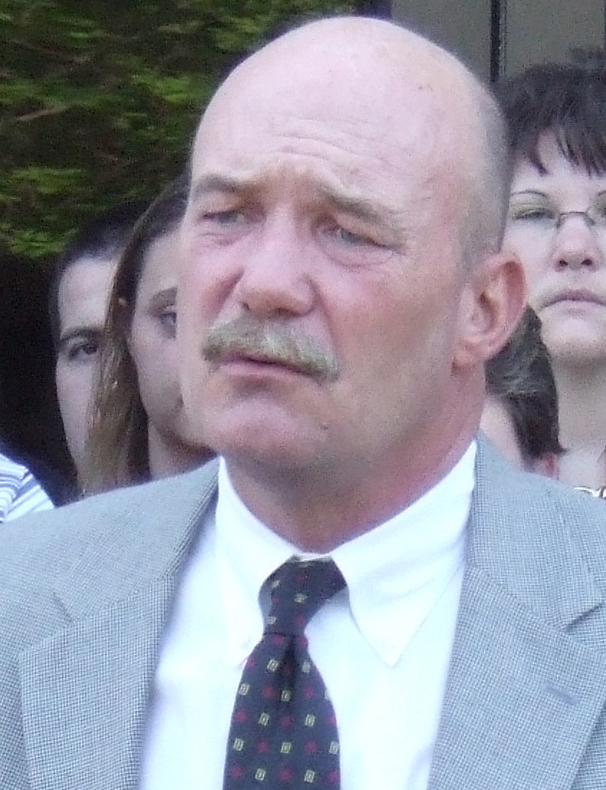
Paul J. Morrison (JD 1980), Attorney General of Kansas from 2007 to 2008.

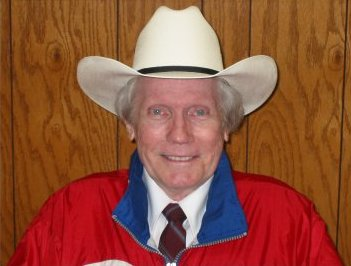
Fred Phelps (JD 1964) (deceased), Minister Westboro Baptist Church and civil rights attorney.

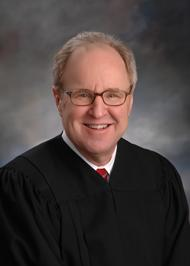
Eric S. Rosen (JD 1984), Chief Justice of the Supreme Court of Kansas.
- Kay McFarland (JD 1964) (deceased), first female justice and chief justice of the Kansas Supreme Court
- Alex M. Fromme (LLB 1939) (deceased), justice of the Kansas Supreme Court
- William A. Smith (LLB 1914) (deceased), justice of the Kansas Supreme Court
- Nancy Moritz (JD 1985), judge of the U.S. Court of Appeals for the 10th Circuit
- Bill Kurtis (JD 1966), television journalist, television producer, narrator, and news anchor
- Shirley Phelps-Roper (JD 1981), political activist
