= IEEE W.R.G. Baker Award =

- Awarded for: The most outstanding paper reporting original work in any of the IEEE Transactions, Journals, Magazines, or Proceedings
- Rewards: The award consists of a certificate and honorarium
- First award: 1956
- Final award: 2015
- Website: www.ieee.org/about/awards/recognitions/baker.html

IEEE W.R.G. Baker Award provided by the Institute of Radio Engineers (IRE), was created in 1956 from a donation from Walter R. G. Baker (1892–1960) to the IRE. The award continued to be awarded by the board of directors of the Institute of Electrical and Electronics Engineers (IEEE), after the IRE organization merged into the IEEE in 1963. Recipients received a certificate and honorarium "for the most outstanding paper reporting original work" in one of the IEEE publications, including the transactions, journals, proceedings, and magazines of the IEEE Societies. The award was discontinued in 2016.

== Recipients ==
The following people received the IEEE W.R.G. Baker Award:

- 2015 — Thomas L. Marzetta (last recipient)
- 2014 — Stephen J. Wright, Robert Nowak, and Mario A. T. Figueiredo
- 2013 — Erdal Arikan
- 2012 — Gerhard Johannes Krieger, Alberto Moreira, Hauke Fiedler, Irena Hajnsek, Marian Werner, Marwan Younic and Manfred Zink
- 2002–2011 — (not awarded)
- 2001 — Keshab K. Parhi
- 2000 — Lee Swindlehurst and Peter Stoica
- 1999 — Wayne D. Grover
- 1998 — Paul F. McManamon, Terry A. Dorschner, David L. Corkum, Larry J. Friedman, Douglas S. Hobbs, Michael Holz, Sergey Liberman, Huy Q. Nguyen, Daniel P. Resler, Richard C. Sharp, and Edward A. Watson
- 1997 — Rajiv Ramaswami and Kumar N. Sivarajan
- 1996 — Will E. Leland, Walter Willinger, Daniel V. Wilson, and Murad Taqqu
- 1995 — Petros Maragos, James F. Kaiser, and Thomas F. Quatieri
- 1994 — Michael M. Green and Alan N. Willson Jr.
- 1993 — Narasimham Vempati, Ilya W. Slutsker, and William F. Tinney
- 1992 — Alon Orlitsky
- 1991 — John C. Doyle, Keith Glover, Bruce A. Francis, and Pramod P. Khargonekar
- 1990 — Allen Newell
- 1989 — Randal E. Bryant
- 1988 — Benjamin Kedem
- 1987 — James L. Massey and Peter Mathys
- 1986 — Adi Shamir
- 1985 — John W. Adams and Alan N. Willson Jr.
- 1984 — Yannis Tsividis
- 1983 — Ryszard Malewski, Chinh T. Nguyen, Kurt Feser, and Nils Hylten Cavallius
- 1982 — Carl O. Bozler and Gary D. Alley
- 1981 — Timothy C. May and Murray H. Woods
- 1980 — David J. Allstot, Paul R. Gray, Gordon M. Jacobs, and Robert W. Brodersen
- 1979 — Stephen W. Director and Gary D. Hachtel
- 1978 — James S. Kresge, Eugene C. Sakshaug, and Stanley A. Miske Jr.
- 1977 — Manfred R. Schroeder
- 1976 — Robert W. Keyes
- 1975 — Stewart E. Miller, Enrique A. J. Marcatili, and Tingye Li
- 1974 — David B. Large, Lawrence Ball, and Arnold J. Farstad
- 1973 — Leon O. Chua
- 1972 — Dirk J. Kuizenga and Anthony E. Siegman
- 1971 — Andrew H. Bobeck, Robert F. Fischer, Anthony J. Perneski, J. P. Remeika, and L. G. Van Uitert
- 1970 — George J. Friedman and Cornelius T. Leondes
- 1969 — Tosiro Koga
- 1968 — Jonny Andersen and Harry B. Lee
- 1967 — Dean E. McCumber and Alan Chynoweth
- 1966 — Robert G. Gallager
- 1965 — Dante C. Youla
- 1964 — Donald L. White
- 1963 — Leonard Lewin
- 1962 — Marvin Chodorow and Tore Wessel-Berg
- 1961 — Manfred Clynes
- 1960 — E. J. Nalos
- 1959 — R. D. Thronton
- 1958 — R. L. Kyhl and H. F. Webster
- 1957 — R. J. Kircher, R. L. Trent, and D. R. Fewer
