= Hawaii International Conference on System Sciences =

Annual multi-disciplinary conference

- Abbreviation: HICSS
- Discipline: Information Systems and Information Technology

Publication details
- Publisher: University of Hawaii at Manoa, Association for Information Systems IEEE Computer Society Press
- History: 1968–
- Frequency: annual
- Website: www.hicss.org

The Hawaii International Conference on System Sciences (HICSS) is an annual conference for Information Systems and Information Technology academics and professionals sponsored by the University of Hawaii at Manoa's Shidler College of Business. The conference provides a platform for panel discussions and the presentation of peer-reviewed information systems research papers.

The first HICSS conference took place in 1968 at the University of Hawaii, with the goal to promote collaborative research on computer science, information technology, and telecommunications. Notably, the first six annual meetings focused primarily on various scientific issue related to the design, development, use and implementation of the ARPANET, the precursor of the Internet. Norman Abramson and Franklin Kuo, co-founders of HICSS, used HICSS platform to launch the ALOHAnet, that was subsequently employed in the Ethernet cable based network in the 1970s, and following regulatory developments in the early 1980s it became possible to use the ALOHA random-access techniques in both Wi-Fi and in mobile telephone networks.

From 1968 to 1989, HICSS proceedings were published by Western Periodicals Company, California. As the conference grew and focused more on the development, design, implementation, use and evaluation of information technologies in a wide spectrum of applications, in particular in business, HICSS worked with the IEEE Computer Society for its proceedings under the leadership of Ralph Sprague Jr. and Tung Bui, conference co-chairs. Starting in 2017, all HICSS publications have been archived and disseminated at no cost to all readers worldwide through ScholarSpace. They have also been made available in the digital library of the Association for Information Systems (AIS). With this move, HICSS has become the leading source for scientific dissemination -- more than 3.5 million paper downloads since HICSS-50 and growing.

Researchers from the University of Washington, Seattle helped create a visualization of HICSS scientific influence over time. The scholar visualization tool shows the influence a central collection of publications has had across different fields, telling the story of how this influence has developed over time.

According to Microsoft Academic in 2021, in terms of citations, HICSS has ranked first among information systems as well as business conferences and overall, ranked 37th among all conferences indexed by Microsoft Academic. HICSS H-Index reported by SCImago Journal Rank in 2022 was 92, significantly higher than the average H-Index reported in the same year for information systems journals and comparable with top Information Systems journals (e.g., compared with Information Systems Journal with H-Index of 94).

== HICSS Conferences ==
Past and future HICSS conferences include:

Year	Name	Island	Place
2028	HICSS-61	Oahu	Hilton Hawaiian Village Waikiki Beach Resort, Honolulu
2027	HICSS-60	Big Island	Hilton Waikoloa Village Resort, Waikoloa Village
2026	HICSS-59	Maui	Hyatt Regency Resort, Lahaina
2025	HICSS-58	Big Island	Hilton Waikoloa Village Resort, Waikoloa Village
2024	HICSS-57	Oahu	Hilton Hawaiian Village Waikiki Beach Resort, Honolulu
2023	HICSS-56	Maui	Hyatt Regency Resort, Lahaina
2022	HICSS-55		Virtual due to COVID-19
2021	HICSS-54		Virtual due to COVID-19
2020	HICSS-53	Maui	The Grand Wailea Resort Hotel & Spa, Wailea
2019	HICSS-52	Maui	The Grand Wailea Resort Hotel & Spa, Wailea
2018	HICSS-51	Big Island	Hilton Waikoloa Village Resort, Waikoloa Village
2017	HICSS-50	Big Island	Hilton Waikoloa Village Resort, Waikoloa Village
2016	HICSS-49	Kauai	The Grand Hyatt Kauai Resort & Spa, Koloa
2015	HICSS-48	Kauai	The Grand Hyatt Kauai Resort & Spa, Koloa
2014	HICSS-47	Big Island	Hilton Waikoloa Village Resort, Waikoloa Village
2013	HICSS-46	Maui	The Grand Wailea Resort Hotel & Spa, Wailea
2012	HICSS-45	Maui	The Grand Wailea Resort Hotel & Spa, Wailea
2011	HICSS-44	Kauai	The Grand Hyatt Kauai Resort & Spa, Koloa
2010	HICSS-43	Kauai	The Grand Hyatt Kauai Resort & Spa, Koloa
2009	HICSS-42	Big Island	Hilton Waikoloa Village Resort, Waikoloa Village
2008	HICSS-41	Big Island	Hilton Waikoloa Village Resort, Waikoloa Village
2007	HICSS-40	Big Island	Hilton Waikoloa Village Resort, Waikoloa Village
2006	HICSS-39	Kauai	Hyatt Regency, Koloa
2005	HICSS-38	Big Island	Hilton Waikoloa Village Resort, Waikoloa Village
2004	HICSS-37	Big Island	Hilton Waikoloa Village Resort, Waikoloa Village
2003	HICSS-36	Big Island	Hilton Waikoloa Village Resort, Waikoloa Village
2002	HICSS-35	Big Island	Hilton Waikoloa Village Resort, Waikoloa Village
2001	HICSS-34	Maui	Outrigger Wailea Resort, Wailea
2000	HICSS-33	Maui	Outrigger Wailea Resort, Wailea
1999	HICSS-32	Maui	Aston Wailea Resort, Wailea
1998	HICSS-31	Big Island	The Orchid at Mauna Lani, Kohala Coast
1997	HICSS-30	Maui	Wailea
1996	HICSS-29	Maui	Wailea
1995	HICSS-28	Maui	Maui Intercontinental Resort, Kihei
1994	HICSS-27	Maui	Maui Intercontinental Resort, Kihei
1993	HICSS-26	Maui	Maui Intercontinental Resort, Kihei
1992	HICSS-25	Kauai	Stouffer Waiohai Beach Resort, Koloa
1991	HICSS-24	Kauai	
1990	HICSS-23	Big Island	Kona Surf Resort, Kailua-Kona
1989	HICSS-22	Big Island	Kona Surf Resort, Kailua-Kona
1988	HICSS-21	Big Island	Kona Surf Resort, Kailua-Kona
1987	HICSS-20	Big Island	Kona Surf Resort, Kailua-Kona
1986	HICSS-19	Oahu	Westin Ilikai Hotel, Honolulu
1985	HICSS-18	Oahu	Westin Ilikai Hotel, Honolulu
1984	HICSS-17	Oahu	Westin Ilikai Hotel, Honolulu
1983	HICSS-16	Oahu	Ilikai Hotel, Honolulu
1982	HICSS-15	Oahu	Ilikai Hotel, Honolulu
1981	HICSS-14	Oahu	Ilikai Hotel, Honolulu
1980	HICSS-13	Oahu	Ilikai Hotel, Honolulu
...			
1968	HICSS-1	Oahu	University of Hawaii

== Notable people ==
=== Founders ===
The conference was co-founded in 1968 by Norman Abramson and Franklin F. Kuo. Kuo served as the first conference chair.

=== Keynote and plenary speakers ===
HICSS has featured several notable presentations, keynote and plenary addresses by researchers and practitioners in technology, computing, information systems, and related fields. Selected speakers include Guy Kawasaki, Ajit Pai, Werner Vogels, Doug Cutting, Cynthia Breazeal, Ben Shneiderman, Hal Abelson, Ian Foster, Lawrence Lessig, Lotfi A. Zadeh, Arno Allan Penzias, Edward H. Shortliffe, Don Norman, Lindsay Grace, Raj Reddy, Niklaus Wirth, Douglas Engelbart, Barbara Liskov, Tony Hoare, Edgar F. Codd, Larry Roberts, Siddhartha Paul Tiwari, Stewart Udall, and Richard E. Bellman.

== See also ==
- Pacific Disaster Center
- Systems engineering
- Futures techniques
