= Krieger (surname) =

Krieger is a German surname literally meaning "warrior", "mercenary soldier", from "Krieg", 'war'. Notable people with the surname include:

== People ==
- Adam Krieger (1634–1666), German Baroque composer
- Albert Krieger (1923–2020), American attorney
- Ali Krieger (born 1984), American soccer player
- Andreas Krieger (born 1966), German athlete
- Andreas Frederik Krieger (1817–1893), Danish politician
- Byron Krieger (1920–2015), American Olympic fencer
- Cornell Krieger, American soccer player
- DJ Krieger (born 1977), stage name of German men's rights activist Philipp Tanzer
- Earl Krieger (1896–1960), American college sports coach
- Eduard Krieger (1946–2019), Austrian footballer
- Eduardo Krieger (born 1928), Brazilian physician
- Gerhard Johannes Krieger, German engineer
- Hans Krieger (1933–2023), German writer
- Harold G. Krieger (1926–1995), American politician and judge
- Helmut Krieger (born 1958), Polish shot putter
- Henry Krieger (born 1945), American composer
- Holly Krieger, American mathematician
- Johan Cornelius Krieger (1683–1755), Danish architect
- Johann Krieger (1651–1735), German Baroque composer and brother to Johann Philipp
- Johann Nepomuk Krieger (1865–1902), Bavarian selenographer
- Johann Philipp Krieger (1649–1725), German Baroque composer
- Joseph Krieger (born 1986), Australian-rules footballer
- Kurt Krieger (1926–1970), Austrian-American baseball player
- Leonard Krieger (1918-1990), American historian
- Louis Charles Christopher Krieger (1873–1940) American mycologist and illustrator
- Luis MacGregor Krieger (1918–1997), Mexican architect
- Lukas Krieger (born 1987), German politician
- Margaret Krieger (c. 1724–1790), American tried in Vermont's only recorded witch trial
- Martin Harvey Krieger (born 1944), American physicist and professor of urban planning and public policy
- Mike Krieger (born 1986), Brazilian-American entrepreneur and Instagram co-founder
- Murray Krieger (1923–2000), American literary critic
- Pascal Krieger (born 1945), Swiss martial artist
- Peter Krieger (1929–1981), German footballer
- Peter Krieger (born 1993), American ice hockey player
- Robby Krieger (born 1946), American guitarist
- Solly Krieger (1909–1964), American boxer
- Tyler Krieger (born 1994), American baseball player
- Ulrich Krieger (born 1962), German musician
- Wolfgang Krieger (born 1940), German mathematician

== Fictional characters ==
- Artix von Krieger, a character from multiple Artix Entertainment video games.
- Courtney A. Krieger, a character from G.I. Joe: A Real American Hero
- Dr. Algernop Krieger, head of the ISIS applied research department in Archer (TV series)
- Franz Krieger, the secondary antagonist of the 1996 spy action thriller film Mission: Impossible
- Col. Von Krieger a character from The Long Long Holiday
