= Thomas F. Quatieri =

American electrical engineer

- Citizenship: American
- Education: Tufts University; MIT
- Known for: Speech signal processing
- Awards: IEEE Signal Processing Society Senior Award (1990, 1994); IEEE W.R.G. Baker Award (1995); IEEE Fellow (1999)
- Scientific career
- Fields: Digital signal processing Speaker recognition
- Workplaces: MIT Lincoln Laboratory
- Thesis: Phase estimation with application to speech analysis-synthesis (1980)
- Doctoral advisor: Alan V. Oppenheim

Thomas Francis Quatieri Jr. is an American electrical engineer and Senior Technical Staff member at the MIT Lincoln Laboratory. He is recognized for his contributions in speech signal processing, in conjunction with Petros Maragos and James Kaiser (with whom he won the 1995 IEEE W.R.G. Baker Award), by using the discrete Fourier transform to examine energy modulation in speech waveforms. In 1999 he was elected a Fellow of the IEEE "for contributions to sinusoidal speech and audio modeling and nonlinear signal processing".

== Biography ==
He attended Tufts University for his bachelor's degree, graduating summa cum laude in 1973. He then received SM, EE, and ScD degrees from the Massachusetts Institute of Technology in 1975, 1977, and 1979, respectively. He joined MIT Lincoln Laboratory in 1980 and holds an affiliate faculty position in the Harvard–MIT Division of Health Sciences and Technology. He developed MIT's graduate course in digital speech processing and is a member of Sigma Xi, Tau Beta Pi, Eta Kappa Nu, and the Acoustical Society of America.

== Books ==
- Quatieri, Thomas F. (2001). Discrete-Time Speech Signal Processing: Principles and Practice. Upper Saddle River, NJ: Prentice Hall. ISBN 0-13-242942-X.
