= Alan N. Willson Jr. =

Alan N. Willson Jr. (born 1939) is the Distinguished Emeritus Professor and Charles P. Reames Chair of Electrical Engineering at University of California, Los Angeles, mainly, working with digital signs and systems processing, and also a published author, being held in 262 libraries, the highest held being in 252 libraries.

Wilson earned his undergraduate degree at Georgia Tech and his Ph.D. at Syracuse University.

== Awards ==
He has been given numerous awards and honors including:

- member of the National Academy of Engineering
- Fellow of the Institute of Electrical and Electronics Engineers (IEEE),
- IEEE Vitold Belevitch Award
- IEEE Mac Van Valkenburg Award
- IEEE Walter Ransom Gail Baker Award
- George Westinghouse Award
- IEEE Gustav Robert Kirchhoff Award - 2018
