= Kriger =

Kriger may refer to:

- Spelling variant of surname Krieger
  - Aleksandr Kriger(1848-1917) - Russian naval figure, vice-admiral (1903), commander of the Black Sea Fleet
  - Viktorina Kriger (1893-1978), Russian and Soviet ballerina
  - Vladimir Kriger, Soviet actor
- "Kriger", track on Xtra (EP)
- Kriger original Dutch title of Warrior (miniseries)
