= Stephen Yau =

Stephen Yau may refer to:

- Stephen Shing-Toung Yau (born 1952), American mathematician
- Stephen Sik-Sang Yau, American computer scientist
