= Mac Van Valkenburg =

American electrical engineer and university professor

- Born: October 5, 1921; Union, Utah, US
- Died: March 19, 1997 (aged 75); Orem, Utah, US
- Education: University of Utah (BS); Massachusetts Institute of Technology (MS); Stanford University (PhD)
- Scientific career
- Fields: Electrical engineering
- Workplaces: University of Illinois at Urbana-Champaign; Princeton University
- Thesis: Polarization and fading studies of meteoric radio echoes (1952)
- Doctoral advisor: Oswald Garrison Villard, Jr.
- Other academic advisors: John G. Trump (MS)
- Doctoral students: Donald L. Bitzer; Leon O. Chua; Jose B. Cruz Jr.; King-Sun Fu; S. L. Hakimi; Franklin Kuo; Steven B. Sample; Stephen Sik-Sang Yau

Mac Elwyn Van Valkenburg (October 5, 1921–March 19, 1997) was an American electrical engineer and university professor. He wrote seven textbooks and numerous scientific publications.

== Early life and education ==
Van Valkenburg was born in Union, Utah. He graduated from the University of Utah in 1943 with a Bachelor's degree in electrical engineering, received a master's degree in electrical engineering from the Massachusetts Institute of Technology in 1946 under the supervision of John G. Trump, and a PhD in electrical engineering from Stanford University in 1952, under advisor Oswald Garrison Villard Jr.

== Career ==
Van Valkenburg was a professor at the University of Illinois from 1955 to 1966, then joined Princeton University as professor and head of electrical engineering until 1974, when he returned to UIUC. He received an endowed position, the W. W. Grainger Professorship, in 1982, and became Dean of the College of Engineering in 1984.

Van Valkenburg was author of seven textbooks and numerous scientific publications. He died in Orem, Utah at the age of 75.

== Awards and memberships ==
- Member of the National Academy of Engineering
- The Lamme Medal, the highest honor of the American Society for Engineering Education
- The IEEE Centennial Medal in 1984
- The ASEE George Westinghouse Award (1963)
- The IEEE Education Medal (1972)
- Halliburton Engineering Education Leadership Award of the College of Engineering at the University of Illinois.

The IEEE Education Society offers an annual Mac Van Valkenburg Early Career Teaching Award. UIUC established the M. E. Van Valkenburg Graduate Research Award in 1990.

His PhD students have included:

- Leon O. Chua ('64; IEEE Fellow and Professor in the electrical engineering and computer sciences department at the University of California, Berkeley, considered to be the father of nonlinear circuit theory and cellular neural networks)
- Prof. VGK Murti (Prof. and Dean at the Indian Institute of Technology, Madras, India)
- Franklin Kuo ('58; Prof. at the University of Hawai'i), who was instrumental in the development of the ALOHA protocol
- Jose B. Cruz Jr. ('59; control theorist and Prof. at Ohio State University)
- King-Sun Fu ('59; founding president of the International Association for Pattern Recognition and Prof. at Purdue University)
- S. L. Hakimi ('59; mathematician at Northwestern University)
- Shlomo Karni ('60; Prof. at the University of New Mexico, founding dean of engineering at Tel Aviv University '70)
- Steven B. Sample ('65; President of University of Southern California).
