= Narsingh Deo =

American computer scientist (1936–2023)

- Born: 2 January 1936
- Died: 13 January 2023 (aged 87); Winter Park, Florida, U.S.
- Occupation: Computer scientist

Narsingh Deo (2 January 1936 – 13 January 2023) was an Indian-American computer scientist. He served as a professor and the Charles N. Millican Endowed Chair of the Department of Computer Science, University of Central Florida. Deo received his Ph.D. for his dissertation 'Topological Analysis of Active Networks and Generalization of Hamiltonian tree' from Northwestern University, IL., in 1965; S. L. Hakimi was his adviser. He was professor at the Indian Institute of Technology, Kanpur. Deo died in Winter Park, Florida on 13 January 2023, at the age of 87.

== Books ==
- Graph Theory with Application to Engineering and Computer Science, Prentice-Hall, Englewood Cliffs, N.J., 1974, 480 pages.
- Combinatorial Algorithms: Theory and Practice (with E.M. Reingold and J. Nievergelt), Prentice-Hall, Englewood Cliffs, NJ., 1977, 433 pages.
- System Simulation with Digital Computers, Prentice-Hall, Englewood Cliffs, N.J., 1979, 200 pages.
- Discrete Optimization Algorithms: With Pascal Programs (with M.M. Syslo and J. S. Kowalik), Prentice-Hall, Englewood Cliffs, N.J., 1983, 542 pages.
