= Stewart E. Miller =

American electrical engineer (1918–1990)

Stewart E. Miller (September 1, 1918 – February 27, 1990) was a noted American pioneer in microwave and optical communications.

Miller was born in Milwaukee, Wisconsin, attended high school in Wauwatosa, Wisconsin, and three years at the University of Wisconsin–Madison before transferring to the Massachusetts Institute of Technology, where in 1941 he received his S.B. and S.M. degrees in engineering. He joined Bell Labs to work on microwave radar, and became technical lead for the B-29's X-band (3 cm) radar microwave plumbing. After World War II, he was instrumental in AT&T's L-3 coaxial cable carrier systems, then transferred to the Radio Research Department where he made advances in many millimeter-wave components.

In the early 1960s, Miller was the first to recognize the potential of optical communications and as director of Guided Wave Research, initiated a program to investigate a variety of periodic lens systems. As optical fiber was developed in the late 1960s, he demonstrated its utility, and also proposed the combining multiple optical components on one semiconductor chip. He became director of Lightwave Research in 1980, retired in 1983, and then consulted at Bellcore (now Telcordia Technologies) analyzing semiconductor lasers.

Miller held some 80 patents and was a member of the National Academy of Engineering, a Life Fellow of the IEEE, and a Fellow of the American Association for the Advancement of Science and the Optical Society of America. He received the Naval Ordnance Development Award in 1945, the 1972 IEEE Morris N. Liebmann Memorial Award, the 1975 IEEE W.R.G. Baker Prize (with Tingye Li and E.A.J. Marcatili), the Franklin Institute's 1977 Stuart Ballantine Medal, and the 1989 John Tyndall Award of the IEEE Lasers and Electro-Optics Society for distinguished contributions to fiber optics technology.
