= Enrique Marcatili =

Argentine-American physicist (1925–2021)

Enrique A. J. Marcatili (born July 22, 1925, in Villa María Córdoba, Argentina - died January 19, 2021, in N.J.) was an Argentine-American physicist. Together with Stewart E. Miller and Tingye Li, all of Bell Laboratories in Holmdel Township, New Jersey, he was winner of the IEEE's Baker Prize in 1975. Marcatili has been described as "a pioneer in optical fiber research," and he was a member of the National Academy of Engineering.

Marcatili was a resident of Rumson, New Jersey.
