= Paul F. McManamon =

American scientist (born 1946)

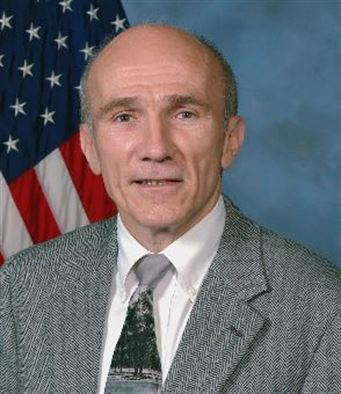
McManamon, Chief Scientist (retired), US Air Force

Paul F. McManamon (born July 1, 1946) is an American scientist who is best known for his work in optics and photonics, as well as sensors, countermeasures, and directed energy.

== Early life and education ==
McManamon was born in University Heights, a suburb of Cleveland, Ohio. He attended St Ignatius High School, where he has been recognized as a distinguished graduate. He received his BS in physics from John Carroll University his MS and PhD in physics from the Ohio State University.

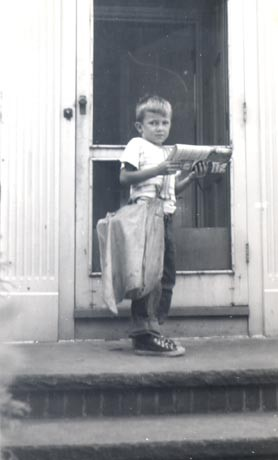
Paul delivering a newspaper while in 3rd grade

== Government career ==
McManamon spent his government career at Wright-Patterson AFB. He started in electronic warfare and then moved into optical systems while he worked on his PhD. He moved from the Aeronautical Systems Division to the Air Force labs in 1979. Initially, he was in charge of the thermal imaging group of about 14 people in the Avionics lab. In 1995, he became the acting chief scientist for avionics, a position he held for 32 months. In 2001, he became senior scientist for electro-optical sensors and, in 2005, he became chief scientist for sensors, as part of the Air Force Research Laboratory.

McManamon is widely recognized as the Father of the Optical Phased Array technology. Starting from 1987, he developed the technologies required to steer laser beams with no moving parts. He has both guided this effort and made significant individual technical contributions. He led in-house work at the Air Force research Laboratory, AFRL, authoring the IEEE WRG Baker award-winning paper in on this subject.

He initiated the Phased Arrays approach to active electro-optical systems for laser sensing and laser weapons, and published the first papers in this area in the late 1990s. The Phased Array approach to active EO systems for laser sensing and laser weapons now dominates the beam control sessions at Directed Energy Professional society (DEPs) meetings. McManamon emphasized performance based sensing for combined sensor and processing development as chief scientist, AFRL Sensors to define an information goal, and develop the required sensors and processing to achieve that goal.

In the early 1990s, he initiated and guided 2D LADAR Lidar for long range ID. He had the vision to use the designator laser along with a near IR camera to identify objects at longer range at night than can be done with a thermal imager. The 2D LADAR for long range ID that McManamon initiated, is now being deployed in the U.S. Air Force and Army. It significantly increases the object recognition range for U.S. aircraft. From the late 1980s until 2008 McManamon led the team at AFRL developing numerous LADAR technologies, including laser vibrometers, and synthetic aperture LADAR.

McManamon was an early advocate of pro-active Infrared countermeasures recommending a Defense Advanced Research Projects Agency program called medusa. The concept of pro-active IRCM has become prominent in the Air Force countermeasures community.

== Later career ==
McManamon recently chaired a National Academy of Sciences (NAS) Study on Active EO Sensing. The published study was called “Laser Radar Progress and Opportunities in Active Electro-Optical Sensing". Laser radar is becoming a significant sensor, with multiple sensing modalities. Shortly before that, McManamon was co-chair of the harnessing Light 2 National Academy of Sciences committee, which published the study “Optics and Photonics: Essential Technologies for Our Nation.”

This study recommended a National Photonics Initiative (NPI), as optics and photonics are key enablers in the U.S. economy. The White House commissioned a fast-track committee to respond to the recommendations of the Optics and Photonics study. NPI is proceeding with significant vigor, in both the Congress and the Executive Branch.

As a result of the study's recommendations and subsequent photonics activity, the U.S. Department of Defense has selected photonics as the focus of a new Institute for Manufacturing Innovation (IMI). The institute will be the largest of the National Network of Manufacturing Innovation Institutes and will comprise a total of $200 million public and private funding.

McManamon was vice chair of the NAS study "Seeing photons," dealing with passive electro-optical sensors.

McManamon is president and CTO of Exciting Technology LLC and works part-time at the University of Dayton as Technical Director of the Ladar and Optical Communications Institute, LOCI, in the EO department.

== Uber vs Waymo lawsuit on stealing the self-driving technology ==
McManamon served as an expert witness on LiDAR (Light Detection And Ranging) technology, which helps self-driving cars see and navigate, in the Uber v. Waymo lawsuit.

== Honors and awards ==
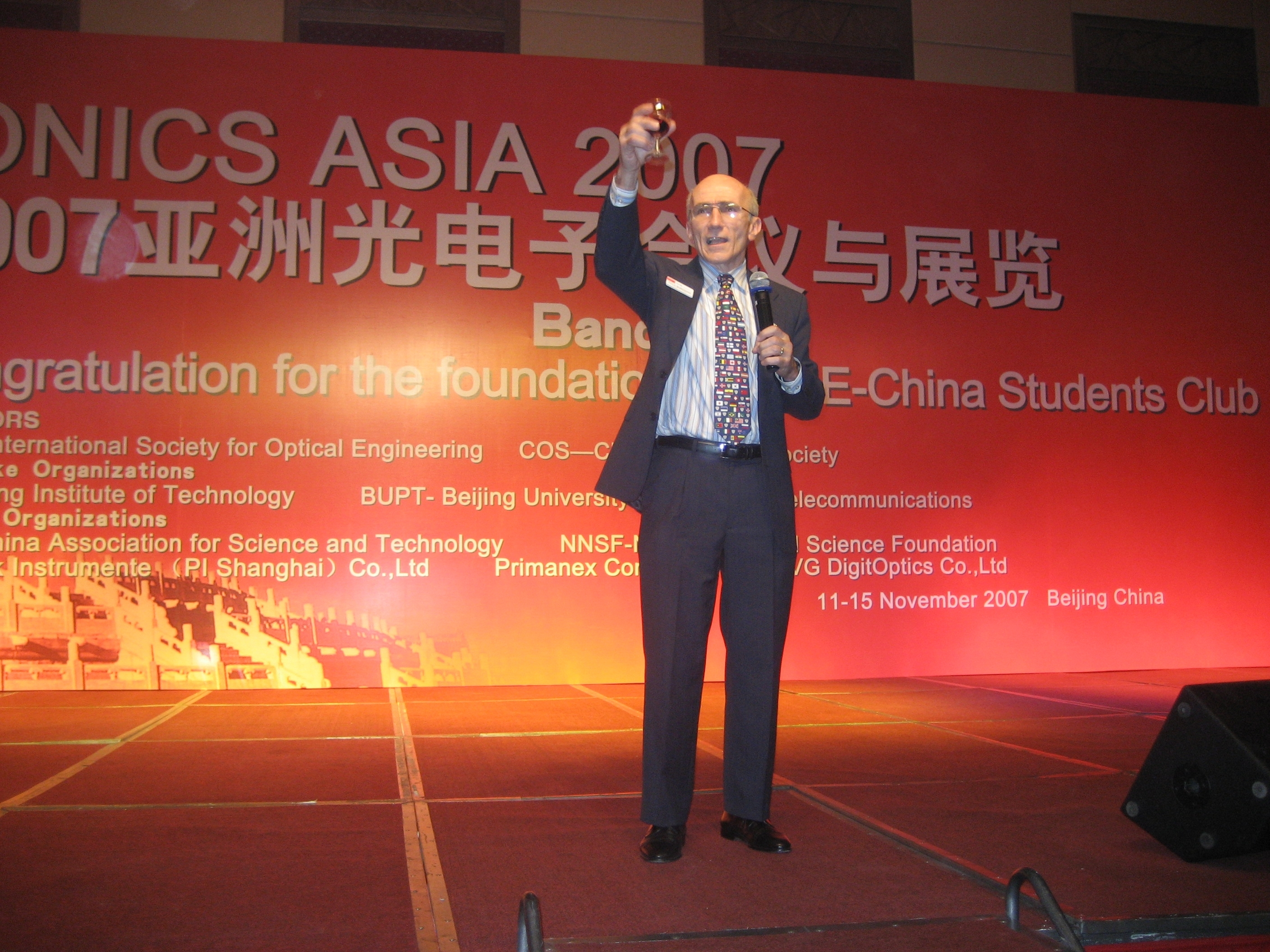
Paul McManamon, immediate past president of SPIE at Photonics Asia 2007 conference.

- President of SPIE, the International Society for Optics and Photonics. (2006)
- Joseph W. Goodman Book Writing Award: in recognition of his publication "LiDAR Technologies and Systems," published in 2019 by SPIE. (2022)
- IEEE W.R.G. Baker Award for best paper in any IEEE Journal or Publication. This includes over 100 separate refereed journals, containing over 20,000 separate articles. (1998)

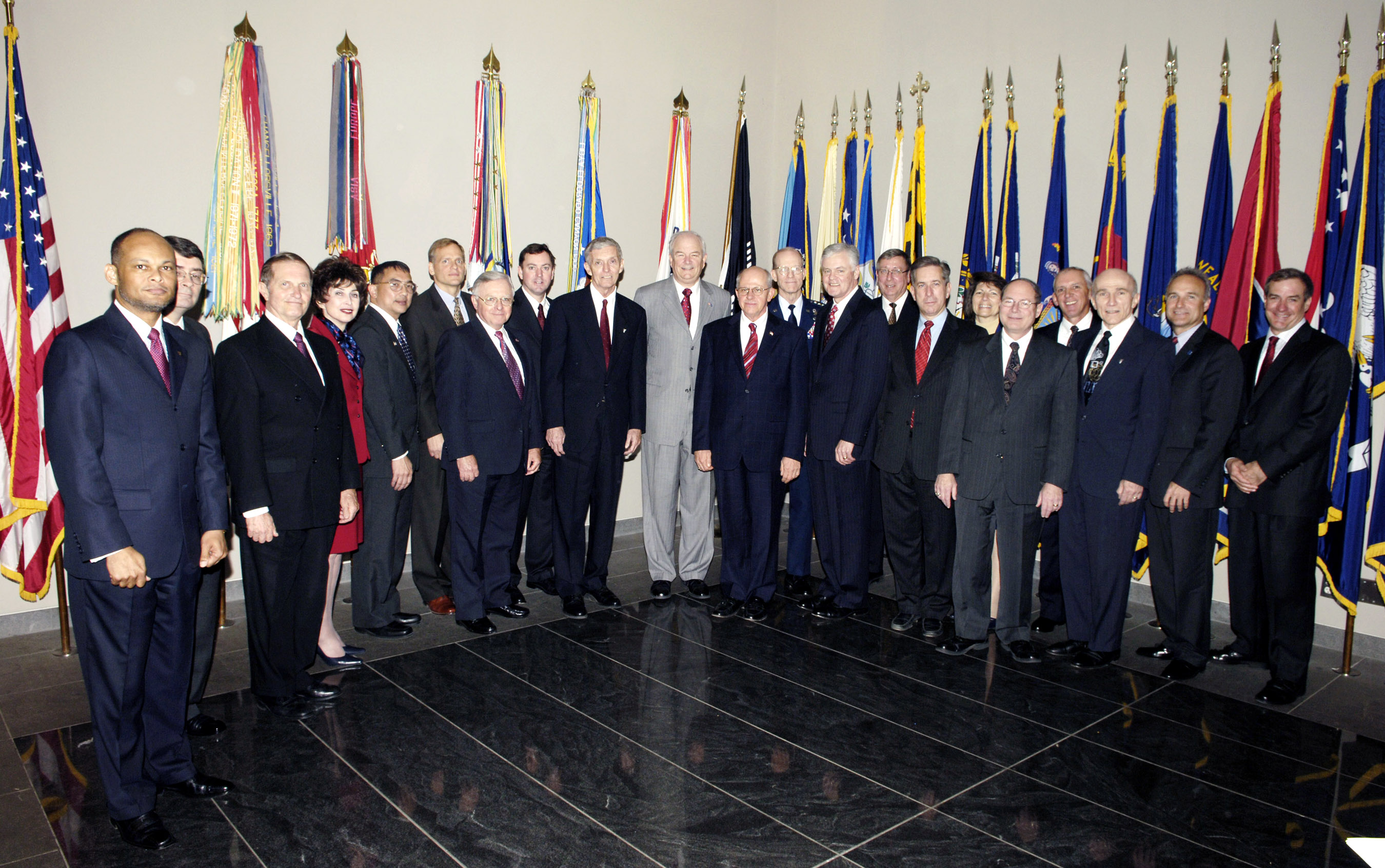
McManamon (3rd from right) along with other recipients of US Government Meritorious Presidential Rank Award, presented by Air Force Secretary Wynn (in gray suite in the centre) in Washington (2006)

- U.S. Government Meritorious Presidential Rank Award, presented by Air Force Secretary Wynn in a ceremony in Washington. The citation reads, “The Meritorious Senior Professional Rank Award is presented to McManamon for his dynamic and visionary leadership in the development of sensor and countermeasure technology for the United States Air Force, and for his international leadership of the optical engineering community.” (2006)
- Fellow, International Society for Optics and Photonics (SPIE). (1999)
- Fellow, Air Force Research Laboratory (AFRL). (2002)
- Fellow, Optical Society of America (OSA). (2007)
- Fellow, Institute of Electrical and Electronics Engineers (IEEE). (2008)
- Fellow, Military Sensing Symposia (MSS). (2008)
- Fellow, Directed Energy Professional Society (DEPS). (2012)
- Fellow, American Institute of Aeronautics and Astronautics (AIAA). (2015)
- Harrell V. Noble award for electronic devices for work having significant impact (Dayton, OH section of the IEEE). (2003)
- Best paper award in the Automatic Target Recognition at the SPIE Defense Security and Sensing (DSS) symposium. (2008)

== Books authored ==
- LiDAR Technologies and Systems, (2019), published by SPIE (The International Society for Optics and Photonics), Date Published: 10 July 2019, Pages: 520, ISBN 9781510625396, Volume: PM300.This book won the Joseph W. Goodman Book Writing Award for 2022.
- Field Guide to LiDAR, (2015) published by SPIE (The International Society for Optics and Photonics), Published: 2015, PDF ISBN 9781628416558 | Print ISBN 9781628416541.
