= Tingye Li =

Chinese-American scientist

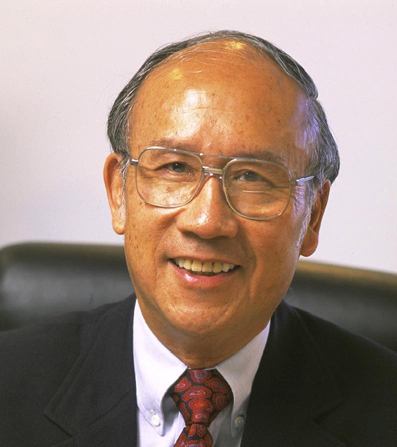
- Born: July 7, 1931; Nanjing, Republic of China
- Died: December 27, 2012 (aged 81); Snowbird, Utah, United States
- Education: University of the Witwatersrand; Northwestern University
- Awards: IEEE Baker Prize (1975); OSA Frederic Ives Medal (1997); IEEE Photonics Award (2004); IEEE Edison Medal (2009)
- Scientific career
- Fields: Applied physics, Optical communication
- Workplaces: AT&T

Tingye Li (simplified Chinese: 厉鼎毅; traditional Chinese: 厲鼎毅; pinyin: Lì Dǐngyì; July 7, 1931 – December 27, 2012) was a Chinese-American scientist in the fields of microwaves, lasers and optical communications. His innovative work at AT&T pioneered the research and application of lightwave communication, and has had a far-reaching impact on information technology for over four decades.

== Education and research ==
Tingye Li was born on July 7, 1931 in Nanjing, Jiangsu Province, the eldest son of a diplomat. His father was a senior officer of the Chinese Foreign Ministry (before 1949, the Republic of China) and served as an ambassador to several countries. At the age of 12, Li and his family left China to join his father in Canada. Later they lived in South Africa before eventually settling in the United States.

Tingye obtained his bachelor's degree from the School of Electrical and Information Engineering at the University of the Witwatersrand in Johannesburg, South Africa, and his Ph.D. from Northwestern University. After graduating in 1957, he began working at Bell Telephone Laboratories (later AT&T Bell Laboratories), working there for 41 years until his retirement from AT&T Labs in 1998. During his tenure at AT&T, he wrote and contributed to many journal papers, patents, and books in the areas of antennas, microwave propagation, lasers and optical communications.

In 1961, Li and his colleague A. Gardner Fox published a paper titled Resonant modes in a maser interferometer, which showed that "a laser beam bouncing back and forth between a pair of mirrors can resonate for a number of modes of energy distribution and for each of these traverse modes there is a different characteristic phase velocity and attenuation per transit." They used computer simulation techniques to obtain their data. This work was the first to point out that an open-sided resonator containing a laser medium should have unique modes of propagation, which is fundamental to the theory and practice of lasers. This work is now considered a classic and has been cited over 595 times (SCI) since its publication in 1961 until 1979 when Mr. Fox recalled and gave some remarks on their work. The work has been cited over 2000 times (Google Scholar) till Oct. 2024.

From the late 1960s, Li engaged in pioneering research on lightwave technologies and systems, which are now ubiquitously deployed in the telecommunications industry. In the late 1980s, when the whole world's attention on optical communication was still focused on a single-channel high-speed solution, he and his team developed the world's first (sparse channel) wavelength-division multiplexing (WDM) system at AT&T Bell Labs. With the understanding that a technique can only be put into real use if it remains backward compatible with existing technology, he and his team proposed and studied the use of optical amplifiers in WDM systems, which utilized the existing embedded base to create virtual fibers by putting more channels onto a single fiber. Their experiment in 1992 at Roaring Creek turned out to be a "roaring success" as Li claimed in an interview, allowing 2.5 Gbit/s transmission per channel, the highest rate available at the time. The use of optical amplifiers changed the paradigm of network economics and is considered to be of revolutionary significance (though evolutionary in design) in the history of lightwave communications.

Li was active in a number of academic societies. He was the initiator of many conferences in optical communication and has often been invited to give plenary speeches. Because of his outstanding contribution and spirit of service, he was elected the President of the Optical Society of America (OSA) in 1995. He was also a member of the National Academy of Engineering, the Academia Sinica (Taiwan) and the Chinese Academy of Engineering.

Years at AT&T
Division	Position	Years
Radio Research Department	Researcher	1957–1967
Repeater Techniques Research Department	Director	1967–1976
Lightwave Media Research Department	Director	1976–1984
Lightwave Systems Research Department	Director	1984–1996
AT&T Labs-Research, Communications; Infrastructure Research Laboratory	Division Manager	1996–1998
AT&T	Consultant	1999–2002

== Chinese heritage ==
Tingye Li's father Chao Li (厲斯昭) had served in the Chinese government for many years. His mother Lily Hsieh(謝緯鵬) held a degree in Chinese literature from Ginling College, and was an activist in the Chinese women's liberation movement. His father-in-law K. C. Wu was an important figure in China's modern history and was a governor of Taiwan. Dr. Li has also made a great contribution to the development of China's optical communication industry. He contributed significantly to the technical exchanges between US and Chinese scientists and technologists at both sides of the Taiwan Strait. He has introduced many world-class experts to lecture in China, bringing to the country the state-of-art technology in optical communication. Thanks to his effort, the research and application of optical communication in China has made a great progress in the recent 30 years. He was named an honorary professor at many top-tier universities in China (including Tsinghua University, Peking University, Shanghai Jiao Tong University, Beijing University of Posts and Telecommunications, Northern Jiaotong University, Fudan University, Nankai University, Tianjin University, University of Electronic Science and Technology of China, and Qufu Normal University), elected as the very first foreign member of the Chinese Academy of Engineering and member of the Academia Sinica in Taiwan, and was granted honorary doctoral degrees by National Chiao Tung University in Taiwan and his mother school the University of the Witwatersrand.

== Philosophy ==
Li has said that developing components and devices must involve good understanding of systems applications and systems economics. This methodology was reflected in his introduction of optical amplifiers in WDM which offered network providers a graceful upgrade. Li has also mentored many younger colleagues, and was known to many as "Uncle Tingye."

== Personal ==
Li's speeches, even on some dull technical topics, are known to be quite entertaining. One example was at the ITCom 2001 conference, where he gave a talk titled "Crouching Technologies and Hidden Profits", a play on the film "Crouching Tiger, Hidden Dragon".

Li believed component research must involve good system understanding. One of his famous quotations was "good physicists upgrade themselves into system engineers." He also coined the term phantomics referring to research efforts in photonic technologies that are looking for a use that is very unclear or unreal.

Dr. Tingye Li lived with his wife Edith Wu (simplified Chinese: 吴修惠; traditional Chinese: 吳修惠; pinyin: Wú Xīuhuì) in Boulder, Colorado. He was an independent consultant in the field of lightwave communications. His brother Ting-Kai Li (simplified Chinese: 厉鼎凯; traditional Chinese: 厲鼎凱; pinyin: Lì Dǐngkaǐ, 1934–November 18, 2018) was a prominent medical scientist and served as the director of the National Institute on Alcohol Abuse and Alcoholism (NIAAA) between 2002 and 2008. His brother-in-law, Sherman Wu, was an activist and academic at Northwestern University.

He died on December 27, 2012, in Snowbird, Utah.

== Companies ==
Dr. Li was active in fostering innovation through new companies. He was heavily involved in New Focus, Kotura, and a number of others. He was also a co-founder, member of the Board of Directors, and active contributor with Insight Photonic Solutions, Inc.

== Quotation ==
- "Photonics is a 40-year overnight success."
- "If winter comes, can spring be far behind?"

- Tingye Li at OFC '02, adapted from "Ode to the West Wind", by Percy Bysshe Shelley

- "I only hire people smarter than I."
- "Good physicists upgrade themselves into system engineers."

== Awards and honors ==
- IEEE W.R.G. Baker Prize Paper Award - 1975 (together with Stewart E. Miller and Enrique A. J. Marcatili)
- Fellow of The Optical Society - 1977
- Achievement Awards from the Chinese Institute of Engineers/USA - 1978
- IEEE David Sarnoff Award - 1979
- member of the National Academy of Engineering - 1980
- Alumni Merit Award from Northwestern University - 1981
- Achievement Awards from the Chinese American and Professional Association -1983
- member of the Academia Sinica - 1994
- OSA/IEEE-LEOS John Tyndall Award - 1995
- member of the Chinese Academy of Engineering - 1996
- OSA Frederic Ives Medal - 1997
- AT&T Science and Technology Medal - 1997
- Achievement Awards from the Photonics Society of Chinese-Americans - 1998
- IEEE Photonics Award - 2004
- IEEE Edison Medal - 2009

== Books ==
- Optical Fiber Communications: Fiber Fabrication, Tingye Li, 1985
- Topics in Lightwave Transmission Systems, Tingye Li, 1991
- Optical Fiber Telecommunications IV-A : Components, Ivan P. Kaminow and Tingye Li, 2002
- Optical Fiber Telecommunications IV-B : Systems and Impairments, Ivan P. Kaminow and Tingye Li, 2002

== See also ==
- Optical Society of America#Past Presidents of the OSA
