= Leon O. Chua =

American electrical engineer and computer scientist

- 蔡少棠
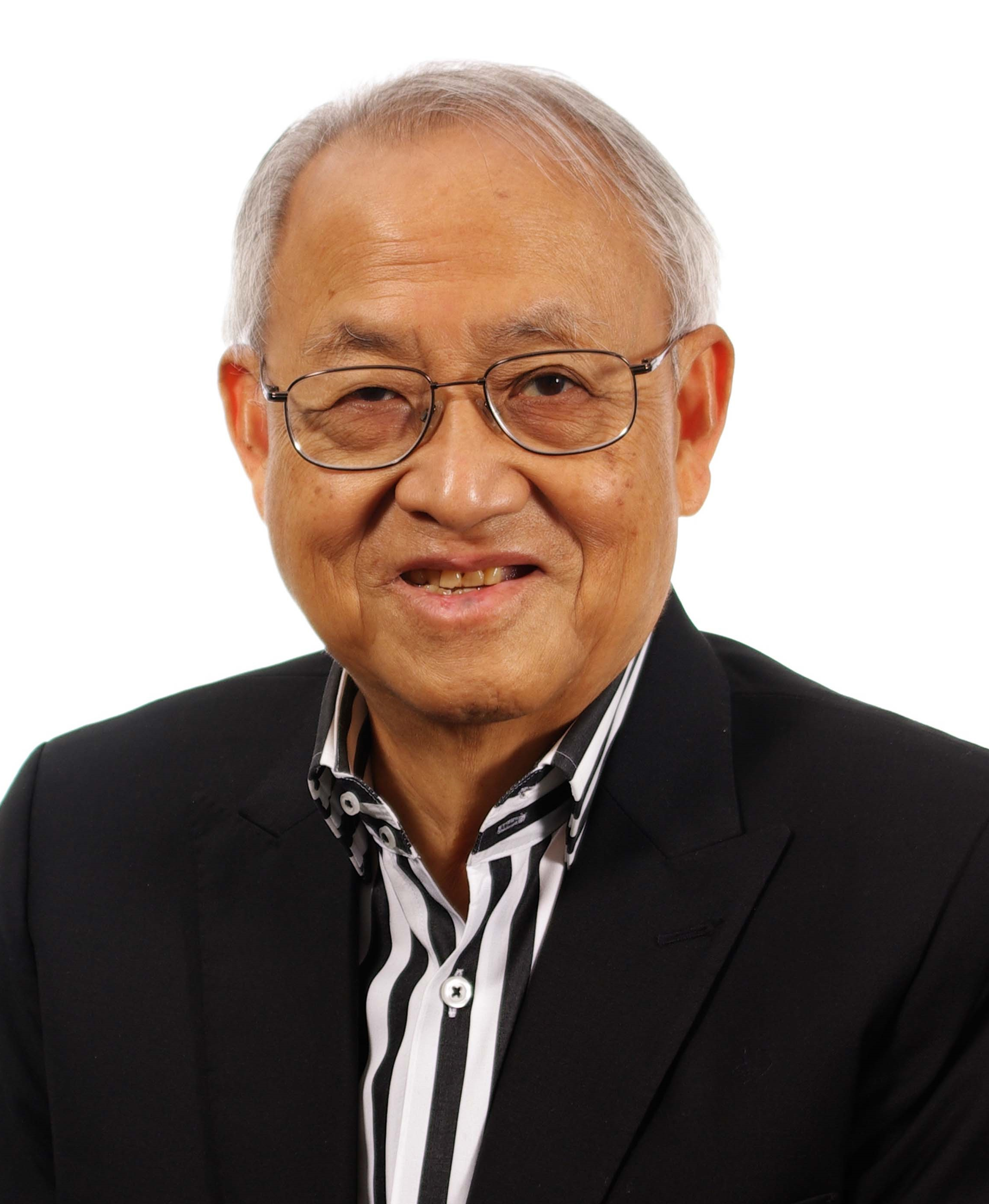
- Chua in 2018
- Born: Leon Ong Chua; June 28, 1936 (age 90); Commonwealth of the Philippines
- Citizenship: American
- Education: Mapúa University (BS); Massachusetts Institute of Technology (MS); University of Illinois, Urbana-Champaign (PhD)
- Known for: Nonlinear circuit theory; Cellular neural networks; Memristor; Chua's circuit
- Children: 4, including Amy
- Awards: IEEE Browder J. Thompson Memorial Prize Award (1967); IEEE W.R.G. Baker Prize Paper Award (1973); IEEE Guillemin-Cauer Award (1972, 1985, 1989); M. E. Van Valkenburg Award (1995, 1998); IEEE Neural Networks Pioneer Award (2000); IEEE Gustav Robert Kirchhoff Award (2005); IEEE Circuits and Systems Society Vitold Belevitch Award (2007); Guggenheim Fellowship (2010)
- Scientific career
- Fields: Electrical engineering Electronics and communication engineering Computer science
- Workplaces: University of California, Berkeley; Purdue University
- Thesis: Nonlinear network analysis – the parametric approach
- Doctoral advisor: Mac Van Valkenburg
- Notable students: Stephen P. Boyd; Sung-Mo Kang; Orla Feely

Chinese name
- Traditional Chinese: 蔡少棠
- Simplified Chinese: 蔡少棠
Transcriptions
Standard Mandarin
- Hanyu Pinyin: Cài Shǎotáng
Southern Min
- Hokkien POJ: Chhòa Siáu-tông

Leon Ong Chua (/ˈtʃwɑː/; Chinese: 蔡少棠; pinyin: Cài Shǎotáng; Wade–Giles: Ts'ai Shao-t'ang; Pe̍h-ōe-jī: Chhòa Siáu-tông; born June 28, 1936) is a Chinese-American electrical engineer and computer scientist. He is a professor emeritus of electrical engineering and computer science at the University of California, Berkeley, which he joined in 1971. He has contributed to nonlinear circuit theory and cellular neural network theory and is recognized as the "Father of Nonlinear Circuit Theory" or electronic devices from nonlinear components.

He is the inventor and namesake of Chua's circuit one of the first and most widely known circuits to exhibit chaotic behavior, and was the first to conceive the theories behind, and postulate the existence of, the memristor. Thirty-seven years after he predicted its existence, a working solid-state memristor was created by a team led by R. Stanley Williams at Hewlett Packard.

Alongside Tamas Roska, Chua also introduced the first algorithmically programmable analog cellular neural network (CNN) processor.

== Early life and education ==
Chua was born in the Philippines on June 28, 1936, to a Hoklo Chinese family. He and his twin sister grew up as Chinese Filipinos under the reign of the Empire of Japan during World War II. His parents immigrated from Jinjiang, Southern Fujian.

In 1958, Chua earned his BS in electrical engineering from the Mapúa Institute of Technology in Manila, Philippines. He briefly taught at Mapúa for a year, before emigrating to the United States on a scholarship to the Massachusetts Institute of Technology, where he earned an MS in electrical engineering degree in 1961. He then earned a PhD from the University of Illinois, Urbana-Champaign, in 1964. His dissertation was titled, Nonlinear Network Analysis—The Parametric Approach.

Chua has four daughters: Amy Chua (the eldest), a professor of law at Yale University; Katrin, a Professor of Medicine at Stanford University; Cynthia, a Special Olympics gold medalist; and Michelle, a Yale Law School graduate. In addition to his four daughters, Chua has seven grandchildren.

== Career ==
Chua was a member of the faculty at Purdue University from 1964 to 1970 before joining Berkeley in 1971. His current research interests include cellular neural networks, nonlinear networks, nonlinear circuits and systems, nonlinear dynamics, bifurcation theory, and chaos theory. He was the editor of The International Journal of Bifurcation and Chaos until 2009, and is now the honorary editor.

== Awards and honors ==
- 2019 EDS Celebrated Member Prize
- 2020 Julius Springer Prize in Applied Physics.
- Member of the European Academy of Sciences 1997, http://www.ae-info.org/ae/User/Chua_Leon and Hungarian Academy of Sciences 2007.
- He was elected as Confrérie des Chevaliers du Tastevin in 2000.
- Doctor Honoris Causa from the École Polytechnique Fédérale de Lausanne, Switzerland (1983)
- Honorary doctorate from the University of Tokushima, Japan (1984)
- Honorary doctorate from the Technische Universität Dresden, Germany (1992)
- Doctor Honoris Causa from the Technical University of Budapest, Hungary (1994)
- Doctor Honoris Causa from the University of Santiago de Compostela, Spain (1995)
- Doctor Honoris Causa from the Goethe University Frankfurt, Germany (1996)
- Doctor Honoris Causa from the Gheorghe Asachi Technical University of Iaşi, Romania (1997)
- Doctor Honoris Causa from the University of Catania, Italy (2000)
- Doctor Honoris Causa from the AGH University of Science and Technology, Poland (2003)
- Docteur Honoris Causa (Honorary Doctorate), Doğuş University, Turkey (2005)
- Docteur Honoris Causa (Honorary Doctorate), Universite du Sud, Toulon, France, 2006
- Doctor Honoris Causa from the University of Le Havre, France (2009)
- Honorary Doctorate, 2011.University of the West of England, England.
- Doctor Honoris Causa from the KU Leuven, Belgium (2013)
- Doctor of Science Honoris Causa from the Hong Kong Polytechnic University, Hong Kong (2014)
- Doctor Honoris Causa from the Polytechnic University of Turin, Italy (2015)
- IEEE Browder J. Thompson Memorial Prize Award (1967)
- IEEE Guillemin-Cauer Award (1972, 1985, 1989)
- IEEE W.R.G. Baker Prize Paper Award (1973), for the paper "Memristor: The Missing Circuit Element" in IEEE TRANSACTIONS on Circuit Theory, September 1971
- IEEE Neural Networks Pioneer Award (2000)
- IEEE Gustav Robert Kirchhoff Award (2005), For seminal contributions to the foundation of nonlinear circuit theory, and for inventing Chua's Circuit and Cellular Networks, each spawning a new research area.
- M. E. Van Valkenburg Award (1995 and 1998)
- IEEE Circuits and Systems Society Vitold Belevitch Award (2007), For seminal contributions to nonlinear circuit theory, the first mathematically proven physical implementation of Chaos (Chua circuit), the local activity principle as the root of complexity, the cellular neural/nonlinear network principle and basic theory, and the qualitative theory of complexity in 1D cellular automata.
- 2010 Guggenheim Fellowship
