= Lee Swindlehurst =

American academic (born 1960)

A. Lee Swindlehurst
- Born: Arnold Lee Swindlehurst; 1960 (age 65–66); Boulder City
- Education: Stanford University; Brigham Young University
- Awards: 2000 IEEE W. R. G. Baker Prize 2006 IEEE Signal Processing Society’s Best Paper Award; 2010 IEEE Signal Processing Society’s Best Paper Award; 2021 IEEE Signal Processing Society’s Best Paper Award; 2006 IEEE Communications Society Stephen O. Rice Prize Co-author: 2001 IEEE Signal Processing Society Young Author Best Paper Award
- Scientific career
- Fields: Estimation and Detection Theory, Signal Processing
- Workplaces: University of California, Irvine
- Doctoral advisor: Thomas Kailath
- Other academic advisors: Wynn C. Stirling
- Website: http://newport.eecs.uci.edu/~swindle/

Lee Swindlehurst (born 1960 in Boulder City) is an electrical engineer who has made contributions in sensor array signal processing for radar and wireless communications, detection and estimation theory, and system identification, and has received many awards in these areas. He is currently a Professor of Electrical Engineering and Computer Science at the University of California, Irvine.

== Biography ==
He received the B.S., summa cum laude, and M.S. degrees in Electrical Engineering from Brigham Young University, Provo, Utah, in 1985 and 1986, respectively, and the PhD degree in Electrical Engineering from Stanford University in 1991. From 1986-1990, he was employed at ESL, Inc., of Sunnyvale, CA, where he was involved in the design of algorithms and architectures for several radar and sonar signal processing systems. He was on the faculty of the Department of Electrical and Computer Engineering at Brigham Young University from 1990–2007, where he was a Full Professor and served as Department Chair from 2003-2006. During 1996-1997, he held a joint appointment as a visiting scholar at both Uppsala University, Uppsala, Sweden, and at the Royal Institute of Technology, Stockholm, Sweden. From 2006-07, he was the Vice President of Research for ArrayComm LLC in San Jose, California. After leaving ArrayComm in 2008, he began working at UC Irvine where he is currently the Assistant Dean.

Dr. Swindlehurst is a Fellow of the IEEE (2004) for contributions to the field of space-time signal processing for radar and wireless communications, and a past Secretary of the IEEE Signal Processing Society. He is a former Editor-in-Chief of the IEEE Journal of Selected Topics in Signal Processing, and has served as a member of the Editorial Boards for the EURASIP Journal on Wireless Communications and Networking and the IEEE Signal Processing Magazine, and is a past Associate Editor for the IEEE Transactions on Signal Processing. He was elected to the Tau Beta Pi society in 1985. He is a recipient of several paper awards: the 2000 IEEE W. R. G. Baker Prize Paper Award, the 2006, 2010, and 2021 IEEE Signal Processing Society’s Best Paper Award, the 2006 IEEE Communications Society Stephen O. Rice Prize in the Field of Communication Theory, and is co-author of a paper that received the IEEE Signal Processing Society Young Author Best Paper Award in 2001.
