= Walter Ransom Gail Baker =

American electrical engineer (1892–1960)

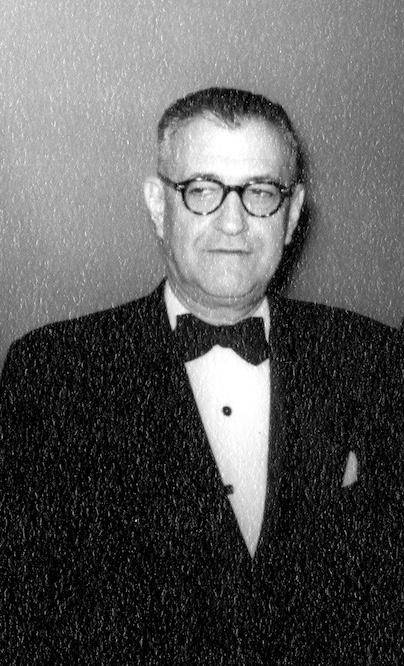
- Walter R. G. Baker
- Born: November 30, 1892; Lockport, New York
- Died: October 30, 1960 (aged 67); Syracuse, New York, U.S.
- Education: Union College
- Awards: IEEE Medal of Honor (1952); IEEE Founders Medal (1958)
- Scientific career
- Fields: Electrical engineering

Walter Ransom Gail Baker (November 30, 1892 – October 30, 1960) was an American electrical engineer. He was a vice president of General Electric, and was Director of Engineering for the Radio Manufacturers Association (now the Electronic Industries Alliance). At the urging of James Lawrence Fly, Chairman of the Federal Communications Commission (FCC), Baker founded the National Television System Committee, or NTSC, in 1940. He served as president of the Institute of Radio Engineers (IRE) in 1947.

Grave of W. R. G. Baker, Milton Cemetery

== Biography ==
He was born in Lockport, New York, in 1892. He graduated from Union College with a B.S. in electrical engineering in 1916. He took a job with General Electric in 1916 and worked on radio for military applications during World War I.

He received a M.S. in electrical engineering from Union College, in 1919.

He died on October 30, 1960.

== Awards and honors ==
Walter Baker received following awards and honors:

- The SMPTE David Sarnoff Medal in 1959
- The IRE Founders Award in 1958
- The Army Medal of Freedom in 1953
- The IRE Medal of Honor in 1952
- Eminent Member of Eta Kappa Nu in 1954
- IRE Fellow in 1928
- The initially called W.R.G. Baker Award provided by the Institute of Radio Engineers (IRE), was created in 1956 from a donation from Dr. Walter R. G. Baker to the IRE. The award continued to be awarded as IEEE W.R.G. Baker Award by the board of directors of the Institute of Electrical and Electronics Engineers (IEEE), after the IRE organization merged into the IEEE.

The call sign of (then)-General Electric owned television station in Schenectady, WRGB (then an NBC station, it joined CBS in 1981), was chosen in his honor.
