= James Kaiser =

American electrical engineer (1929–2020)

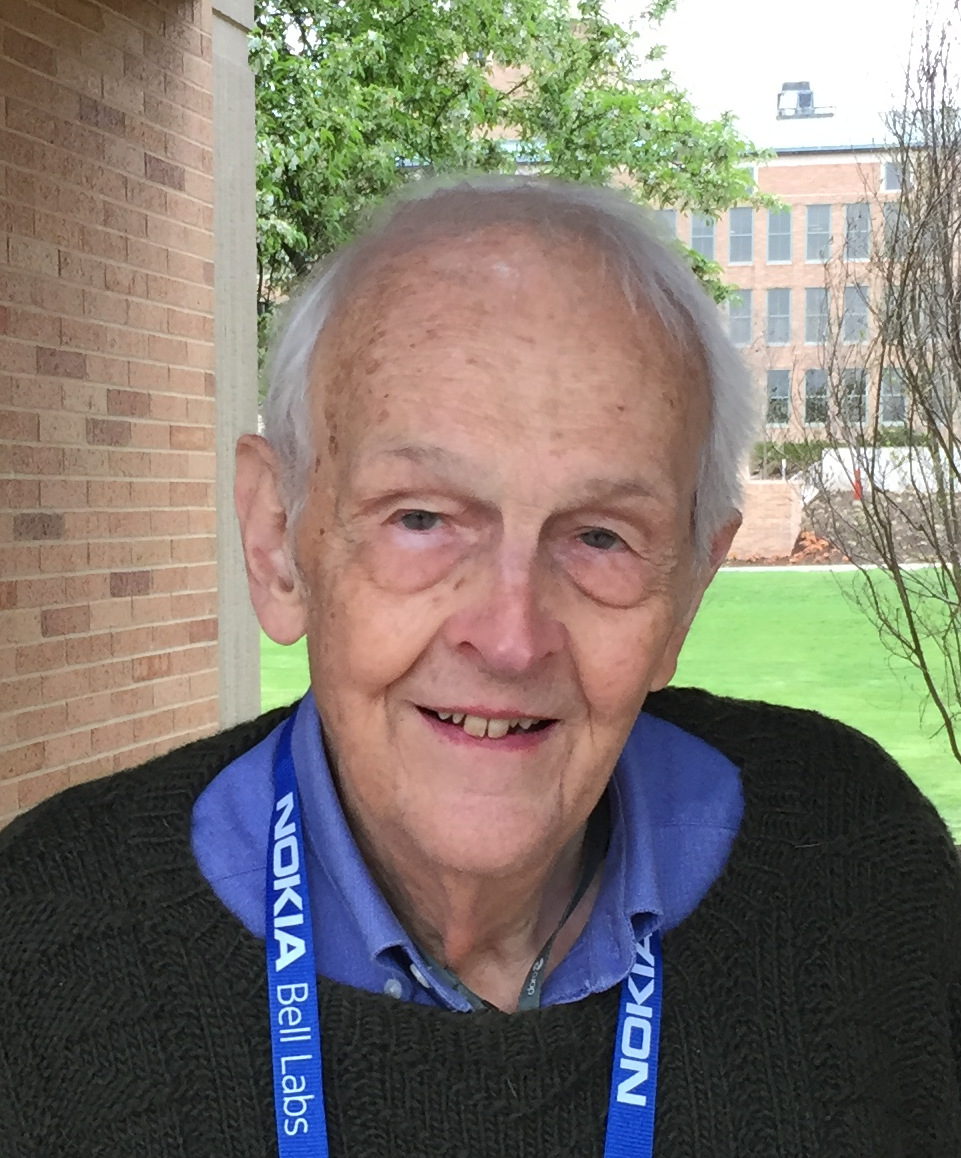
- Jim Kaiser visiting Nokia Bell Labs in 2016
- Born: Dec. 10, 1929; Piqua, Ohio
- Died: February 13, 2020 (aged 90); Chapel Hill, North Carolina
- Citizenship: American
- Education: University of Cincinnati; MIT
- Known for: Kaiser window Teager–Kaiser energy operator
- Awards: IEEE Fellow (1973); Bell Labs Distinguished Technical Staff (1982); IEEE Centennial Medal (1984); IEEE W.R.G. Baker Award (1995); IEEE Jack S. Kilby Signal Processing Medal (2000)
- Scientific career
- Fields: Digital signal processing
- Workplaces: Bell Labs; Bellcore
- Thesis: Constraints and performance indices in the analytical design of linear controls (1959)
- Doctoral advisor: George C. Newton Jr.

James Frederick Kaiser (Dec. 10, 1929 – Feb. 13, 2020) was an American electrical engineer noted for his contributions in signal processing. He was an IEEE Fellow and received many honors and awards, including the IEEE Centennial Medal, the IEEE W.R.G. Baker Award, the Bell Laboratories Distinguished Technical Staff Award, and the IEEE Jack S. Kilby Signal Processing Medal.

== Biography ==
Kaiser was born in Piqua, Ohio, and earned his electrical engineering degree from the University of Cincinnati in 1952. He then moved to the Massachusetts Institute of Technology and received his masters and doctorate degrees in 1954 and 1959, respectively.

Following his doctorate, he received a three-year appointment as an assistant professor at MIT but decided to take a leave of absence to work at Bell Labs. Although the arrangement was due to only last for a year, he enjoyed the work so much that he elected to stay. While at Bell Labs, he worked on a variety of projects in signal processing for human speech and hearing, later focusing his attention on filter design for digital signals.

During the Bell System breakup in 1984, Kaiser moved to Bellcore. After he retired from Bellcore, he served as a visiting professor at Duke University and Rutgers University.

Kaiser died at age 90 in February, 2020, after a brief illness. After his passing, his family contacted the HOA of the neighborhood he lived in and a memorial was agreed to be built. The project was funded in large part by Kaiser's family, with the HOA and individual doners contributing. A stone masonry company based out of Asheville, Hammerhead Stoneworks, built the patio with benches in 2023. The patio mosaic design was inspired by Kaiser's family saying his interests were: mountains, music, mathematics, and Margo (his wife). The design was a modified Fibonacci Sequence that gave the impression of a hurricane, which are common in North Carolina. A dedication was held in memory of Kaiser and unveiling the memorial in 2023.
