= Martin H. Krieger =

American physicist, author, and academic (1944–2024)

Martin Harvey Krieger (March 10, 1944 – July 10, 2024) was an American physicist, author, and emeritus professor with decades of teaching in public policy and urban planning. He was known for his research on mathematical models of urban phenomena, ecological issues of design and planning, notions of uncertainty in policy and planning, environmental policy, defense policy, and aural and visual documentation of urban phenomena in southern California, especially Los Angeles.

== Life and career ==
Martin was born on March 10, 1944, in Brooklyn, New York, and was brought up as an Orthodox Jew in Bensonhurst, Brooklyn. At Columbia University he graduated in physics with a B.A. magna cum laude in 1965, an M.A. in 1965, and a Ph.D. in 1969. His Ph.D. thesis is entitled Neutron Emission from Muon Capture.

From 1968 to 1973 Krieger worked at the University of California, Berkeley — from 1968 to 1969 as a physicist at the Lawrence Radiation Laboratory, from 1969 to 1972 as an assistant research planner at the Institute of Urban and Regional Development (IURD, established in 1962), and from 1970 to 1973 at the UC Berkeley College of Environmental Design as a lecturer in environmental policy, in city and regional planning, and in architecture. From 1973 to 1974 he was a fellow at the Center for Advanced Study in the Behavioral Sciences adjacent to Stanford University. From 1974 to 1980 (with leave of absence from 1978 to 1980) he was an assistant professor at the University of Minnesota's Hubert H. Humphrey Institute of Public Affairs. From 1978 to 1979 he was a fellow at the National Humanities Center in North Carolina. From 1980 to 1984 he taught and did research at the Massachusetts Institute of Technology (MIT), in the Program in Science, Technology, and Society and in the Department of Urban Studies and Planning. At the University of Southern California (USC) he was an associate professor of planning from 1984 to 1991 and a full professor from 1991 until his retirement as professor emeritus. For the academic year 1990–1991 he was on leave of absence from USC and held a visiting associate professorship in business administration at the University of Michigan, as the Zell-Lurie Fellow in the Teaching of Entrepreneurship. He received many fellowships and grants for his research and contributed to numerous photographic exhibits. He was the author of ten books.

From about 1998 to 2019, Krieger systematically photographed, among other topics: storefront houses of worship in Los Angeles (750+); all the Los Angeles Department of Water and Power electrical substations (125); the Orthodox Jewish enclave Pico-Robertson; industrial streetscapes in Los Angeles and then industrial worksites in Los Angeles (225), showing people at work; sellers at swap meets in Los Angeles, as entrepreneurs; "transit oriented development" in neighborhoods surrounding New York City Subway Stations (75), and a similar but more limited project internationally, at first in Barcelona and Singapore (project ceased due to 2020 quarantines).

In another project, Krieger and collaborators rephotographed Paris scenes that were originally photographed by Charles Marville (1813–1879), before and after photographs as Paris was reconstructed under Baron Haussmann and Napoleon III.

In the latter part of this period, Krieger recorded in calibrated and accurate surround sound: people talking on the bus in Los Angeles; the ambience in various sites in Los Angeles; worship services at storefront houses of worship, among other projects.

The visual and aural research was supported by grants from the John Randolph Haynes and Dora Haynes Foundation. Much of the photographic material is archived at calisphere.org under "Martin Krieger Collection."

Krieger received the USC-Mellon Award for Excellence in Mentoring three times: in 2005, in 2006, and in 2007, for mentoring, respectively, undergraduates, faculty, and graduate students. In 2006 he was elected a fellow of the American Physical Society for "his series of books on the historical development of models and the mathematics employed in twentieth-century physics, especially the Ising model and its relatives and the proofs of the stability of matter." Martin died on July 10, 2024, at the age of 80.

== Selected publications ==
=== Articles ===
- Krieger, Martin H. (1970). "Six propositions on the poor and pollution". Policy Sciences. 1: 311–324. doi:10.1007/BF00145215. S2CID 154389026.
- —— (1973). "What's Wrong with Plastic Trees?". Science. 179 (4072): 446–455. Bibcode:1973Sci...179..446K. doi:10.1126/science.179.4072.446. PMID 17739132. S2CID 13078834.
- —— (1974). "Some New Directions for Planning Theories". Journal of the American Institute of Planners. 40 (3): 156–163. doi:10.1080/01944367408977465.
- —— (Summer 1986). "Big decisions and a culture of decisionmaking". Journal of Policy Analysis and Management. 5 (4): 779–797. doi:10.1002/pam.4050050407.
- —— (1987). "Planning and design as theological and religious activities". Environment and Planning B: Planning and Design. 14 (1): 5–13. Bibcode:1987EnPlB..14....5K. doi:10.1068/b140005. S2CID 143626695.
- —— (1991). "Theorems as meaningful cultural artifacts: Making the world additive". Synthese. 88 (2): 135–154. doi:10.1007/BF00567742. S2CID 46955725.
- —— (1995). "What Does Jerusalem Have to do with Athens?: Roles for the Humanities in Planning". Journal of Planning Education and Research. 14 (3): 217–221. doi:10.1177/0739456X9501400312. S2CID 143618865.
- —— (November 2004). "Some of what mathematicians do" (PDF). Notices of the AMS. 51 (10): 1226–1230.
- trans. by Krieger, Martin H. (March 2005). "A 1940 letter of André Weil on analogy in mathematics" (PDF). Notices of the AMS. 52 (3): 334–341.
- ——; Holman, Tomlinson (2007). "A Dozen "Tamales!"". Journal of Planning Education and Research. 27 (2): 228–230. doi:10.1177/0739456X07308575. S2CID 108524653.
- Ra, Moo-Ryong; Paek, Jeongyeup; Sharma, Abhishek B.; Govindan, Ramesh; ——; Neely, Michael J. (2010). "Energy-delay tradeoffs in smartphone applications". Proceedings of the 8th international conference on Mobile systems, applications, and services - Mobi Sys '10. p. 255. doi:10.1145/1814433.1814459. ISBN 9781605589855. S2CID 6671040. (over 350 citations)
- ——; Ra, Moo-Ryong; Paek, Jeongyeup; Govindan, Ramesh; Evans-Cowley, Jennifer (2010). "Urban Tomography". Journal of Urban Technology. 17 (2): 21–36. doi:10.1080/10630732.2010.515087. S2CID 20936562.
- —— (2010). "Commentary: The City-Inscribed and City-Natural-At Your Feet". Journal of Planning Education and Research. 29 (4): 491–493. doi:10.1177/0739456X10363388. S2CID 144107841.
- Banerjee, T.; Loukaitou-Sideris, eds. (2011). "Chapter 18. Media Tools for Urban Design by M. Krieger". Companion to Urban Design. London: Routledge. pp. 338–348. ISBN 9781136920080.
- —— (2011). "Commentary: Lessons from Charles Marville—Preserving Detail in Media Documentation of Cities, Studying that Detail in Urban Research". Journal of Planning Education and Research. 31 (2): 217–219. doi:10.1177/0739456X10397279. S2CID 147118610.
- —— (April 2018). "Opinion: Don't Just Begin with "Let a be an algebra..."". Notices of the American Mathematical Society. 65 (4): 1. doi:10.1090/noti1658.
- —— (2020). "Legerdemain in Mathematical Physics: Structure, Tricks, and Lacunae in Derivations of the Partition Function of the Two-Dimensional Ising Model and in Proofs of The Stability of Matter". arXiv:2009.12016 [cond-mat.stat-mech].
- —— (2021). "Options and Insurance for Planning". Journal of Planning Education and Research. 41: 106–107. doi:10.1177/0739456x18773430. S2CID 149661213.
- —— (2022). "Packaging Spectra (as in Partition Functions and L/$\zeta$-functions) to Reveal Symmetries (Reciprocity) in Nature and in Numbers". arXiv:2205.04931 [cond-mat.stat-mech].

=== Books ===
- Advice and Planning. Philadelphia: Temple University Press. 1981. ISBN 978-0877222170.; xiv + 241 pp.
- Marginalism and Discontinuity: Tools for the Crafts of Knowledge and Decision. New York: Russell Sage Foundation. 1989. ISBN 978-0871544889.; xxiii + 182 pp.
- The Constitutions of Matter: Mathematically Modeling the Most Everyday of Physical Phenomena. Chicago: University of Chicago Press. 1996.; xxii + 343 pp. MR 1425391
  - Krieger, Martin H. (April 28, 1998). 1998 pbk edition. University of Chicago Press. ISBN 9780226453057.
- Entrepreneurial Vocations: Learning from the Callings of Augustine, Moses, Mothers, Antigone, Oedipus and Prospero. Atlanta: Scholars Press. 1996. pp. xvii + 210 pp.
  - reprint. Duke University Press. 2000. ISBN 978-0788502521.
- What's Wrong With Plastic Trees?: Artifice and Authenticity in Design. Westport: Praeger. 2000. ISBN 978-0275967765.; xxi + 157 pp.
- Krieger, Martin H. (2003). Doing Mathematics: Convention, Subject, Calculation, Analogy. Singapore: World Scientific. ISBN 981-238-200-3.; xviii + 454 pp. MR 1961400 According to John H. Mason of the Open University, in "Review of Doing Mathematics," Math-Sci Net, MR1961400 (2004a:00011) "Not since conversations with Gian-Carlo Rota have I encountered such a sophisticated and comprehensive view of modern mathematics."
  - Krieger, Martin H. (January 15, 2015). 2015 e-book 2nd edition. World Scientific. ISBN 9789814571869.; xxiv + 467 pp.
- Urban Tomographies. Philadelphia: University of Pennsylvania Press. 2011. ISBN 978-0812204940.; xviii + 130 pp. hbk ISBN 978-0-8122-4304-8
- Doing Physics: How Physicists Take Hold of the World. Bloomington: Indiana University Press. 1992.; xx + 168 pp.
  - Krieger, Martin H. (2012). 2012 pbk 2nd edition. Indiana University Press. ISBN 978-0-253-00607-3.; xxvi + 218 pp.
- The Scholar's Survival Manual, A Road Map for Students, Faculty, and Administrators. Bloomington: Indiana University Press. 2013. ISBN 9780253010711.; xxxi + 380pp. e-book ISBN 978-0-253-01071-1
- The Thriving Professor: A Guide to a Career in Universities and Colleges. Singapore: World Scientific. 2018. ISBN 9789813237520.
