= Norman Abramson =

American engineer and computer scientist (1932–2020)

Norman M. Abramson
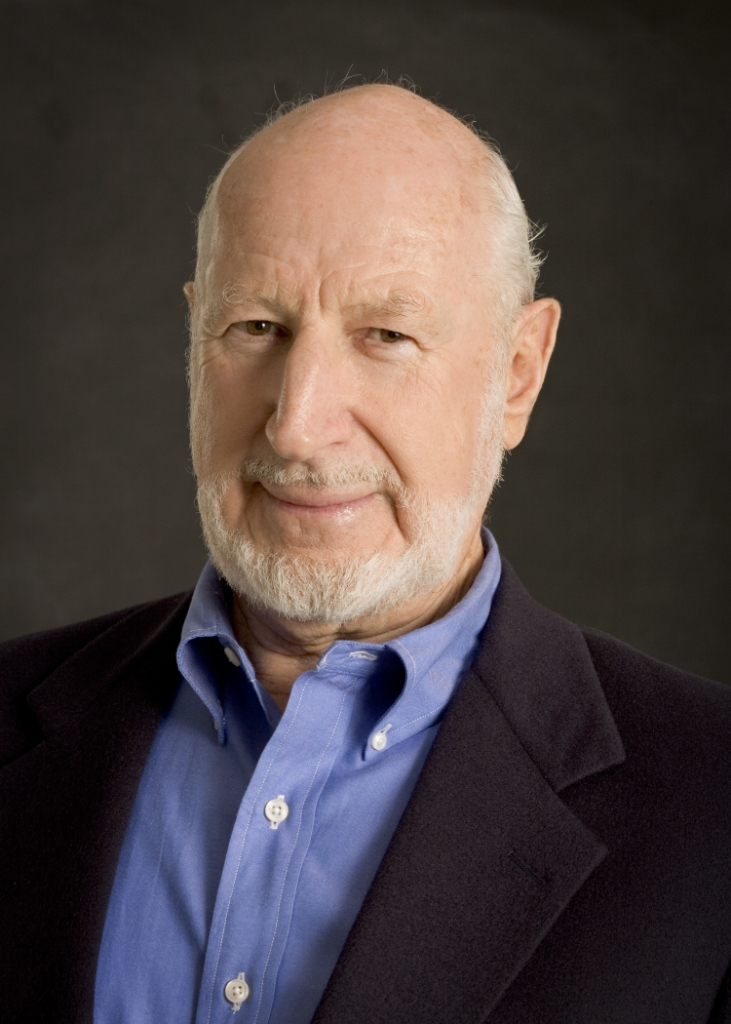
- Born: April 1, 1932; Boston, Massachusetts
- Died: December 1, 2020 (aged 88); San Francisco, California
- Education: Stanford University; Harvard College
- Awards: IEEE Alexander Graham Bell Medal (2007)
- Scientific career
- Fields: Electrical Engineering and Computer Sciences
- Workplaces: University of Hawaiʻi
- Thesis: Application of "comparison of experiments" to radar detection and coding problems (1958)
- Doctoral advisor: Willis Harman
- Doctoral students: Thomas M. Cover; Robert A. Scholtz

Norman Manuel Abramson (April 1, 1932 – December 1, 2020) was an American electrical engineer and computer scientist, most known for developing the ALOHAnet system for wireless computer communication.

== Early life ==
Abramson was born on April 1, 1932, in Boston, Massachusetts, to immigrant Jewish parents Edward and Esther. His father was born in Lithuania, and worked in commercial photography. His mother was born in Ukraine, and managed the house.

He was schooled in the Boston public schools and attended Boston Latin School and the English High School of Boston. He showed good aptitude in math and science, and he received a Bachelor of Arts in physics from Harvard College (1953), a Master of Arts in Physics from UCLA (1955), and a Ph.D. in electrical engineering from Stanford University (1958). His thesis at Stanford focused on the area of communication theory.

== Career ==
Abramson was a research engineer at the Hughes Aircraft Company until 1955, when he joined the faculty at Stanford University (1955–65), was visiting professor at University of California, Berkeley (1966), before moving to University of Hawaiʻi (1968–94), serving as professor of both Electrical Engineering and Computer Science. Some of his early research concerned radar signal characteristics and sampling theory, as well as frequency modulation and digital communication channels, error correcting codes, pattern recognition and machine learning and computing for seismic analysis.

One of Abramson's first projects at the University of Hawaiʻi was to develop radio technology to help the school send and receive data from its remote geographic location to the continental United States, funded by the Advanced Research Projects Agency. A key innovation in the technology was to divide the data in packets which could be resent if the data was lost during transmission, allowing for random access rather than sequential access, based on the same principles being developed for ARPAnet, the precursor of the modern Internet. The resulting radio network technology his team developed was deployed as ALOHAnet in 1971, based on the dual-meaning of the Hawaiian word "aloha". ALOHAnet became the foundation of modern wireless communication as well as influencing the development of Ethernet-based communications.

Abramson continued to serve as a professor at Hawaii until 1994 when he retired. Abramson went on to co-found Aloha Networks in San Francisco, where he served as a CTO.

== Personal life and death ==
Abramson had two children with his wife, Joan: a son, Mark, and a daughter, Carin. Abramson's daughter predeceased him by six years.

Abramson died on December 1, 2020, in his San Francisco home due to complications from skin cancer that had metastasized to his lungs.

== Awards ==
- 1972: IEEE Sixth Region Achievement Award for contributions to Information Theory and Coding.
- 1980: IEEE Fellow Award for development of the ALOHA-System.
- 1992: Pacific Telecommunications Council 20th Anniversary Award for leadership in the PTC.
- 1995: IEEE Koji Kobayashi Computers and Communications Award for development of the ALOHA System.
- 1998: Golden Jubilee Award for Technological Innovation from the IEEE Information Theory Society, for "the invention of the first random-access communication protocol".
- 2000: Technology Award from the German Eduard Rhein Foundation.
- 2007: IEEE Alexander Graham Bell Medal.
- 2011: C&C Prize.

== Publications ==
- Information theory and coding (McGraw-Hill, 1963)
- Computer communication networks (Prentice-Hall, 1973). Editor with Franklin F. Kuo

Awards
Preceded by John Wozencraft	IEEE Alexander Graham Bell Medal; 2007	Succeeded by Gerard J. Foschini
