= Contention-based protocol =

Communications protocol for operating wireless telecommunication equipment

A contention-based protocol (CBP) is a communications protocol for operating Wireless telecommunication equipment that allows many users to use the same radio channel without pre-coordination. The "listen before talk" operating procedure in IEEE 802.11 is the most well known contention-based protocol.

Section 90.7 of Part 90 of the United States Federal Communications Commission rules define CBP as:

A protocol that allows multiple users to share the same spectrum by defining the events that must occur when two or more transmitters attempt to simultaneously access the same channel and establishing rules by which a transmitter provides reasonable opportunities for other transmitters to operate. Such a protocol may consist of procedures for initiating new transmissions, procedures for determining the state of the channel (available or unavailable), and procedures for managing retransmissions in the event of a busy channel.

This definition was added as part of the Rules for Wireless Broadband Services in the 3650-3700 MHz Band.
