= Irena Hajnsek =

Professor of Earth Observation and Remote Sensing

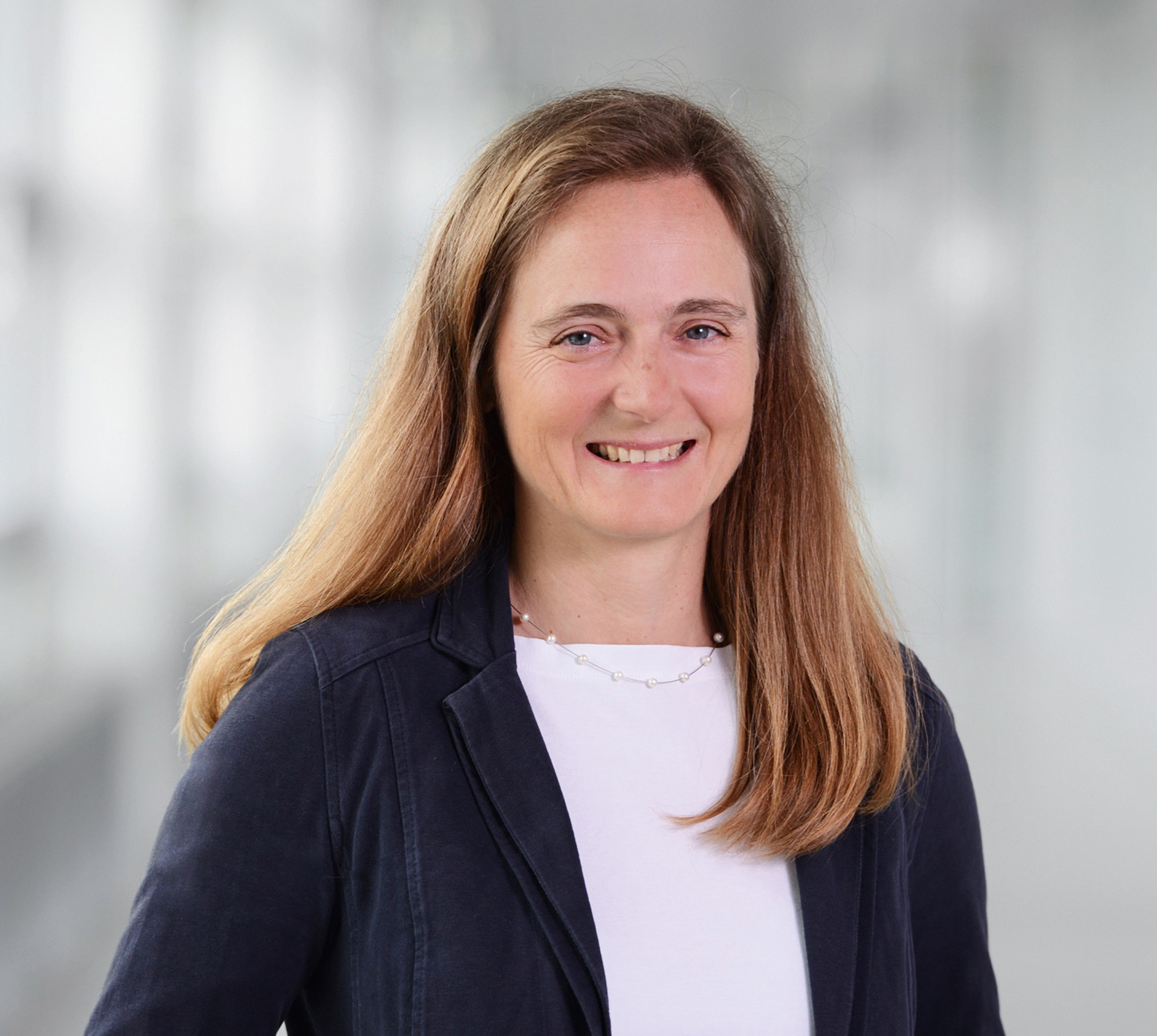
Irena Hajnšek (2020)

Irena Hajnsek is a professor of Earth Obsertvation and Remote Sensing at the Institute of Environmental Engineering, Swiss Federal Institute of Technology (ETH) Zurich and German Aerospace Center (DLR) e.V. Microwaves & Radar Institute, Wessling, Germany. She was named a Fellow of the Institute of Electrical and Electronics Engineers (IEEE) in 2014 for contributions to synthetic aperture radar imaging using airborne sensors and satellite missions.

Hajnsek obtained her diploma degree with honors from the Free University of Berlin in 1996 and in 2001 got hers doctor's degree from the University of Jena. Between 1999 and 2000, she was associated with the Institut d’Electronique et de Télécommunications de Rennes at the University of Rennes 1 and then worked at Applied Electromagnetics in St. Andrews, Scotland, specializing in EC-TMR radar polarimetry networks. She was a guest scientist at the University of Adelaide in 2005, and since 2010 serves as a coordinator for the satellite mission TanDEM-X. In 2012, Hajnsek became Technical Program Co-chair of the IEEE Geoscience and Remote Sensing Symposium, following which she became a member of the IEEE GRSS AdCom and in 2016 was elected as vice president of the IEEE GRSS Technical Committees.
