= Franklin F. Kuo =

American computer scientist (1934–2026)

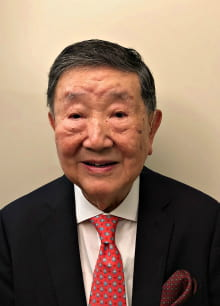
- Born: April 22, 1934; Wuhan, China
- Died: April 14, 2026 (aged 91); California, U.S.
- Education: University of Illinois Urbana-Champaign
- Spouse: Dora Kuo
- Awards: IEEE Fellow (1972)
- Scientific career
- Fields: Network Theory, Computer Networks
- Workplaces: Polytechnic Institute of Brooklyn, University of Hawaiʻi, Stanford University, Shanghai Jiaotong University, University of Mannheim
- Doctoral advisor: Mac Van Valkenburg

Franklin F. Kuo (April 22, 1934 – April 14, 2026) was an American computer scientist who was a professor in many universities – Polytechnic Institute of Brooklyn, University of Hawaiʻi, Stanford University, Jiao Tong University and University of Mannheim. He was the author of 8 books in network theory and on computer network communications. For over 40 years, he was a university professor, a research engineer, a US Defense Department manager, an Internet advisor in China, and an entrepreneur in Silicon Valley and China. He was best known as the co-developer to ALOHAnet, along with Norman Abramson, at the University of Hawaiʻi, 1969–1972.

== Early life and education ==
Kuo was born in Wuhan, China, on April 22, 1934. He arrived in the US in 1950 and finished high school in 1951 in New York City.

Kuo completed his BS, MS and PhD in electrical engineering from the University of Illinois Urbana-Champaign. His PhD advisor was Mac Van Valkenburg.

== Career ==
=== University professor ===
After earning his PhD, his first job was as assistant professor at the Polytechnic Institute of Brooklyn, where he taught undergraduate and graduate courses and worked part-time at Bell Labs in Murray Hill, NJ. In 1960, Kuo joined Bell Labs full time to concentrate on research. He worked at Bell Labs for six years and then went to work at the University of Hawaiʻi as a full professor of electrical engineering. During the period 1968–1971, he and his colleague, Norman Abramson created ALOHAnet, which used a new random-access protocol to implement the first wireless networks in the early Internet. Today the random-access protocol is used in all forms of wireless communications, including Ethernet, iPhones, Wi-Fi, and Satellite Networks. In 1971, ALOHAnet was awarded an IEEE Milestone designation.

Kuo also did important work at the University Hawaiʻi as the first director of the COSINE Committee. It was funded by the National Science Foundation to spearhead the introduction of computer engineering into the electrical engineering curriculum. The COSINE Committee, formed in 1966, recommended that electrical engineering departments develop computer engineering courses. Evidence from three surveys taken by COSINE showed the rapid growth of computer engineering since the formation of the COSINE Committee. Today, most of the former EE departments are called Electrical and Computer Engineering departments.

In 1982, Kuo left Hawaii to join SRI International in Menlo Park, California. At the same time, he became a consulting professor in the Stanford University Electrical Engineering department. In the next 16 years, Kuo was a visiting professor at 3 Chinese universities and the University of Mannheim in Germany in 1996.

=== Research Engineer and Manager ===
Kuo worked for 20 years in two major research establishments, Bell Labs, and SRI International (formerly Stanford Research Institute), and consulted in many companies, such as IBM, General Electric, the US Defense Department and Navy, and Lawrence Livermore National Laboratories. At Bell Labs he was a Member of the Technical Staff (MTS) in the Research Division working for Maurice Karnaugh. During his time at Bell Labs, Kuo published two textbooks with John Wiley & Sons: Network Analysis and Synthesis and System Analysis by Digital Computer.

In the 1980s, he led many projects in networking and information systems applications at SRI International. One of them was the first NSF project on the architecture of the NSF Network for Science and Education. The project served as the baseline for the architectural definition of NSFNET. During that period, Kuo was a member of the NSF advisory committee on supercomputer networks. For two years he served as a special consultant to the White House Office of Science and Technology Policy on the High-Performance Computing and Communications (HPCC) initiative.

=== Defense Department Manager ===
From 1975 to 1977, Kuo worked in the Pentagon as the Director of Information Systems in the Office of the Secretary of Defense. He had program oversight in computer communications applications in command, control, and intelligence.

In 1981, the Chief of Naval Operations (CNO) invited Kuo to join the CNO Executive Panel (CEP), whose members represent a cross-section of the nation's top civilian specialists. Kuo worked in the CEP for 5 years in various sub-panels.

=== Published textbooks ===
Over the years, Kuo published eight textbooks. His best book, which has been widely used worldwide, is Network Analysis and Synthesis. It was published by John Wiley and Sons, with the first edition coming out in 1962 and the second in 1966. It went through 27 printings during its 25-year lifetime. One review states, “This book is in many senses a tour de force of network analysis and synthesis.” Another one of Kuo's books is Computer-Communication Networks, published by Prentice-Hall in 1973. It was co-edited by Norman Abramson and was the first published book in computer networking. A review in IEEE Transaction of Communications states: “Few professional level books have had so profound impact. Computer-Communications Networks is a giant in its field.”

=== Advisor to China's Internet ===
In 1982, ACM sent an official delegation to China. Kuo was a member of the delegation and established relationships with members of the Chinese university computing establishment. In 1984, the World Bank invited Kuo to consult with Chinese universities to learn how to use the new Honeywell computers that World Bank had purchased. He worked with Shanghai Jiao Tong University to teach computer networking. After that time, Kuo continued his working relationship with China's networking establishment. In 1994, he was a UNESCO Lecturer in Beijing. There he helped the networks of Peking University, Tsinghua University, and the Chinese Academy of Sciences to connect to the Global Internet for the first time. He also worked with Tsinghua University to develop the Chinese Education and Research Network (CERNET). Since then, China has become one of the world's largest internet users. Kuo helped develop the early China Internet. For his work, Shanghai Jiao Tong University gave him an honorary degree.

=== Entrepreneur in Silicon Valley and China ===
In 1994, Kuo was a co-founder of General Wireless Communications, Inc. with venture capital funding. It was based in the Stanford, California area, and later moved to Santa Clara, California. Now it has been renamed Mtone Wireless Corporation, based in Beijing and Shanghai. It is a major supplier for short messaging and cellphone games in China. With his experience in venture capital, Kuo became a Mentor in Entrepreneurship in Stanford Business School from 1998- 2008. In 2006 he taught a course at Fudan University in Shanghai on Entrepreneurship.

== Death ==
Kuo died on April 14, 2026, at the age of 91.

== Books ==
Kuo wrote several books related to networks, protocols, computer communications and multimedia. Some of his texts were used as graduate textbooks at universities for teaching subjects related to computer communications and networks.

- 1962: Network Analysis & Synthesis, Wiley, (2nd Ed. 1966)
- 1966: System Analysis by Digital Computer (with James Kaiser), Wiley
- 1973: Computer Communication Networks (with N Abramson), Prentice-Hall
- 1980: Protocols and Techniques of Data Communication networks, Prentice-Hall
- 1998: Multimedia Communications, (with W. Effelsberg and JJ Garcia-Luna), Prentice-Hall

== Awards ==
- 1972: IEEE Fellow
- 1984: Honorary Professorship, Shanghai Jiaotong University
- 1984: World Bank Lecturer, Shanghai, China
- 1987: Distinguished Alumni Award, University of Illinois Alumni Association
- 1994: Honorary Professorship, Electrotechnical University, Chengdu, China
- 1994: UNESCO Lecturer, Beijing and Chengdu, China
- 1995: Alexander von Humboldt Foundation Research Award, Germany
- 2021: Professor Emeritus, University of Hawaiʻi
