= Yannis Tsividis =

Yannis Tsividis is Charles Batchelor Professor of Electrical Engineering at Columbia University. Tsividis designed and built the first integrated MOSFET operational amplifier in 1976. Tsividis is Fellow of the IEEE and received the Golden Jubilee Medal of the IEEE in 2000. He is a well known lecturer who taught over 30 classes across Columbia University, MIT, UC Berkeley and the National Technical University of Athens. He is the author of several books, including a common reference on the operation and modeling of MOS transistors.

Tsividis was elected to the National Academy of Engineering in 2019. He received his B.S. from the University of Minnesota and M.S. and Ph.D. from the University of California, Berkeley.
