= Stephen Sik-Sang Yau =

American computer scientist

Stephen Sik-Sang Yau (also known as Stephen Yau or S.S. Yau) is an American computer scientist. He is a professor of computer science and engineering at Arizona State University. He is an Elected Fellow of the American Association for the Advancement of Science and Life Fellow of the Institute of Electrical and Electronics Engineers.

== Early life and education ==
He was born on August 6, 1935, in Wuxi, Jiangsu, China. As a result of the Chinese Civil War, his family moved to Taiwan. He obtained a B.S. degree from the National Taiwan University, Taipei in 1958 in electrical engineering. He arrived in the US to join University of Illinois, Urbana-Champaign in 1958, where he obtained his Ph.D. in electrical engineering in 1961, where his advisor was Mac Van Valkenburg.

== Academic career ==
In 1961, he joined Northwestern University, Evanston, Ill. as a faculty member and later became the chair of the Department of Electrical Engineering and Computer Science there. During 1988–1994, he was with the Computer and Information Sciences Department at the University of Florida, Gainesville. He joined Arizona State University in 1994. He served as the president of the IEEE Computer Society during 1974–1975.

His first research publication was in 1962. He has continued to be an active researcher as of 2022 at age 87, with a span of 60 years. His most recent research contributions are in blockchain.

== Recognitions ==
He served as the editor-in-chief of the Computer magazine of the IEEE Computer Society during 1981–1984 and an editor of the IEEE Transactions on Software Engineering. He was awarded the Louis E. Levy Medal of the Franklin Institute, the Golden Plate Award of the American Academy of Achievement, the Richard E. Merwin Award of the IEEE Computer Society, the IEEE Centennial Medal, the IEEE Third Millennium Medal and the International Federation for Information Processing (IFIP) Silver Core Award.

== Personal life ==
He married Vickie Liu on June 14, 1964. They have two sons Andrew Yau and Philip Yau.
