= Gerhard Johannes Krieger =

German engineer

Gerhard Johannes Krieger from the German Aerospace Center (DLR), Wessling, Bavaria, Germany was named Fellow of the Institute of Electrical and Electronics Engineers (IEEE) in 2013 for contributions to advanced synthetic aperture radar systems.
