= List of Haskell Indian Nations Fighting Indians head football coaches =

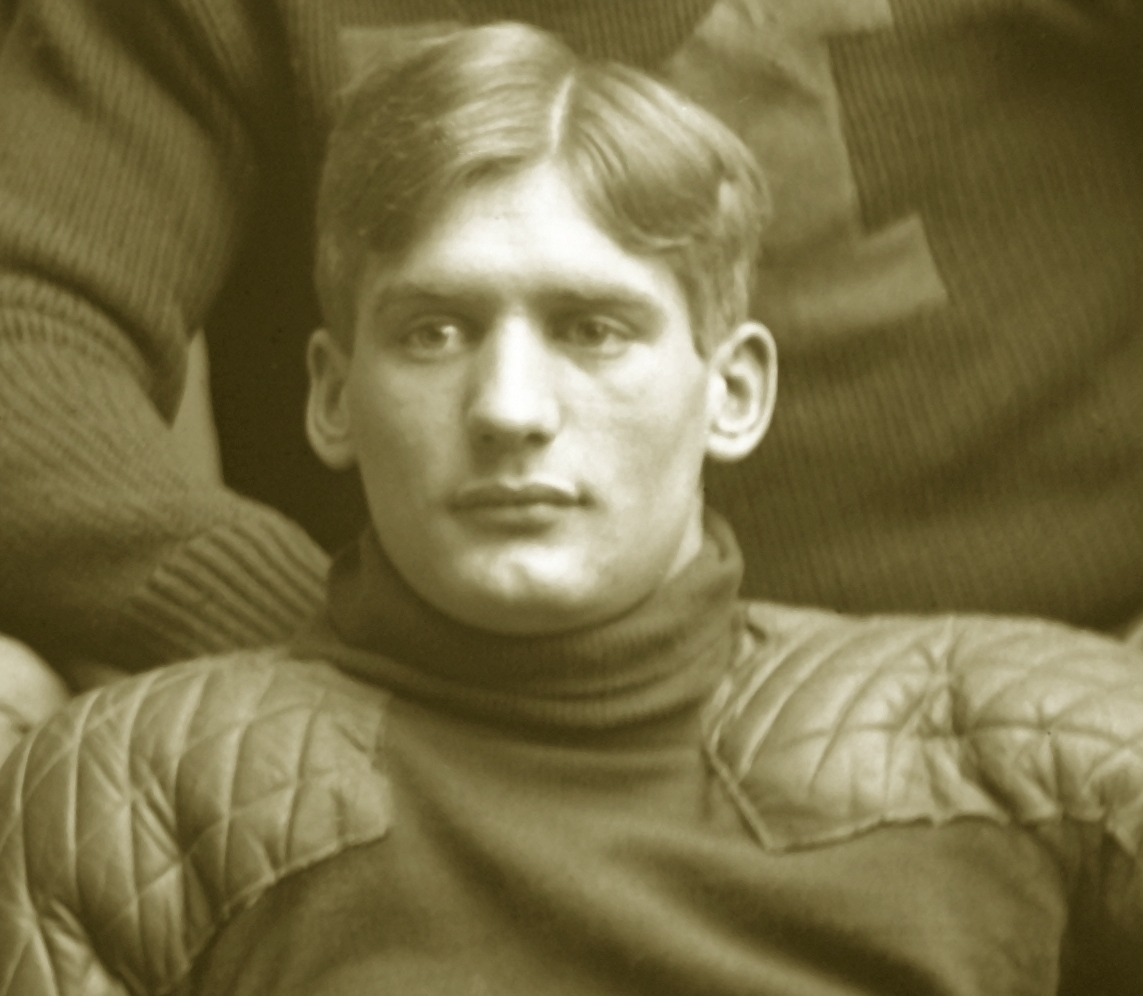
Albert E. Herrnstein was the first head coach at Haskell.

The Haskell Indian Nations Fighting Indians football program was a college football team that represented Haskell Indian Nations University. The team consisted of three coaches that have been inducted into the College Football Hall of Fame: John H. Outland, Matty Bell, and William Henry Dietz.

From 1937 until 1999, the school operated either as a high school or junior college. During this time the school fielded various football teams, but they are not listed here as being a part of the four-year college football program.

== Key ==
Key to symbols in coaches list
General		Overall		Conference		Postseason (Note: Although the first Rose Bowl Game was played in 1902, it has been continuously played since the 1916 game, and is recognized as the oldest bowl game by the NCAA. "—" indicates any season prior to 1916 when postseason games were not played.)	
No.	Order of coaches (Note: A running total of the number of head coaches, with coaches who served separate tenures being counted only once. Interim head coaches are represented with "Int" and are not counted in the running total. "—" indicates the team played but either without a coach or no coach is on record. "X" indicates an interim year without play.)	GC	Games coached	CW	Conference wins	PW	Postseason wins
DC	Division championships	OW	Overall wins	CL	Conference losses	PL	Postseason losses
CC	Conference championships	OL	Overall losses	CT	Conference ties	PT	Postseason ties
NC	National championships	OT	Overall ties (Note: Overtime rules in college football were introduced in 1996, making ties impossible in the period since.)	C%	Conference winning percentage		
†	Elected to the College Football Hall of Fame	O%	Overall winning percentage (Note: When computing the win–loss percentage, a tie counts as half a win and half a loss.)				

== Coaches ==
List of head football coaches showing season(s) coached, overall records, conference records, postseason records, championships and selected awards
No.	Name	Term	GC	OW	OL	OT	O%	CW	CL	CT	C%	PW	PL	CCs	Awards
0	Unknown	1895–1897	11	2	9	0	.182	—	—	—	—	—	—	—	
1	Sal Walker	1898	9	2	7	0	.222	—	—	—	—	—	—	—	
2	Shorty Hamill & Wylie G. Woodruff	1899	9	4	5	0	.444	—	—	—	—	—	—	—	
4	Alfred G. Ellick	1900–1901	9	1	8	0	.111	—	—	—	—	—	—	—	
5	John H. Outland^{†}	1902, 1906	18	10	7	1	.583	—	—	—	—	—	—	—	
6	Albert E. Herrnstein	1903–1904	19	15	4	0	.789	—	—	—	—	—	—	—	
7	Boyd Hill	1905	10	5	4	1	.550	—	—	—	—	—	—	—	
8	Bemus Pierce	1907	9	2	6	1	.278	—	—	—	—	—	—	—	
9	John R. Bender	1908–1909	18	10	7	1	.583	—	—	—	—	—	—	—	
10	Bill Caldwell	1910	9	2	7	0	.222	—	—	—	—	—	—	—	
11	A. R. Kennedy	1911–1915	50	31	16	3	.650	—	—	—	—	—	—	—	
12	A. M. Venne	1916	9	3	6	0	.333	—	—	—	—	—	—	—	
13	Antonio Lubo	1917	11	6	5	0	.545	—	—	—	—	—	—	—	
14	Bud Saunders	1918–1919	16	9	6	1	.594	—	—	—	—	—	—	—	
15	Matty Bell^{†}	1920–1921	15	8	6	1	.567	—	—	—	—	—	—	—	
16	Dick Hanley	1922–1926	60	47	9	4	.817	—	—	—	—	—	—	—	
17	John Webster Thomas	1927–1929	18	10	8	1	.553	—	—	—	—	—	—	—	
18	William Henry Dietz^{†}	1929–1932	38	25	12	2	.667	—	—	—	—	—	—	—	
19	Gus Welch	1933–1934	21	5	12	4	.333	—	—	—	—	—	—	—	
20	John Levi	1935	8	0	7	1	.063	—	—	—	—	—	—	—	
21	Jack Carmody	1936–1938					–	—	—	—	—	—	—	—	
X	No team	1939–1999	—	—	—	—	—	—	—	—	—	—	—	—	
22	Jerry Tuckwin	2000	10	2	8	0	.200	1	4	0	—	—	—	—	
23	Graham Snelding	2001	11	0	11	0	.000	0	4	0	—	—	—	—	
24	Eric Brock	2002–2009	82	22	60	0	.268	4	17	0	—	—	—	—	
25	Phil Homeratha	2010	10	1	9	0	.100	—	—	—	—	—	—	—	
26	Jimmy Snyder	2011–2012	20	1	19	0	.050	—	—	—	—	—	—	—	
27	Rich Brewer	2013–2014	17	1	16	0	.059	—	—	—	—	—	—		

== See also ==
- List of people from Lawrence, Kansas
