= Charles Sims =

Charles Sims may refer to:

- Charles Sims (painter) (1873–1928), British painter
- Charles Sims (mathematician) (1938–2017), American mathematician
- Charles Sims (RAF officer) (1899–1929), British World War I flying ace
- Charles Sims (American football) (born 1990), American football player
- Charles Sims (politician), in Toronto municipal elections from 1944 to 1952
- Charles Edward Sims (1925–1983), State Librarian of Kansas, 1973–1975
- Charles N. Sims (1835–1908), chancellor of Syracuse University
- Charles Sims (Surveyor General), Surveyor General of Ceylon, 1858–1865

== See also ==
- Chuck Sims (born 1958), American politician, member of the Georgia House of Representatives
- Charles Simms (disambiguation)
- Charles Sim, Australian cricketer
