= Megill =

Megill is a surname of Irish origin, being a variant of the surname McGill. Notable people with the surname include:

- Kenneth Megill (born 1939), American philosopher, trade unionist, political activist, and records and knowledge manager
- Trevor Megill (born 1993), American professional baseball pitcher
- Tylor Megill (born 1995), American professional baseball pitcher

== See also ==
- McGill (surname)
