= Charles Sim =

Australian cricketer (1895–1971)

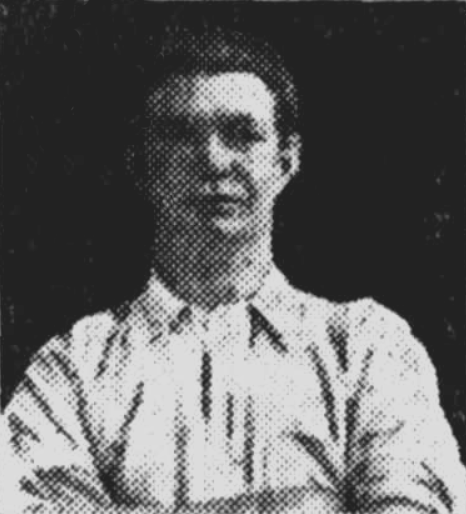

Personal information
- Full name: Charles Wallace Sim
- Born: 30 March 1895; Rockton, Queensland, Australia
- Died: 3 July 1971 (aged 76); Woodville, South Australia
- Batting: Right-handed
- Bowling: Legbreak

Domestic team information
- Years: Team
- 1925/26: Queensland
- Source: Cricinfo, 6 October 2020

Charles Sim (30 March 1895 – 3 July 1971) was an Australian cricketer who was a spin bowler. He played in four first-class matches for Queensland from 1925 to 1926.

== Cricket career ==
As of 1922 Sim was playing for Valley in Brisbane Grade Cricket bowling well with multiple deliveries. He had performed well for a few seasons and when he was omitted from the Queensland state team in November it caused some criticism of the selectors, although it was later reported that his non-selection was due to selectors being unsure of his availability at the time of matches rather than doubt in his ability.

In the 1923/24 season Sim bowled well, proving himself as a wet wicket bowler in December 1923 in a match against Toombul, and he took 7 for 35 against Woolloongabba in January 1924. Overall he took 40 wickets at an average of 12.57 for Valley in the season, and also averaged 15.36 with the bat earning praise for his all-round contributions. In November 1924 it was reported he may be selected for Queensland due to John Farquhar being dropped, and he performed well late in the 1924/25 season notably taking 7 for 19 in a match. A writeup of the season by Brisbane paper The Telegraph listed Sim as one of club crickets three most successful players, carrying Valley's bowling attack and taking 63 wickets at an average of 7.8, taking remarkable catches in the slips, and also scoring some runs when needed, and the report questioned why he had not been selected in the State team.

In November 1925 Sim participated in a cricket carnival, representing a metropolitan side against a country side, at Exhibition Ground in Brisbane and was noted to have bowled "exceptionally well" taking 8 for 66 and strengthening his chance of being selected for Queensland. He was finally selected for Queensland in December and made his debut against New South Wales in Sydney. He was mistakenly identified as Finn on the scoreboard and the crowd nicknamed him "Huckleberry". A report of the match noted he had proven himself a talented slips fielder, and he took the wickets of several good batsmen. He played three more First-class games for Queensland in the 1925/26 season and overall took 11 wickets at an average of 24.36, scored 14 runs at an average of 14.00, and took 5 catches.

In November 1926 Sim was transferred to Adelaide by the company he worked for, Kitchen & Sons, ending his State career. He had also played Australian rules football in Queensland and helped develop the sport in Queensland.

== See also ==
- List of Queensland first-class cricketers
