= List of people from Lawrence, Kansas =

This article is a list of notable people who were born in and/or have lived in Lawrence, Kansas. Alumni of University of Kansas or Haskell Indian Nations University, including athletes and coaches, who are not originally from Lawrence should not be included in this list, instead, they should be listed in List of University of Kansas people. This includes faculty and coaches who stayed in Lawrence after retirement.

== A ==
- Forrest Clare "Phog" Allen, basketball coach
- The Appleseed Cast, band
- Karole Armitage, choreographer

== B ==
- Martha Bablitch, judge
- Matt Beat, YouTuber
- Beatrice Belkin, soprano
- Leo Beuerman, pencil salesman, subject of a 1969 short film nominated for an Academy Award
- Amani Bledsoe, professional football player
- David Booth, entrepreneur
- Ronald T. Borchardt, pharmaceutical chemist
- Corinne Brinkerhoff, television producer and writer
- Erin Brockovich, environmental activist
- George Brown, politician
- William Burroughs, author
- Sarah Buxton, singer

== C ==
- Dorothy Canfield Fisher, author
- Danny Carey, musician, drummer for Tool
- Judge Louis Carpenter, judge and lawyer, murdered in Lawrence Massacre on August 21, 1863
- Cattle Annie, bandit born in Lawrence in 1882
- Paul Coker Jr., illustrator, Mad Magazine and Rankin-Bass

== D ==
- Karen Dalton, musician
- George Docking, politician
- Robert Docking, politician

== E ==
- Bart D. Ehrman, scholar, author
- Loren Eiseley, anthropologist, author
- Michael S. Engel, scholar, paleontologist, entomologist
- Ronald Evans, NASA astronaut (Pathfinder to the Stars)

== F ==
- Mike Finnigan, musician
- Marci Francisco, politician
- Thomas Frank, author

== G ==
- Robert L. Gernon, jurist
- The Get Up Kids, rock band
- Edward C. Gleed, U.S. Army Air Force officer with the famed Buffalo Soldiers/9th Cavalry Regiment (United States) and Tuskegee Airmen

== H ==
- John Hadl, NCAA and NFL football quarterback, College Football Hall of Fame
- Zach Hadel, co-creator of Smiling Friends
- William A. Harris, U.S. senator
- Herk Harvey, actor, director, producer, writer
- John G. Haskell, architect of numerous Lawrence buildings as well as the Kansas State Capitol
- Bobby Henrich, MLB player
- Stan Herd, crop artist
- Ralph Houk, MLB pitcher and manager
- Henry Salem Hubbell, Impressionist painter
- Isaac F. Hughes, city council member in Lawrence and in Los Angeles, California
- Langston Hughes, poet and author
- Kelley Hunt, blues singer, pianist, songwriter

== J ==
- Bill James, baseball statistician and author
- Steve Jeltz, professional baseball player
- Patty Jenkins, film writer and director

== K ==
- Tom Keegan, sportswriter
- Maggie Koerth-Baker, science journalist and blogger

== L ==
- Jon Lemmon, footballer

== M ==
- Deane Waldo Malott, university president
- Danny Manning, professional basketball player, college basketball coach
- Mates of State, rock band
- Mark Maxey, filmmaker
- David McClain, university president
- Elmer McCollum, scientist
- Minus Story, band
- Na Mira, artist
- Bryce Montes de Oca, baseball player for the New York Mets
- Jason Moss, musician
- Alan Mulally, business executive, CEO of Ford Motor Corporation

== N ==
- James Naismith, inventor of basketball, coach, instructor
- Devin Neal, running back at the University of Kansas
- Bill Nieder, track and field athlete (shot put), won silver medal at 1956 Summer Olympics and gold in 1960 Summer Olympics, set three shot put world records

== O ==
- Marcus Oliveria, boxer

== P ==
- Sara Paretsky, novelist
- Paw, rock band
- Ryan Pope, musician (The Get Up Kids)
- Carl Adolph Preyer, music instructor and composer
- Matthew Pryor, musician (The Get Up Kids)

== R ==
- Charles L. Robinson, first governor of Kansas
- Sara Tappan Doolittle Robinson, writer, historian, First Lady of Kansas

== S ==
- Paschal Salisbury, first African-American Dominican priest
- Kliph Scurlock, drummer of The Flaming Lips
- Stanley Sheldon, bass player for Peter Frampton
- Stephen Six, attorney general of Kansas
- Gary Mark Smith, street photographer, author
- Split Lip Rayfield, band
- Sri Srinivasan, U.S. federal judge
- William A. Starrett (1877–1932), builder who constructed the Empire State Building
- Robby Steinhardt, violinist, vocalist with band Kansas

== T ==
- Solon O. Thacher, judge and politician

== W ==
- John Allen Wakefield, political and military leader
- George Walker, African-American vaudeville actor
- Donald Worster, environmental historian, author
- Henry Wright, planner and architect

== Y ==
- Jeff Yagher, actor

== See also ==
- List of lists of people from Kansas
- List of University of Kansas people
- List of Haskell Indian Nations Fighting Indians head football coaches
- List of Kansas Jayhawks head football coaches
