= William Martin Haenke =

Australian architect and mine owner

- Born: 1875; Walloon, Queensland
- Died: 1953 (aged 77–78)
- Other names: Martin William Haenke
- Occupations: architect, mine owner

William Martin Haenke (1875-1953) was an Australian architect and mine owner.

== Early life ==
William Martin Haenke (also referred to as Martin William Haenke) was born in Walloon, Queensland in 1875, the elder son of Polish emigrant Johann Wilhelm Haenke, a blacksmith, and his wife Friedericke. He attended West Ipswich State School and was then articled as a clerk to the Ipswich architect Henry E. Wyman in 1891. He later moved to Melbourne, where he was employed by architects Lloyd Tayler and Fitts, worked on jobs for the Metropolitan Board of Works and completed his architectural studies in 1899. Haenke was an early proponent of the California bungalow style in Queensland. Haenke returned to Queensland in 1900 and began taking shares in the Rhondda Colliery at Redbank as well as in mines in Bundamba, Rosewood, the Darling Downs and in mines in Central Queensland.

== Coal mining investment ==
He and colleagues William Andrews and Thomas Murray set up Rosewood Colleries Ltd in 1904. He became secretary of Rhondda colliery in 1913 which bought Good Hope Mine and attempted to mine the gas-coal seam. When this proved unsuccessful he became the secretary of the Westvale Collieries Ltd, which ran Perry’s Nob Mine at Rosewood. He took out prospecting licences near Takura in 1924 and was briefly involved in Dundee Colliery. He was the owner of the Balgowan Colliery.

Haenke was a director of the Blair Athol Open Cut Colliery from 1939-1949.

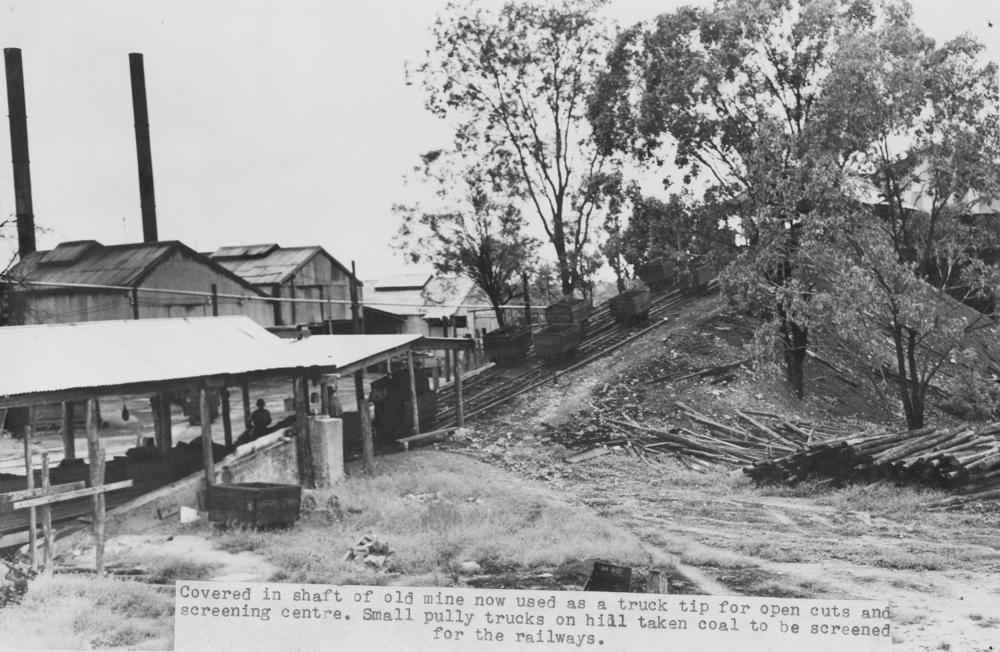
Mine buildings at Blair Athol, 1950, Photo from State Library Queensland 2 154507

He also served on the Queensland Coal Owners Association and was a Chairman of the Colliery Proprietors Council and Noblevale Collieries Pty Ltd. He was the owner of Lowfield No.2 mine in Rosewood in 1944 where there was a fatality. Haenke's health began to fail in 1949. He died in 1953. He was survived by his wife and two children.

== Personal life ==
Haenke married Laura Taylor in Ipswich in 1908.

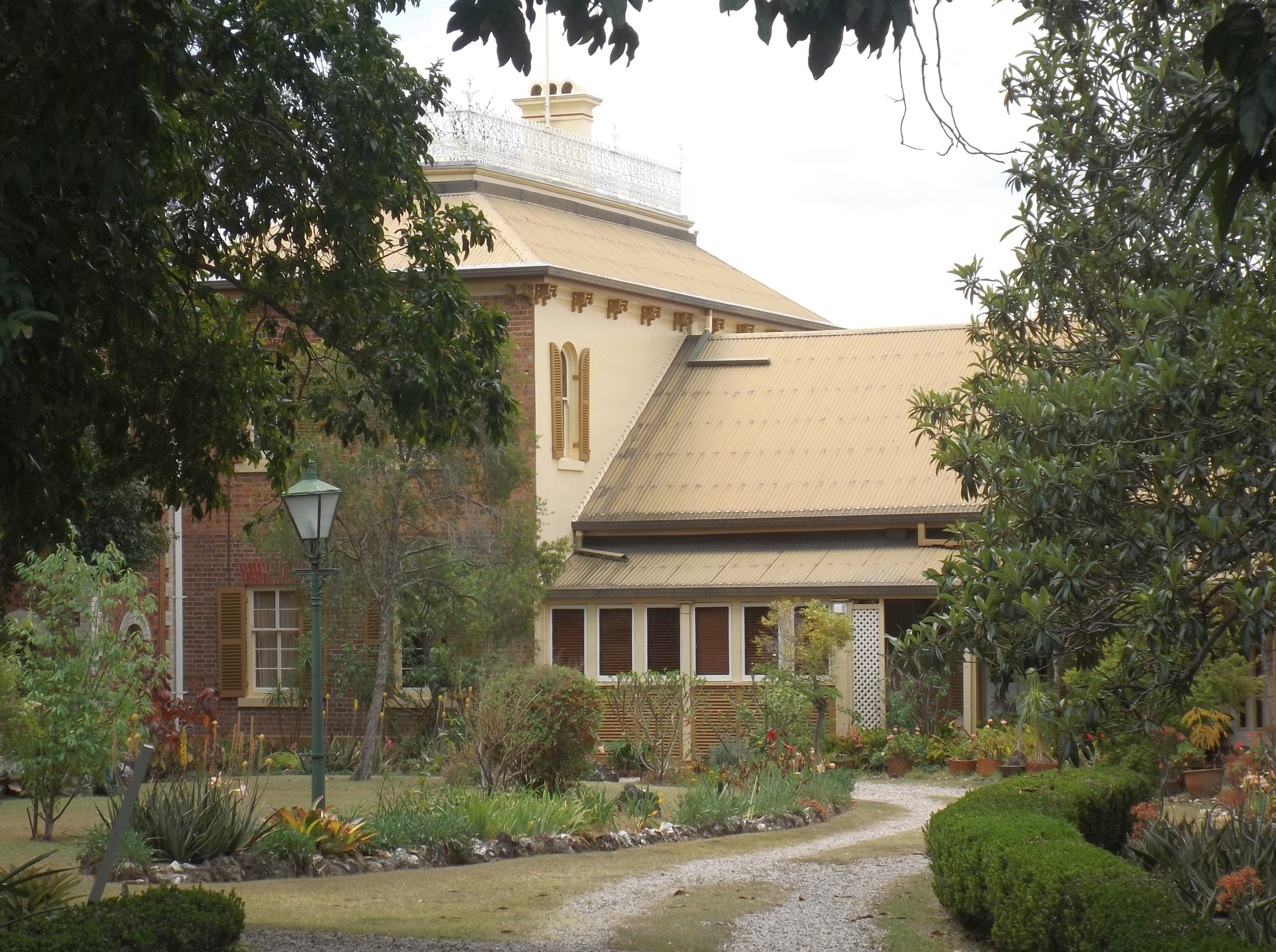
Rockton driveway, East Ipswich

They bought a house and land in Rockton Street, East Ipswich. They made extensive repairs to the house which is now on the Queensland Heritage Register. The defunct M.W. Haenke No.1 and No. 2 Mines (New Hope) were named in his honour. 15 boxes of his papers relating to his legacy in the mining history of South East Queensland are held in the Fryer Library at The University of Queensland.

== Notable architectural work ==
- Boobeebie
- Blackstone Congregational Church
- Rising Sun Hotel, Rosewood
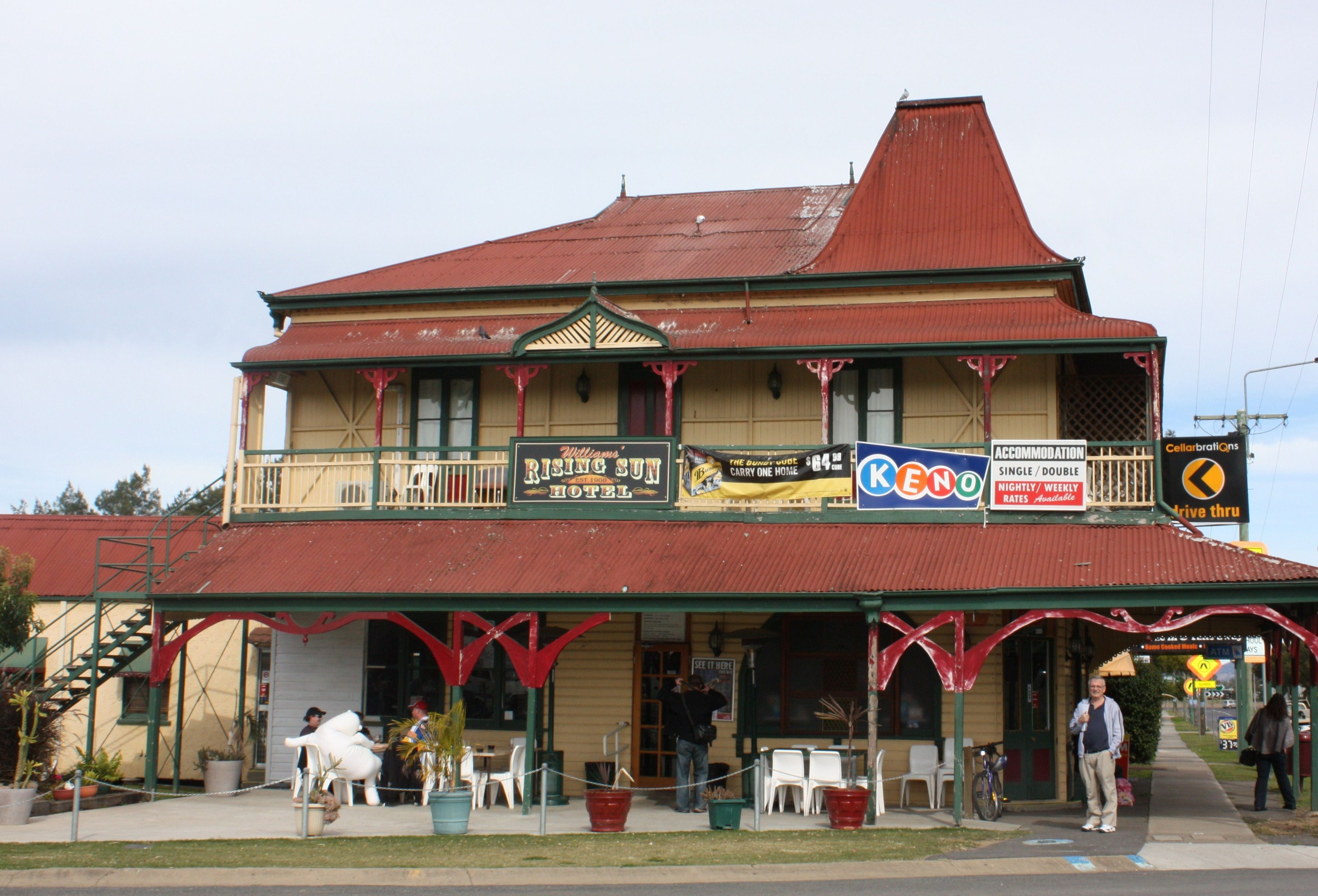
  Rising Sun Hotel, Rosewood, Queensland
- Whitehouse's Bakery, Laidley
- Hotel Grande, Ipswich
- North Ipswich Ice Works
- Meiringen, Eastern. Heights
