= Charles Simms =

Charles Simms may refer to:

- Charles Carroll Simms (1824–1884), American naval officer
- Charles Simms (gymnast) (1928-2003), American gymnast
- Charles Simms (lawyer) (1755–1819), American lawyer and politician
- Charlie Simms (1859–1935), English footballer

== See also ==
- Charles Sims (disambiguation)
