= Upfor Gallery =

Coordinates: 45°31′35.9″N 122°40′50.2″W

- Established: 2013
- Location: Portland, Oregon, United States
- Type: Contemporary art gallery
- Website: upforgallery.com

Upfor was an American contemporary art gallery based in Portland, Oregon, United States, that presented primary market artworks by early and mid-career artists.

== History ==
The gallery opened in 2013 at 929 NW Flanders Street in Portland, moved to an online-only model in 2020 and closed later that year. In its single exhibition space of 1,700 square feet (160 m^{2}), the gallery typically mounted six to ten full-scale exhibitions per year. The gallery also participated in art fairs in the United States and internationally The gallery was founded by Theo Downes-Le Guin, a former high technology marketing executive with an academic background in art history and sociology, and son of noted science fiction author Ursula K. Le Guin.

== Artists ==
Upfor’s early artistic program emphasized artists who focus on contemporary media culture; exhibited artworks often included a technology or digital component in their making and presentation. Artists that Upfor represented exclusively or in conjunction with other galleries were MSHR, Ben Buswell, Rodrigo Valenzuela, Heidi Schwegler, Srijon Chowdhury, Morehshin Allahyari, Ronny Quevedo and Julie Green. Other notable artists who exhibited at Upfor included Frances Stark, whose feature-length video work My Best Thing was Upfor's inaugural exhibition in 2013 , and artist Ryan Trecartin, who in 2014 screened the video Center Jenny.
