= Helen Haenke =

Australian artist, poet and playwright

- Born: 9 May 1916; Wickham, New South Wales, Australia
- Died: 7 December 1978 (aged 62); Ipswich, Queensland, Australia
- Occupations: Poet and playwright

Helen Haenke (1916–1978) was an Australian artist, poet and playwright whose work was part of an emerging literary community in southeast Queensland in the late 1960s and 1970s.

== Early life ==
Haenke was born Helen Joyce Petherbridge on 9 May 1916 at Wickham, New South Wales, the daughter of Dr. Walter Petherbridge and his wife, Lily. She was educated at the Methodist Ladies' College in Burwood. She trained as a commercial artist at East Sydney Technical College and studied painting under Max Meldrum in Melbourne. She was interested in many aspects of design. She married Willis Lynn Haenke, a Queensland industrial chemist, in 1937 in Petersham, Sydney. Her husband was involved with munitions production during World War II. They returned to Queensland in 1943 to help run the family's coal mining interests in Ipswich, including Rhondda Colliery. They moved into the Haenke family home, Rockton, in 1953. Rockton would become a popular venue for recitals, concerts and play readings. Haenke continued to work on her art, specialising in still life, portraiture and domestic scenes. An exhibition of her work was held in 2009 at the Redland Bay Art Gallery.

== Writing career ==
Haenke began contributing prose and poetry to newspaper and literary magazines from the 1930s. Many of her short stories were published in the Australian Women's Weekly in the 1950s. She also published under the pseudonym, 'Winkle' and 'Inglewick'. She won an award in an Ipswich drama competition for her unpublished play, Truth to tell in 1960. Many of her poems and short stories were published in the journal Southerly. Her first published poem won a Courier Mail competition in 1965. She wrote a number of one act plays in the late 1960s, including Black Out (1967), First Performance, In Memoriam, Late Warning and Return to the Fray. She also wrote the libretto for an opera, The Pied Piper, which was performed in Brisbane in 1971. Her one act play, Firebug was performed at the Brisbane Warana Festival in 1978. It was published in the collection, Three Queensland One-Act Plays for Festivals (1978). She wrote the full length plays, Summer Solstice (original title Under the bridge), which was performed by the Brisbane Arts Theatre in 1964, The Bottom of a Birdcage (original title Emoh Ruo) was performed in 1976. Her last play, The Passage was performed by the Ipswich Little Theatre in 1978.

== Publications ==
The Good Company (1977) – poetry anthology

The Bottom of a Birdcage (1978) – two-act play

Prophets and Honour (1979) – poetry anthology

== Memberships ==
Foundation member, Ipswich Forum Club

Ipswich Business and Professional Women's Association

Member, Australian Society of Authors

Board member, Ipswich Girls Grammar School

== Legacy ==
Haenke died on 7 December 1978 in Ipswich. She was survived by her husband and three daughters. Haenke's unpublished manuscripts, poems and other writings are held in the University of Queensland Fryer Library. A book celebrating Haenke's life was published in 2017, Helen Haenke at Rockton: a creative life.
