= Mark A. Huselid =

American professor and workforce management specialist

Mark A. Huselid (born 1961) is a university professor, workforce management specialist, book author, and business consultant. He is the Distinguished Professor of Workforce Analytics at D'Amore-McKim School of Business, Northeastern University. He has authored research papers and books regarded as seminal to establishing a strategic link between human resource management and business performance.

== Education ==
Huselid graduated with a B.A. in psychology from California State University, Fresno. He also received an M.A. in industrial and organizational psychology, and MBA, both from the University of Kansas, and a PhD in organization and human resources from the State University of New York at Buffalo in 1993.

== Career ==
Huselid was a Distinguished Professor of Human Resource Strategy in the School of Management and Labor Relations (SMLR) at Rutgers University, where he worked from 1992 to 2014. In 2014 he was further named a Distinguished Professor of Workforce Analytics at D'Amore-McKim School of Business, Northeastern University, and the Director of its Center for Workforce Analytics. He was Editor of Human Resource Management, the journal of the Society for Human Resource Management from 2000 to 2004.

He was elected a Fellow of the National Academy of Human Resources, NAHR (2016), a Fellow of the Association for Psychological Science (2017), and a Fellow of the Society for Industrial and Organizational Psychology (2017).

He has been a frequent speaker to professional and academic audiences worldwide.

His research program focuses on balanced measurement systems for business success. They reflect the contribution of the workforce to the business's success.

== Research ==
Huselid's research papers have been cited over 40,000 times according to Google Scholar. He has authored some of the most frequently cited articles in the history of Academy of Management Journal. According to reviewers, Huselid's academic writings played a pioneering role in validating a link between HRM practices and business productivity, particularly in the US.

=== Most cited papers ===
- Huselid, Mark A. "The impact of human resource management practices on turnover, productivity, and corporate financial performance". The Academy of Management Journal. 38 (3): 635–672. Cited 13987 times.
- Delaney, John T.; Huselid, Mark A. (August 1996). "The Impact of Human Resource Management Practices on Perceptions of Organizational Performance". Academy of Management Journal. 39 (4): 949–969. doi:10.5465/256718. ISSN 0001-4273. Cited 4954 times.
- Huselid, Mark A.; Jackson, Susan E.; Schuler, Randall S. (February 1997). "Technical and Strategic Human Resources Management Effectiveness as Determinants of Firm Performance". Academy of Management Journal. 40 (1): 171–188. doi:10.5465/257025. ISSN 0001-4273. Cited 3140 times.
- Becker, Brian E.; Huselid, Mark A. (December 2006). "Strategic Human Resources Management: Where Do We Go From Here?". Journal of Management. 32 (6): 898–925. doi:10.1177/0149206306293668. ISSN 0149-2063. S2CID 13040957. Cited 2155 times.

== Books ==
- Becker, Brian E; Huselid, Mark A; Ulrich, David (2001). The HR scorecard: linking people, strategy, and performance. Boston, Mass.: Harvard Business School Press. ISBN 978-1-57851-136-5. OCLC 248548335..
- Huselid, Mark A; Becker, Brian E; Beatty, Richard W (2015). The Workforce Scorecard Managing Human Capital To Execute Strategy. Harvard Business Review Press. ISBN 978-1-63369-059-2. OCLC 1016145506.
- Becker, Brian E; Beatty, Richard W; Huselid, Mark A (2009). The differentiated workforce: transforming talent into strategic impact. Boston, Mass.: Harvard Business Press. ISBN 978-1-4221-0446-0. OCLC 473657314.

The publication of a new book by Huselid, Disrupting Workforce Competition: Executing Strategy through Workforce Analytics, has been announced.

== Awards ==
- Academy of Management Journal's Best Paper Award (1995).
- Academy of Management's Scholarly Achievement Award in Human Resource Management (1996).
- Journal of Management's Best Paper Award (2011)
- State University of New York at Buffalo School of Management Distinguished Alumnus Award (2012).
- Academy of Management's Best Paper award in human resource management (2017).
