= Perry Alexander =

American computer scientist and electrical engineer

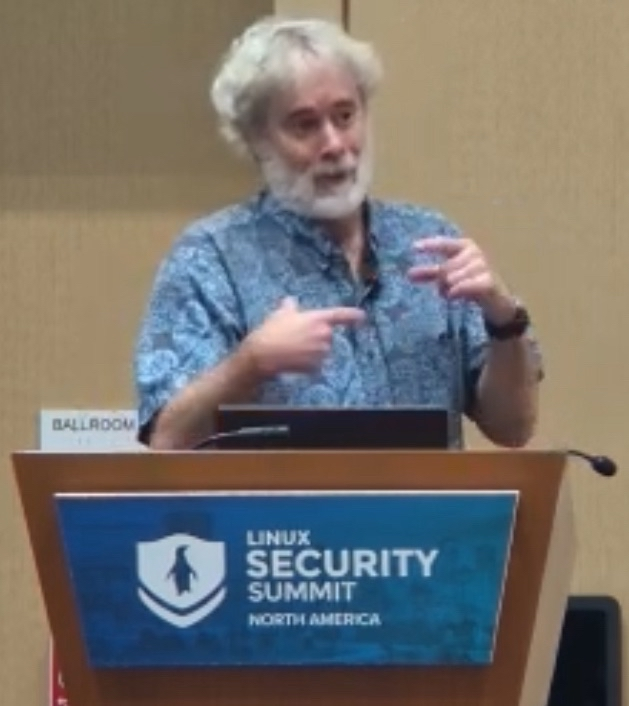
- Alexander in 2025
- Education: University of Kansas
- Occupations: Computer scientist, electrical engineer

Perry Alexander is an American computer scientist and electrical engineer. He is the AT&T Foundation Distinguished Professor in the department of electrical engineering and computer science at the University of Kansas.
