= Heidi Schwegler =

American artist (born 1967)

Heidi Schwegler (born 1967 in San Antonio, Texas) is an American artist in Yucca Valley, California.

== Biography ==
Schwegler received her BFAs in Art History and Metals from the University of Kansas and her MFA from the University of Oregon.

Schwegler is the founder of the Yucca Valley Material Lab, a space for thinking and making. From 2015 to 2018 she was the Chair of the Masters in Fine Arts Program in Applied Craft and Design, a program jointly offered by Pacific Northwest College of Art and Oregon College of Art and Craft. Schwegler has been included in the 2018 Bellevue Art Museum Biennial, Portland2016 Biennial, the Portland2010 Biennial, and the Oregon Biennial in 1999.

In interviews, Schwegler has expressed "an affinity for the ruin, non-sites and discarded objects". Schwegler calls herself "an urban archaeologist" who prefers "to mine the peripheral ruin, the discarded stuff that is ignored and considered worthless. By reassigning the value and purpose of something recognizable, I emphasize the perforation between what it was and what it has now become." Pulling from the traditions of craft and conceptual art, Schwegler uses a variety of mediums, including glass, metal, sculpture, photography, and installation.

Schwegler is represented by UPFOR Gallery in Portland, Oregon and Asphodel in New York City.

== Selected solo exhibitions ==
- On Gurgling, William Benington Gallery, London, 2018
- My Enemy, Asphodel, New York, NY, 2017
- Extinction Anxiety, Upfor Gallery, Portland, Oregon, 2017
- Botched Execution, The Art Gym, Marylhurst University, 2015
- Uncommon Likeness: Identity in Flux, Sheldon Museum of Art, NE, 2016
- Wrest_01, Gray Box, University of Oregon, Portland, Oregon, 2015
- Lunch, Soil Gallery, Seattle, Washington, 2015

== Selected group exhibitions ==
- The future has no presence, Asphodel, New York, NY 2018
- Teeth and Consequence, Private Places, Portland, Oregon 2018
- Portland2016 Biennial, Disjecta, Portland, Oregon, 2016
- November's Bone, Halsey McKay Gallery, New York, NY, 2016
- Portland2010 Biennial, Disjecta, Portland, Oregon, 2010
- Oregon Biennial, Portland Art Museum, 1999
- April Meetings New Media Festival, Belgrade, Serbia, 2014
- Group Show, Mas Attack Series, Torrance Art Museum, California, 2014
- Hallie Ford Fellows Group Show, Museum of Contemporary Craft, Portland, Oregon, 2013
- Imposter’, RAID Projects, Los Angeles, California, 2011

== Awards ==
- Yaddo Residency, 2016
- MacDowell Colony Fellowship, 2010, 2018
- Artist Fellowship, Oregon Arts Commission (2010, 2018)
- Project Grant, Regional Arts and Culture Council (2007, 2010, 2013, 2015, 2018)
- Career Opportunity Grant, Oregon Arts Commission (2010, 2013, 2014, 2016, 2018)
- Klaus Moje Award 2017
- Emergency Grant, Foundation for Contemporary Arts, NY 2016
- Hallie Ford Fellowship, 2010
- Finalist, Contemporary NW Art Awards, Portland Museum, 2010
