= Jerry Tuckwin =

American football coach

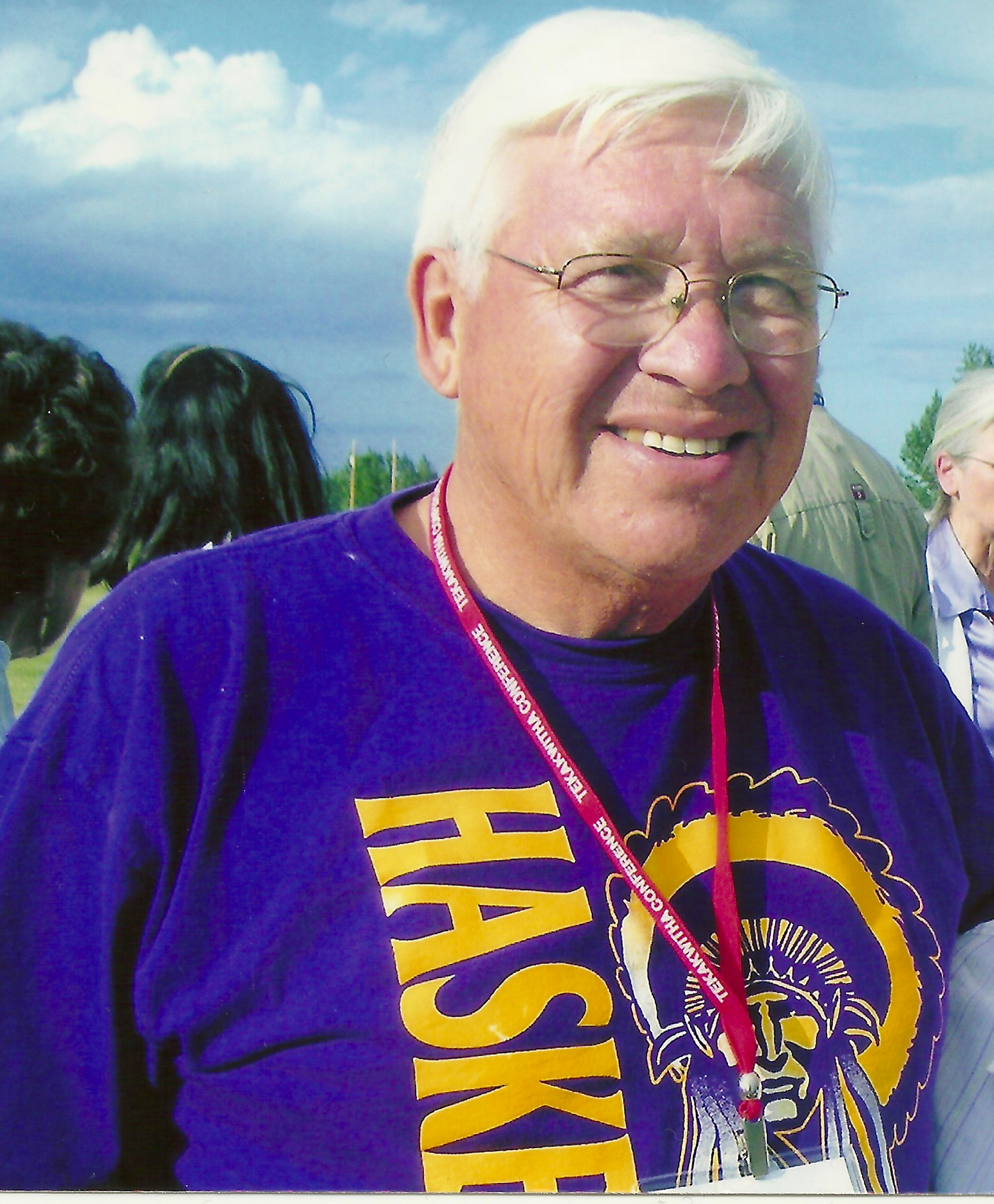
- Tuckwin in 2008

Coaching career (HC unless noted)
- 2000: Haskell Indian Nations

Head coaching record
- Overall: 2–8

Jerry Tuckwin is an American football coach. Tuckwin was the head football coach for the Haskell Indian Nations University in Lawrence, Kansas for the 2000 season. His coaching record at Haskell Indian Nations was 2–8.
