= John Farquhar (Australian cricketer) =

Australian cricketer

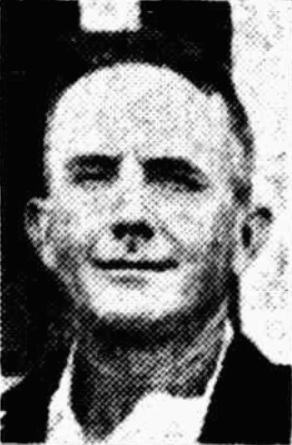

Personal information
- Born: 30 January 1887; Home Hill, Queensland, Australia
- Died: 31 July 1977 (aged 90); Chermside, Queensland, Australia
- Source: Cricinfo, 3 October 2020

John Farquhar (30 January 1887 – 31 July 1977) was an Australian cricketer. He played in sixteen first-class matches for Queensland between 1913 and 1927.

== See also ==
- List of Queensland first-class cricketers
