= Rockton, Ipswich =

Rockton
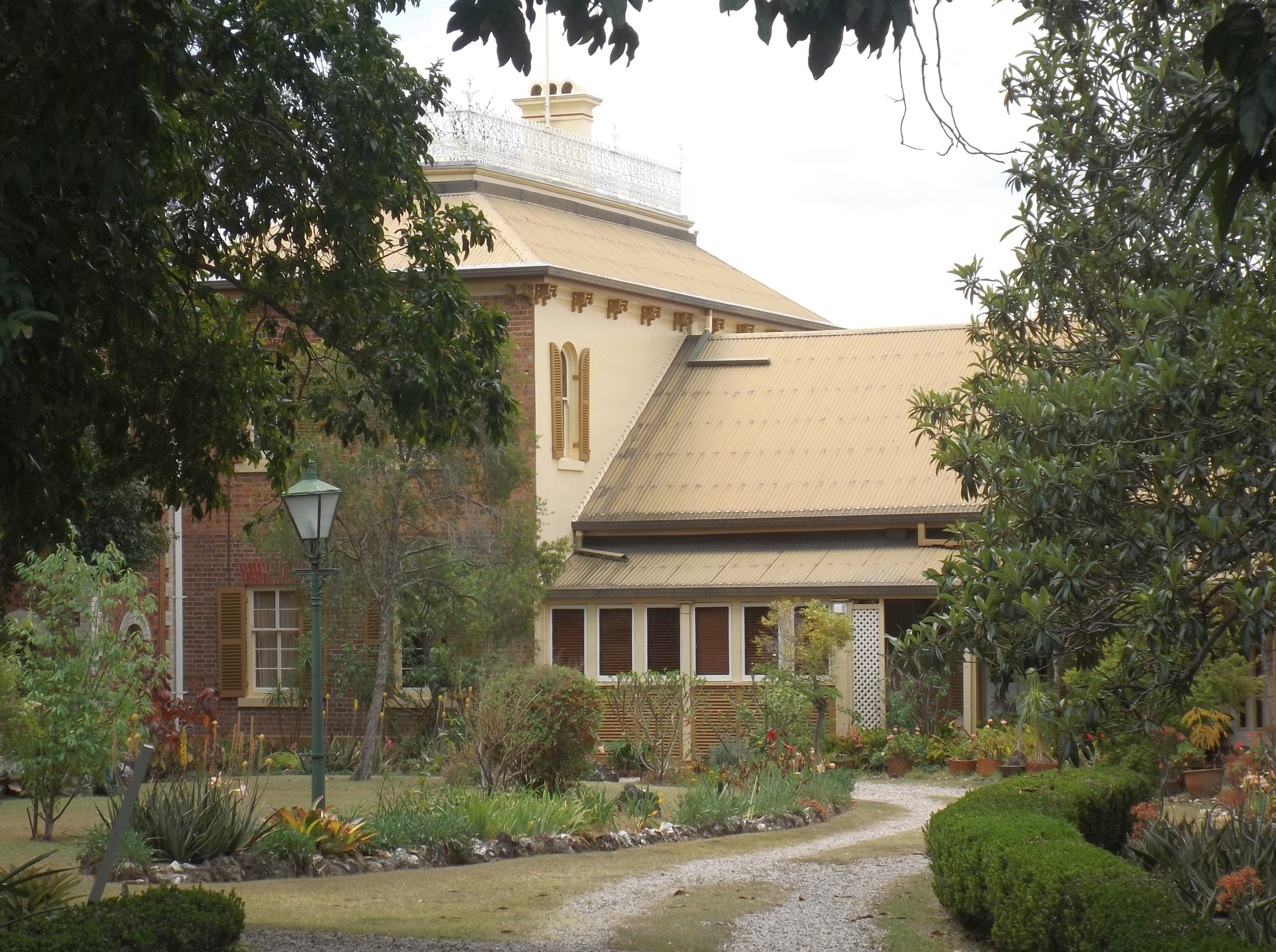
- Residence in 2015

- Location within Queensland Location within Australia
- 27.6162°S 152.7721°E
- Location: Rockton Street, Newtown, City of Ipswich, Queensland, Australia

History
- Design period: 1840s–1860s (mid-19th century)
- Built: 1855–

Queensland Heritage Register
- Official name: Rockton
- Type: state heritage (built, landscape)
- Designated: 21 October 1992
- Reference no.: 600552
- Significant period: 1850s, late 19th century, c. 1900 (fabric); 1850s (historical)
- Significant components: carriage way/drive, trees/plantings, wall/s, garden – bed/s, swimming pool, fernery, ballroom, residential accommodation – main house, garden/grounds, billiards room

Rockton is a heritage-listed villa at Rockton Street, Newtown, City of Ipswich, Queensland, Australia. It was built from 1855 onwards. It was added to the Queensland Heritage Register on 21 October 1992.

== History ==
Rockton is a substantial brick house, the first section of which was built as a cottage for bank manager William Craies and his wife Sabina in 1855. The cottage was progressively extended and altered by successive owners over a long period, producing a complex but surprisingly harmonious house with great character.

In the 1850s, Craies was commuting between Ipswich and Brisbane as manager of the branches of the Bank of New South Wales in both towns. He then resigned and came to work full-time in Ipswich as a partner with the merchant Walter Gray and Co. To quickly provide accommodation for his family in Ipswich, he built a three-room cottage in 1855 on 7ha of land he already owned on Limestone ridge overlooking the town. The cottage faced north, had two fireplaces, a boxroom at each end and a verandah back and front. Behind it to the south was a detached kitchen and bath house.

The cottage was extended within the year by builder William Hancock. Craies sold the house in 1862 because of financial difficulties associated with the collapse of Walter Gray and Co and it was then described as "a good substantial edifice built of bricks with shingled roof and containing front and side and back verandahs, entrance hall, dining room, drawing room, four bedrooms, nursery, pantry, store-room, kitchen, servants room and wash house." There were also several outbuildings, a lawn, garden and kitchen garden, a vineyard of 2000 vines and paddocks for horses and a cow. At this time, the house was considered to be a "country residence", although only 2 kilometres (1.2 mi) from the centre of Ipswich. The purchaser was Robert Towns who rented it. The next owner, in 1873, was Samuel Hodgson.

The house was occupied by the Bullmore family in 1877 and purchased by them in 1882, after which it was again extended. The Bullmores had several daughters who attended the nearby Ipswich Girls' Grammar School after it was established in 1892 and the house was extended for family accommodation and entertaining. A breezeway between two wings was enclosed to form a ballroom and an upper storey was added to the northern end with a "widow's walk" on top. About 1900, the roof was changed to corrugated galvanised iron, a verandah was built onto the upstairs section on the north side and a tower was built, possibly designed by George Brockwell Gill. Bullmore was notable for his establishment of Trelawney Dairy near Harrisville which had associated butter and cheese factories.

In 1918, Will and Laura Haenke bought the house which by then was in bad state of repair and some of the original land had been sold. Haenke was an architect and later became a coal-mine owner, associated with Rhondda Colliery. He relocated the kitchen which had been in the original cottage wing to a position in the "join" of the cottage and the main building, requiring changes to the adjacent verandahs. Haenke also imposed 1930s details such as doorways and a large bay window in the living area. A formal garden was continued during this time and major trees were retained. A swimming pool was built in 1953.

In 1945, a separate residential area was created on the northern side for Haenke's son Willis and his wife Helen who inherited the property when Will died in 1953. Willis continued the family interest in coalmining and Helen was a writer who published several books of poetry and wrote several plays which were performed in Brisbane and Ipswich. Today, Rockton is owned by their daughter Angela and her husband Wybe Geertsma.

Outbuildings remaining today consist of an early billiard room, a brick outbuilding which was converted into a fernery in the 1930s and new garages built to a design by Buchanan Architects c. 1980. The garden contains very large mature trees including Moreton Bay figs and several limestone walls, as well as formal garden beds.

== Description ==
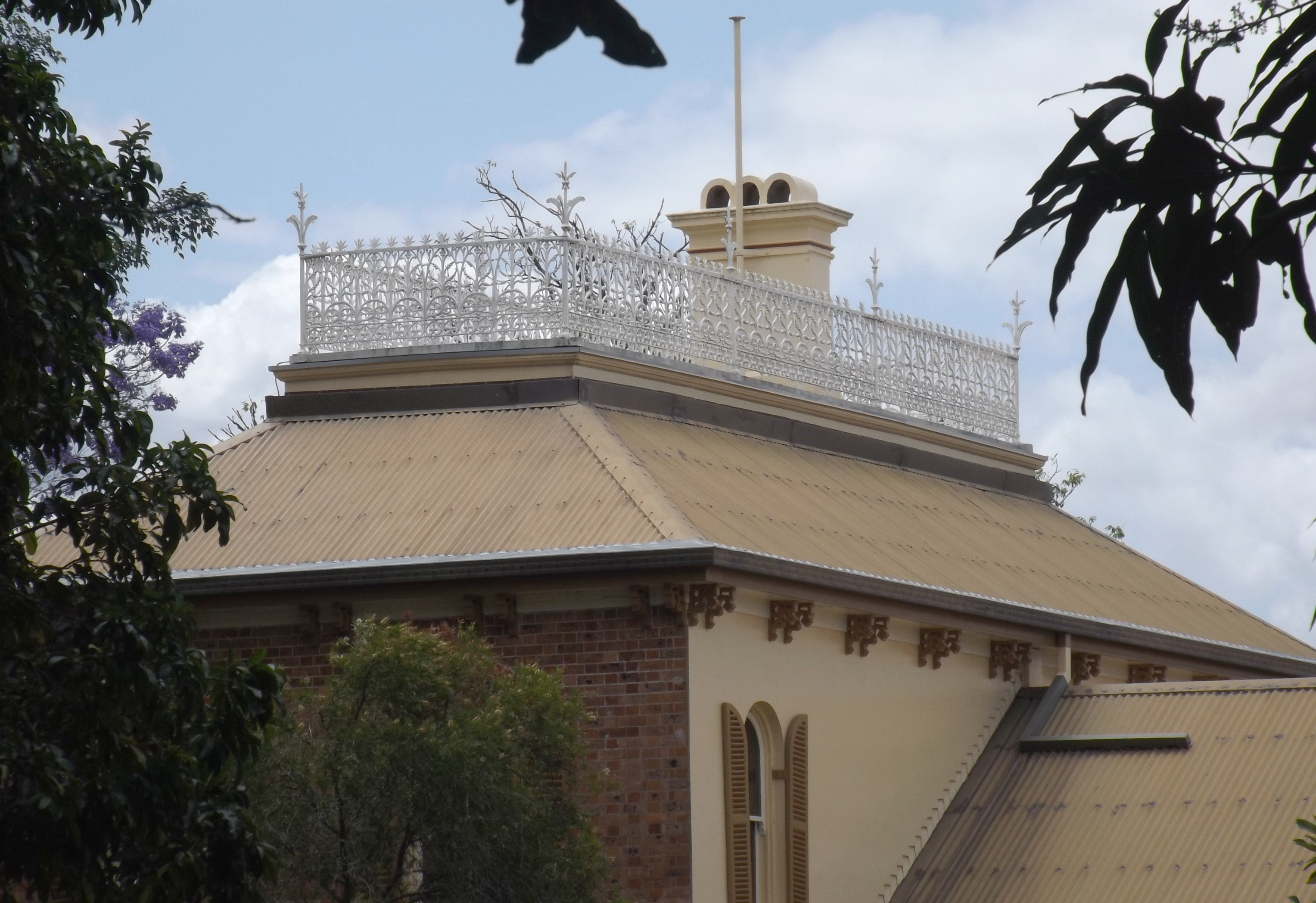
Rooftop, 2015

Rockton is a large Victorian-era mansion which shows evidence of its staged construction and alterations over a long period of time.

The earliest wing is a simple lowset single-storey facebrick structure with a hipped roof and generally open verandahs on two sides. The structure is one room in width and has windows and doors opening directly to the open verandahs which provide the only access. The roof is clad with Colorbond custom orb profile sheeting. This original wing has a timber floor. Parts of the verandah have been enclosed to provide a small bathroom and storeroom.

The original wing was extended with a more substantial single-storey structure distinguished by the break in the roof between the main hipped form and the separate skillion over the verandahs on two sides. The materials are loadbearing facebrick, timber floor and colorbond custom orb roof sheeting. Verandah posts on these first two wings consist of rectangular profile timber supports with simple column capitals.

The third wing or two-storeyed section is more elaborate both in scale and detail. It has open verandahs on the north-western side with lower verandahs now enclosed in casement windows and weatherboard cladding, The upper construction and detailing of this two-storey wing includes polychromatic brickwork, timber floors, shuttered windows and doors and a steeply hipped roof surmounted by a widows' walk with cast-iron lace balustrading.

The transition between the second wing and the two-storey wing is defined on the northern side by an elaborately detailed bay window which provides an outlook over the garden from the breezeway/ballroom - now the largest room in the house.

Internally, the house has a new kitchen, study and storage in the original wing. The main drawing room, dining and main entry are in the second wing. The two-storey wing contains bedrooms, bathrooms and a staircase. Alterations to the detailing of door and window joinery and plasterwork show the influence of the Arts and Crafts movement.

Outbuildings include an early timber-framed and -clad billiard room with a gable-ended roof; a contemporary steel portal-frame, brick-clad garage with gable roof and a brick-walled garden shed with a flat jettied rafter roof structure.

The extensive garden contains stands of massive hoop pines, figs, poincianas, jacarandas and palms set around a circular driveway, providing an impressive setting for the large house.

== Heritage listing ==
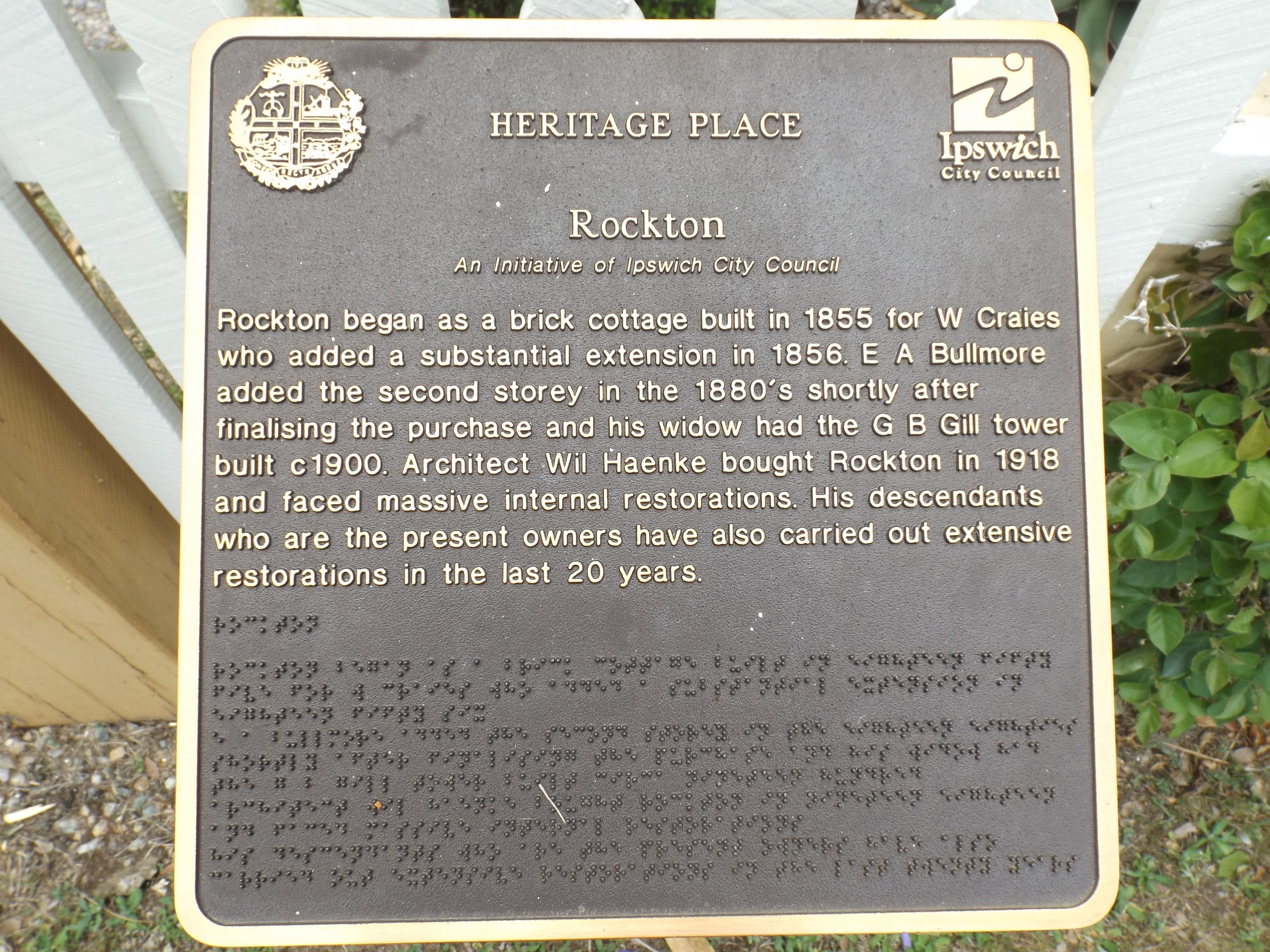
Ipswich City Council plaque, 2015

Rockton was listed on the Queensland Heritage Register on 21 October 1992 having satisfied the following criteria.

The place is important in demonstrating the evolution or pattern of Queensland's history.

Rockton is a rare example of a house whose construction commenced in the 1850s; the 1855 wing appears to be the oldest surviving building in Ipswich.

The place demonstrates rare, uncommon or endangered aspects of Queensland's cultural heritage.

Rockton is a rare example of a house whose construction commenced in the 1850s; the 1855 wing appears to be the oldest surviving building in Ipswich.

The place is important in demonstrating the principal characteristics of a particular class of cultural places.

Together with its outbuildings and garden, it demonstrates the characteristics of a large suburban mansion of the 19th century.

The place is important because of its aesthetic significance.

The place is important in exhibiting aesthetic characteristics valued by the community. It is impressive in its size, its detailing and its cohesive fusion of elements built over a period of more than a century. It retains an impressive setting within a large garden containing mature trees which in themselves have landmark qualities.

The place has a special association with the life or work of a particular person, group or organisation of importance in Queensland's history.

The place is associated with important families of early Queensland - the Craies, Towns, Hodgsons and Bullmores. It is closely associated with the Haenke family who made a significant contribution to Queensland through architecture, coalmining and literature.
