= Anabella Villalobos =

Medicinal chemist

- Education: University of Panama, B.S. in Chemistry; University of Kansas, PhD in Medicinal chemistry
- Scientific career
- Fields: Medicinal chemistry
- Workplaces: Yale University as NIH Postdoctoral Fellow; Pfizer Biogen

Anabella P. Villalobos is a medicinal chemist and senior pharmaceutical executive at Biogen.

== Background and career ==
Villalobos was raised in Panama City. She received her BS in chemistry from the University of Panama, received her Ph.D. (1987) at the University of Kansas with Professor Lester A. Mitscher, and was a National Institutes of Health postdoctoral fellow at Yale University, working with Samuel J. Danishefsky. She joined Pfizer in 1989, working on a variety of Central nervous system (CNS) projects in medicinal chemistry, diagnostics, and Positron emission tomography imaging radiotracers against Alzheimer's disease. In 2001, Villalobos became Head of CNS Medicinal Chemistry, and in 2007 Head of Antibacterial and CNS Chemistry. By 2016, she was VP of Neuroscience and Pain medicinal chemistry, and published a video outreach campaign to describe her work. In 2017, Villalobos was recruited to be the Senior Vice President for Biotherapeutics & Medicinal Sciences at Biogen.

== Awards and honors ==
- 2014: Connecticut Women's Hall of Fame honoree
- 2010: CURE award for neuroscience research
- 1987-1989: NIH postdoctoral fellow
- 1981-1983: Fulbright-Hays fellow
