= Cynthia K. Thompson =

American neuroscientist

- Occupations: Neurolinguist and cognitive neuroscientist

Academic background
- Education: B.S. Psychology; M.S. Speech and Language Pathology; M.S. Psychology; Ph.D. Speech and Language Pathology
- Alma mater: University of Oregon; University of Kansas
- Thesis: An experimental analysis of the effects of two treatments on Wh interrogative production in agrammatic aphasia (1983)

Cynthia K. Thompson is a neurolinguist and cognitive neuroscientist most known for her research on the brain and language processing and the neurobiology of language recovery in people with aphasia. She served as a member of the faculty at Northwestern University (NU) for 30 years as a Distinguished Ralph and Jean Sundin Professor in the Department of Communication Sciences and Disorders. She also directed the Aphasia and Neurolinguistics Research Laboratory (ANRL) and the Center for the Neurobiology of Language Recovery (CNLR) and is a Distinguished Ralph and Jean Sundin Professor Emerita at NU.

== Education ==
Thompson completed a B.S. in psychology from the University of Oregon in 1975, followed by an M.S. in Psychology and M.S. in Speech and Language Pathology in 1976 from the same institution. She received her Ph.D. in Speech and Language Pathology at the University of Kansas in 1983.

== Career ==
Early in her academic career, Thompson held Assistant and associate professor positions at The Pennsylvania State University and the University of Florida, respectively. She joined the NU faculty in the Roxelyn and Richard Pepper Department of Communication Sciences and Disorders in 1992 and was appointed Distinguished Ralph and Ralph and Jean Sundin Professor in 2009. Among her many contributions to the department she founded and directed the Aphasia Center at NU.

Thompson was Associate Editor for Language for the Journal of Speech, Language, and Hearing Research from 2000 to 2003, and Specialty Chief Editor for the Frontiers in Human Neuroscience: Speech and Language from 2019 to 2022. She has been an Action Editor for Cortex since 2014. She also served as Chair of the Research and Scientific Affairs Committee for the American Speech, Language, Hearing Association (ASHA) from 1998 to 2001 and Chair of the Clinical Aphasiology Program in 2001. For the Academy of Aphasia she served on the Board of Governors from 2003 to 2007 and again from 2011 to 2017, and as Treasurer from 2011 to 2017.

Thompson is a fellow of the Mesulam Cognitive Neurology and Alzheimer's Disease Center and the Buehler Center on Aging at NU and the Institute for the Advanced Study and Communication Process (University of Florida). She is a fellow of the American Speech-Language-Hearing Association (ASHA) and received honors of the Association, the highest award conferred by ASHA in 2013.

== Research ==
Thompson's research has focused on the neurobiology of language, particularly sentence processing in both neurotypical adults and those with aphasia resulting from stroke and neurodegenerative disease.

Thompson has used both linguistic and psycholinguistic accounts of normal language processing to predict breakdown and recovery patterns in patients and to develop treatment for people with sentence processing impairments associated with aphasia. Her research team has used functional magnetic resonance imaging (fMRI), electroencephalography (EEG), and on-line eye tracking to investigate normal and disordered neurocognitive processing mechanisms and to chart patterns of language recovery.

Thompson and her team found that healthy people engage a predominantly left hemisphere (LH) neural network for sentence processing. In large-scale aphasia treatment studies, they found that when the LH is damaged, right hemisphere (RH) regions are recruited to support treatment-induced recovery of sentence comprehension and production, attesting to RH neuroplasticity and adaptivity in rebuilding language processes. Her group also has identified critical brain tissue associated with sentence processing using voxel-based lesion-symptom mapping in people with aphasia.

Thompson coined the Argument Structure Complexity Hypothesis (ASCH) and the Complexity Account of Treatment Efficacy (CATE), developed Treatment of Underlying Forms (TUF) for sentence processing impairments in aphasia, and identified behavioral and neural variables associated with language recovery and neuroplasticity, including white matter tract integrity and neural activation during rest (resting-state fMRI). She also developed diagnostic tools for assessing language disorders in adults with aphasia, including the Northwestern Assessment of Verbs and Sentences (NAVS), the Northwestern Anagram Test (NAT), the Northwestern Naming Battery (NNB), the Northwestern Assessment of Verb Inflection (NAVI), and a method for analyzing narrative language: the Northwestern Narrative Language Analysis System (NNLA). She has authored over 200 journal articles and 40 book chapters.

== Awards and honors ==
- 1998 – Fellow, American Speech-Language-Hearing Association
- 2007 – Martin E. and Gertrude G. Walder Award for Research Excellence, Northwestern University
- 2007 – Editor's Award, American Journal of Speech and Language Pathology
- 2011 – Endowed Investiture Ralph and Jean Sundin Professorship, Northwestern University
- 2013 – Honors of the Association, American Speech-Language-Hearing Association
- 2014 – Distinguished Health Professions Alumna, Kansas University Medical Center
- 2017 – Karl Rosengren Faculty Mentoring Award, Northwestern University

== Bibliography ==
=== Selected books ===
- Treatment efficacy research in communication disorders (1990) ISBN 978-0910329620
- Aphasia Rehabilitation: The Impairment and Its Consequences (2008) ISBN 978-1597561624
- Perspectives on Agrammatism (2012) ISBN 978-0203120378

=== Selected articles ===
- Thompson, C. K., Ballard, K. J., Tait, M. E., Weintraub, S., & Mesulam, M. (1997). Patterns of language decline in non-fluent primary progressive aphasia. Aphasiology, 11(4-5), 297-321.
- Kim, M., & Thompson, C. K. (2000). Patterns of comprehension and production of nouns and verbs in agrammatism: Implications for lexical organization. Brain and language, 74(1), 1-25.
- Thompson, C. K., Bonakdarpour, B., Fix, S. C., Blumenfeld, H. K., Parrish, T. B., Gitelman, D. R., & Mesulam, M. M. (2007). Neural correlates of verb argument structure processing. Journal of Cognitive Neuroscience, 19(11), 1753-1767.
- Bonakdarpour, B., Parrish, T. B., & Thompson, C. K. (2007). Hemodynamic response function in patients with stroke-induced aphasia: implications for fMRI data analysis. Neuroimage, 36(2), 322-331.
- Mesulam, M. M., Wieneke, C., Thompson, C., Rogalski, E., & Weintraub, S. (2012). Quantitative classification of primary progressive aphasia at early and mild impairment stages. Brain, 135(5), 1537-1553.
- Meltzer-Asscher, A., Mack, J. E., Barbieri, E., & Thompson, C. K. (2015). How the brain processes different dimensions of argument structure complexity: Evidence from fMRI. Brain and language, 142, 65-75.
- Mack, J. E., & Thompson, C. K. (2017). Recovery of online sentence processing in aphasia: Eye movement changes resulting from treatment of underlying forms. Journal of Speech, Language, and Hearing Research, 60(5), 1299-1315.
- Walenski, M., Europa, E., Caplan, D., & Thompson, C. K. (2019). Neural networks for sentence comprehension and production: An ALE‐based meta‐analysis of neuroimaging studies. Human brain mapping, 40(8), 2275-2304.
