= Federico Varona =

American communication scholar

- Born: January 6, 1946 (age 80); Ciadoncha, Burgos, Spain
- Occupations: Communication scholar, academic and author

Academic background
- Education: Diplomatura degree in Psychology; Licenciatura degree in Theology; M.A. in Organizational Communication; Ph.D.in Organizational Communication
- Alma mater: Universidad de San Carlos de Guatemala; Universidad Francisco Marroquín; Pontifical University of Salamanca; University of Kansas
- Thesis: De Carl R. Rogers a la Pedagogía de la Fe <1976); A Comparative Study of Communication Satisfaction in two Guatemalan Companies (1988); Communication Satisfaction and Organizational Commitment: A Study in Three Guatemalan Organizations (1991) (Dissertation)

Federico Varona is an American Communication scholar, academic and author. He is an Emeritus Professor of Communication Studies at San José State University.

Varona has conducted work focused on appreciative intervention, organizational communication, business communication, communication satisfaction, organizational commitment, and communication climate. He is an author of El Círculo de la Comunicación, Multicultural management. La comunicación en la era de la globalización y su impacto en la empresa, La Intervención Apreciativa, La Intervención Apreciativa: Un nuevo paradigma para el cambio positivo en las organizaciones para profesores, estudiantes universitarios, consultores y gerentes, and Pedagogía y Educación de la Fe. Varona has been an invited speaker and presenter at conferences in different countries.

== Education ==
In 1964 he moved to Guatemala and got the High School Teaching Credential from the Normal School in Antigua Guatemala City (1967). After completing his studies in Psychology and Theology from Guatemala, at the San Carlos University and Universidad Francisco Marroquin, Varona moved to Spain in 1974 and received his Diplomatura degree in Psychology, and Licenciatura degree in Theology from Pontifical University of Salamanca in 1976. He then moved to France in 1977 and received his diploma certificate in Audiovisual Communication from Center AudioVisuel Recherche and Communication. For further studies, in 1986, he moved to the United States, as a Fulbright Scholar. He attended University of Kansas and received his Master’s degree in Organizational Communication in 1988, and his Doctoral degree in 1991.

== Career ==
Varona started his academic career in Nicaragua as a teacher in two La Salle High Schools in the cities of León and Managua, Nicaragua (1967–1972). He was Founder, First Chair and Professor of the Instituto Centro Americano de Ciencias Religiosas for 5 years (1977–1981) in Guatemala City. He was also First Chair and Professor of the Communication Sciences Department for 5 years (1981–1986) at the Universidad Rafael Landívar of Guatemala City.

After this appointment, he moved to the United States as a Fulbright Scholar and joined the University of Kansas in 1986 and in 1988 was a Graduate Teaching Assistant. In 1991, he held a brief appointment as an Instructor at Johnson County Community College before joining San Jose State University as an Assistant Professor of Communication Studies. He was promoted to Associate Professor in 1997, and to Professor in 2002 at San Jose State University.

== Research ==
Varona’s research expertise encompasses appreciative intervention, organizational communication, business communication, communication satisfaction, superior communication styles, challenges of communication in organizations, communication climate and organizational commitment.

=== Appreciative Intervention ===
In his work regarding appreciative intervention, Varona focused on Appreciative Theory, stages of the appreciative intervention process, and conditions of its success. He also studied challenges of Appreciative Theory, attributes of positive thinking, and affirmative competence. In his paper published in 2010, he explored the credibility, theoretical and empirical bases of appreciative intervention. He also discussed the ingredients necessary for the usage of appreciative intervention.

The 2nd Edition of the book La Intervención Apreciativa was published in 2020.

=== Organizational Communication ===
Varona’s research on organizational communication focused on organizational communication audits. He discussed the significant aspects of communication audits including the process of analysis, the method of interpretation, and conclusion development. He also proposed possible constraints of the work such as the perspective ethnocentric form conceived during the process. He investigated several challenges of internal communication in organizations, and focused on organizational culture, management, Internal communication channels, and approaches of internal communication.

Varona conducted a comparative analysis of the Superior Communication Style between Finnish and Mexican Employees. His study indicated the variation of communication styles in the context of different cultures, and the validity of “post hoc” cultural explanation of communication behaviors in theorizing the influence of culture on communication.

=== Communication Satisfaction and Organizational Commitment ===
In his research work, Varona examined the relationship between organizational communication satisfaction and organizational commitment in the context of Guatemalan organizations. Results of his study indicated a positive relationship between communication satisfaction and employees' organizational commitment, and a higher level of commitment among supervisors as compared to their subordinates in terms of communication practices. He also focused on the conceptualization of employees and supervisors regarding organizational commitment and communication satisfaction in Guatemalan organizations.

== Bibliography ==
=== Books ===
- Pedagogía y Educación de la Fe. (1979)
- El Círculo de la Comunicación (2005) ISBN 8497450892
- Multicultural management. La comunicación en la era de la globalización y su impacto en la empresa (2007) ISBN 9788497452236
- La Intervención Apreciativa: Una manera nueva, provocadora y efectiva para construir las nuevas organizaciones del siglo XXI. (2009) ISBN 9789588252896
- La Intervención Apreciativa: Un nuevo paradigma para el cambio positivo en las organizaciones para profesores, estudiantes universitarios, consultores y gerentes (2020) ISBN 9789587892161

=== Selected articles ===
- Varona, F. (1996). Relationship between communication satisfaction and organizational commitment in three Guatemalan organizations. The Journal of Business Communication, 33 (2), 111-140.
- Varona, F. (2002). Conceptualization and management of communication satisfaction and organizational commitment in three Guatemalan organizations. American Communication Journal, 5 (3), 114-136.
- Varona, F. (1993). Conceptualization and supervision of communication in organizational commitment. Communication Dialogues, (35), 8.
- Madrid, FV (1994). Organizational communication audits from an American academic perspective. Dialogues Magazine, 39 .
- Varona, F. (1991). Communication satisfaction and organizational commitment: A study in three Guatemalan organizations (Doctoral dissertation, University of Kansas).
