= Susan Scholz =

Associate professor and Harper Faculty Fellow at the University of Kansas

Susan Scholz is a professor, Harper Faculty Fellow and associate dean at the University of Kansas School of Business. Her academic interests lie in Accounting and Information Systems, more specifically Financial Accounting, Restatement of Financial Statements, and the Market for Auditing and Consulting Services.

== Education ==
She received her B.A. in Accounting from The University of Utah and her Ph.D (Business) from University of Southern California.

== Honors ==
She received the Deloitte Wildman Award by AAA in 2006. She served on the Accounting Horizons editorial board.
