= David Wittig =

American business executive

David Wittig (born July 29, 1955) is the former chief executive officer of Topeka, Kansas-based Westar Energy, a utility company.

Born in Kansas City, Missouri, Wittig became a Wall Street investment banker. In 1995, Wittig, having earned millions in New York, was asked to return to Kansas as an executive at Western Resources (later renamed Westar Energy) by John E. Hayes, then CEO of Western and a customer of Wittig's at Salomon Brothers. At that time, Warren Buffett had taken over Salomon in the wake of a trading scandal "and decided to cut the exorbitant compensation of the firm’s managing directors." Wittig accepted the Western invitation, and was named President in 1998 and Chairman and CEO in January 1999. He quickly became one of Topeka's most prominent citizens and was a generous contributor to local charities. Wittig supported the Multi-cultural Business Scholars Program at the University of Kansas and established a $250,000 scholarship in his family's name. He then purchased and renovated the mansion of former Kansas governor Alf Landon, the 1936 presidential nominee of the Republican Party. Wittig's remodeling of the home (appraised at roughly $2 million, compared to the median Topeka single-family home value of $125,000) later became subject to much controversy.

Among other unconventional initiatives taken by Wittig at Westar, he "bought around 30 percent of ADT, the home-security company, and then sold it for a pre-tax profit of $865 million to Tyco, making more for the staid utility in one year than it had made in many."

In 2002, it was revealed that there was some evidence that a Topeka banker had entered into an illegal loan with Wittig. The banker, Clinton (Del) Weidner, well known in Topeka for his charitable efforts, had informed Wittig that he was considering investing in a property development in Arizona and needed a $1.5 million loan to make a proper investment in the venture. Wittig loaned Weidner $1.5 million and Weidner increased the bank's line of credit to Wittig, ultimately by $2 million. The two men faced trial in 2003, and both were found guilty as charged. In February 2004, Weidner was sentenced to six years and six months in a federal prison in North Dakota. Wittig that same month was sentenced to four years in prison and fined $1 million.

Concurrent with the loan to Weidner becoming public, Wittig and corporate strategy vice president Douglas Lake resigned from Westar amid charges of "looting" the utility company. Prosecutors contended that the two men had unjustly compensated themselves and used the company jet for non-business-related matters. The two men were put to trial on 39 charges in the fall of 2004. The tide seemed to be in favor of the prosecution, but the trial ended with a hung jury in December. A retrial with an added 40th charge was conducted during the late summer of 2005. On September 12, Wittig was convicted of 39 counts while Lake was convicted of 30; both were convicted of the 40th charge, forfeiture, later that week. On April 4, 2006, US District Judge Julie Robinson sentenced Wittig to 18 years and ordered him to pay a $5 million fine in addition to $14.5 million in restitution. Wittig faced a maximum of 455 years behind bars and intended to appeal.

On January 5, 2007, the 10th U.S. Circuit Court of Appeals overturned the convictions of Wittig and Lake in the Westar Energy case. Wittig was freed from prison on February 12, 2007.

Wittig was scheduled to be retried for the third time for looting Westar in September 2008. With delays, in July 2010, the new trial was set to begin September 20. However, the trial judge first was "expected to rule whether to proceed at all (and, if so, on what basis), in light of the Supreme Court’s ruling [in June] on the conviction of the former Enron executive Jeffrey Skilling, which appears to limit the government’s use of the so-called honest services statute to seek convictions in corruption cases. A motion to dismiss the case is before" the judge, Julie A. Robinson.

In 2010 all charges against Wittig were dismissed.

In July 2011, Wittig settled a dispute with Westar Energy for back compensation owed him. The settlement amount received by Wittig was $36,000,000 in cash, $3,100,000 in legal fees incurred by Wittig, and $2,700,000 in stock compensation.
