= Graham Snelding =

American football coach (born 1972)

Current position
- Title: Head coach
- Team: Nowata HS (OK)

Biographical details
- Born: December 11, 1972; Borger, Texas, U.S.
- Education: Haskell Indian Nations University, Northwestern Oklahoma State University, University of Kansas

Coaching career (HC unless noted)
- 2001: Haskell Indian Nations
- 2005: Pawhuska HS (OK)
- 2007: Marietta HS (OK)
- 2008–2011: Ponca City OK) (OC)
- 2012: Teague HS (TX) (DC)
- 2014–2015: Blackwell HS (OK)
- 2017: Ponca City OK) (OC)
- 2018–present: Newkirk HS (OK)

Head coaching record
- Overall: 0–11 (college)

Radford "Graham" Snelding VII (born December 11, 1972) is an American football coach. Snelding was the head football coach at Haskell Indian Nations University in Lawrence, Kansas, serving for one season, in 2001, and compiling a record of 0–11. Snelding is the current head football coach at Nowata High School in Nowata, Oklahoma. He was the head football coach of Fredrick High School in Frederick, Oklahoma. He was he the defensive coordinator for Teague High School in Teague, Texas in 2012 and the offensive coordinator for Ponca City High School in Ponca City, Oklahoma for the 2008 through the 2011 seasons and in 2017. He has also coached high school football at Pawhuska, Oklahoma, Marietta, Oklahoma, Clarksville, Texas and Perry, Florida.
