= Deborah Heikes =

American philosopher academic and author

Deborah K. Heikes
- Occupations: Philosopher, academic and author

Academic background
- Education: BA., Philosophy; MA., Philosophy; PhD., Philosophy
- Alma mater: University of Kansas; Baylor University; University of Illinois Urbana-Champaign

Deborah K. Heikes is a philosopher, academic and author. She is a professor of Philosophy at the University of Alabama in Huntsville.

Heikes is known for her research in feminism, the philosophy of race, modern philosophy, and 20th-century analytic thought, with a focus on Immanuel Kant, Ludwig Wittgenstein, feminist epistemology, and philosophy of mind. She is the author of the books Towards a Liberatory Epistemology, Rationality, Representation, and Race, The Virtue of Feminist Rationality, Rationality and Feminist Philosophy, and Epistemic Responsibility for Undesirable Beliefs.

Heikes was on the program committee for the Central Division of the American Philosophical Association in 2018, and has been the Treasurer for Southwestern Philosophical Society since 2010.

== Education and early career ==
Heikes earned a bachelor's degree in philosophy from the University of Kansas in 1991. She then pursued a master's degree in philosophy at Baylor University, which she completed in 1992 and received the Clifford P. Osborne fellowship at the University of Kansas in 1993. During this time, she began her academic career as a lecturer at Illinois State University in 1995 and received a University of Illinois at Urbana-Champaign Fellowship from 1995 to 1996. She then went on to receive a Ph.D. in philosophy from the University of Illinois in 1998.

== Career ==
Heikes continued her career as an assistant professor of philosophy at the University of Alabama in Huntsville in 1998. In 2005, she was appointed Associate Professor and has been working as a Professor since 2012.

Heikes served as the Chair of Philosophy at the University of Alabama in Huntsville from 2014 to 2017, and serves on numerous faculty committees, including the Student, Staff, and Faculty Emergency (SSAFE) Fund and Women's Studies Advisory Committee.

== Research ==
Heikes' research interests include 20th century philosophy, philosophy of gender, race, and sexuality, and 17th/18th century philosophy. She has developed rationality as a virtue concept. Specifically, her interest lies in constructing an account of rationality that incorporates subjective and social elements while preserving an objective foundation for concepts such as reason, equality, and justice. Her research in the areas of rationalism and feminist philosophy has also focused on exploring feminist critiques of rationality and the impact of post-Cartesian rationality on ideas surrounding race.

== Works ==
Heikes has authored three books on the topic of rationality. In her book Rationality and Feminist Philosophy, she challenged Enlightenment rationality's relevance, advocated a virtue-based alternative aligned with feminism, and explored its historical impact on oppression. Alessandra Tanesini in her review for Notre Dame Philosophical Reviews remarked, "...there is no doubt that Heikes has produced a salutary antidote to the allure of relativism among some feminists, and as such this book is to be welcomed." Later on, she published The Virtue of Feminist Rationality in 2012 and introduced a feminist theory of rationality, rejecting the notion of reason as inherently masculine. This work outlined a virtue-based rationality aligned with feminist dichotomies and demonstrated its support for feminist moral, political, and epistemic objectives. In addition, she examined the source of exclusion of non-whites and non-males from rationality in modern subjectivism, contrasting it with alternative views and advocating for a diverse, virtue-based understanding of rationality in her 2016 book, Rationality, Representation, and Race.

Heikes also explored the moral and epistemic duties to understand the experiences of others, in her book titled, Towards a Liberatory Epistemology. This work particularly addressed the impact of ignorance on oppression, advocating for reasonableness as a solution in the realms of feminist theory and critical race theory.

=== Rationality as a virtue concept ===
Heikes has focused her research on developing a notion of rationality that departs from conventional contemporary perspectives on the human mind. She proposed a virtue-based approach grounded in contemporary rationality, addressing feminist concerns against anti-modern views and responding to Benhabib's query in 'Situating of the Self'. In related research, she examined the concept of reason, its history, constraints, and contemporary alternatives, suggested that treating rationality as a virtue concept offers a far more expansive view, advocating for a virtue-based perspective to overcome limitations in modern thinking.

=== Feminist epistemology ===
In her research, Heikes has explored how feminism challenges established notions of rationality predominantly shaped by male thought processes and analyzed how understanding feminism requires questioning inherently masculine notions of rationality. Historically, feminist perspectives have built upon traditional theories of rationality, but she has pointed them toward a different direction. She has emphasized that feminists can address their concerns in a better way if they engage in discourse involving modern notions of rationality, instead of the traditional ones.

Heikes has looked into the issue of morality and bias in epistemological studies and highlighted the existing paradox of information where it was not possible to determine the objective truth. She determined that the bias paradox could be found in different perspectives, including feminism, and stemmed from the uncertainty between objectivity and relativism in epistemology. In her work, she proposed a solution that recognized the necessity of incorporating both objective and subjective elements in reasoning, rather than relying solely on absolutes from either perspective.

=== Post-Cartesian rationality and the concept of race ===
In a paper published in The Journal of Mind and Behavior, Heikes explored the Enlightenment's contradictory stance on equality, the development of gender and race stereotypes, and the role of reason in excluding epistemically different individuals, linking the rise of racism to the pursuit of universal knowledge and moral equality.

Heikes assessed post-Cartesian critiques of modernism and pre-modern attempts to tackle the diversity of human cognition, contending that these approaches offer a multifaceted and morally significant form of rationality. Her proposal of "reasonableness" as a solution offered a new angle for tackling the matter of race and thinking. According to her, the dilemma of needing uniformity in reason or accepting all ways of thinking can be resolved by working with reasonableness. Rachel A. Johnson, commented, "Throughout the paper, Heikes gives many plausible descriptions of good reasoning and of the good reasoner, so I think that the framework she proposes for how we should think about reason is likely correct."

== Bibliography ==
=== Books ===
- Rationality and Feminist Philosophy (2010) ISBN 9781441161918
- The Virtue of Feminist Rationality (2012) ISBN 9781472533456
- Rationality, Representation, and Race (2016) ISBN 9781137591708
- Towards a Liberatory Epistemology (2019) ISBN 9783030164843
- Epistemic Responsibility for Undesirable Beliefs (2023) ISBN 9783031418570

=== Selected articles ===
- Heikes, D. K. (2004). Wittgenstein and the private language of ethics. Southwest Philosophy Review, 20(2), pages 27–38.
- Heikes, D. K. (2004). The bias paradox: why it's not just for feminists anymore. Synthese, 138, pages 315–335.
- Heikes, D. K. (2009). Let's be Reasonable: Feminism and Rationality. Southwest Philosophy Review, 25(1), pages 127–134.
- Heikes, D. K. (2015). Race and the Copernican turn. The Journal of Mind and Behavior, pages 139–163.
- Heikes, D. K. (2017). On Being Reasonably Different. Southwest Philosophy Review, 33(1), pages 53–61.
- Heikes, D. K. (2020). Epistemic Ignorance and Moral Responsibility. Southwest Philosophy Review, 36(1), pages 93–100.
- Heikes, D. K. (2023). Epistemic Involuntarism and Undesirable Beliefs. Southwest Philosophy Review, 39(1), pages 225–233.
