= Phil Homeratha =

American football coach

Biographical details
- Born: March 22, 1943; Red Rock, Oklahoma, U.S.
- Died: December 29, 2011 (aged 68); Lawrence, Kansas, U.S.

Playing career

Football
- 1964–1967: Tarkio

Basketball
- 1964–1968: Tarkio
- Position: Halfback (football)

Coaching career (HC unless noted)

Football
- 2010: Haskell Indian Nations

Women's basketball
- 1995–2011: Haskell Indian Nations

Administrative career (AD unless noted)
- 2006–2011: Haskell Indian Nations

Head coaching record
- Overall: 1–9 (football)

Phil Homeratha (March 22, 1943 – December 29, 2011) was an American sports coach, educator, and college athletics administrator. He coached football, basketball, cross country, track and field, and wrestling at Haskell Indian Nations University in Lawrence, Kansas. Homeratha was the head football coach for the 2010 season at Haskell, leading the Fighting Indians to a record of 1–9. He was also the head women's basketball coach at Haskell from 1995 to 2011 and the school's athletic director for five years before his retirement from coaching in February 2011.

Homeratha was born on March 22, 1943, in Red Rock, Oklahoma to Curtis and Luella (née Black) Homeratha. He was a member of the Otoe–Missouria Tribe of Indians. He graduated from Haskell Institute in 1961 and later earned a Bachelor of Education from Tarkio College in Tarkio, Missouri and a Master of Education from Northwest Missouri State University in Maryville, Missouri.

Homeratha was diagnosed with Stage IV colon cancer in February 2011. He died on December 29, 2011, in Lawrence.

== Head coaching record ==
=== Football ===
Year	Team	Overall	Conference	Standing	Bowl/playoffs
Haskell Indian Nations Fighting Indians (NAIA independent) (2010)
2010	Haskell Indian Nations	1–9			
Haskell Indian Nations:		1–9			
Total:		1–9			
