= Charles Edward Sims =

State Librarian of Kansas from 1973 to 1975

Charles Edward Sims

Charles Edward Sims (4 May 1925 – 8 August 1983) was the State Librarian of Kansas from 1973 to 1975.

Sims was born in Rantoul, Kansas, a small town in east central Kansas. He was inducted into the US Army Air Corps in 1943 as a weapons mechanic, re-arming aircraft. After the war, Sims attended the University of Kansas in Lawrence, earning a degree in Library Management. He worked as a high school librarian and later as a consultant for the Kansas Employment Security Division.

He was appointed the State Librarian of Kansas by Governor Robert Docking in 1973. He held the position until the end of Docking's term in 1975 when he was fired by the incoming governor. Sims died of a heart attack in Topeka, Kansas, on 8 August 1983.
