= Kenneth Megill =

American philosopher (b. 1939)

Kenneth Alden Megill
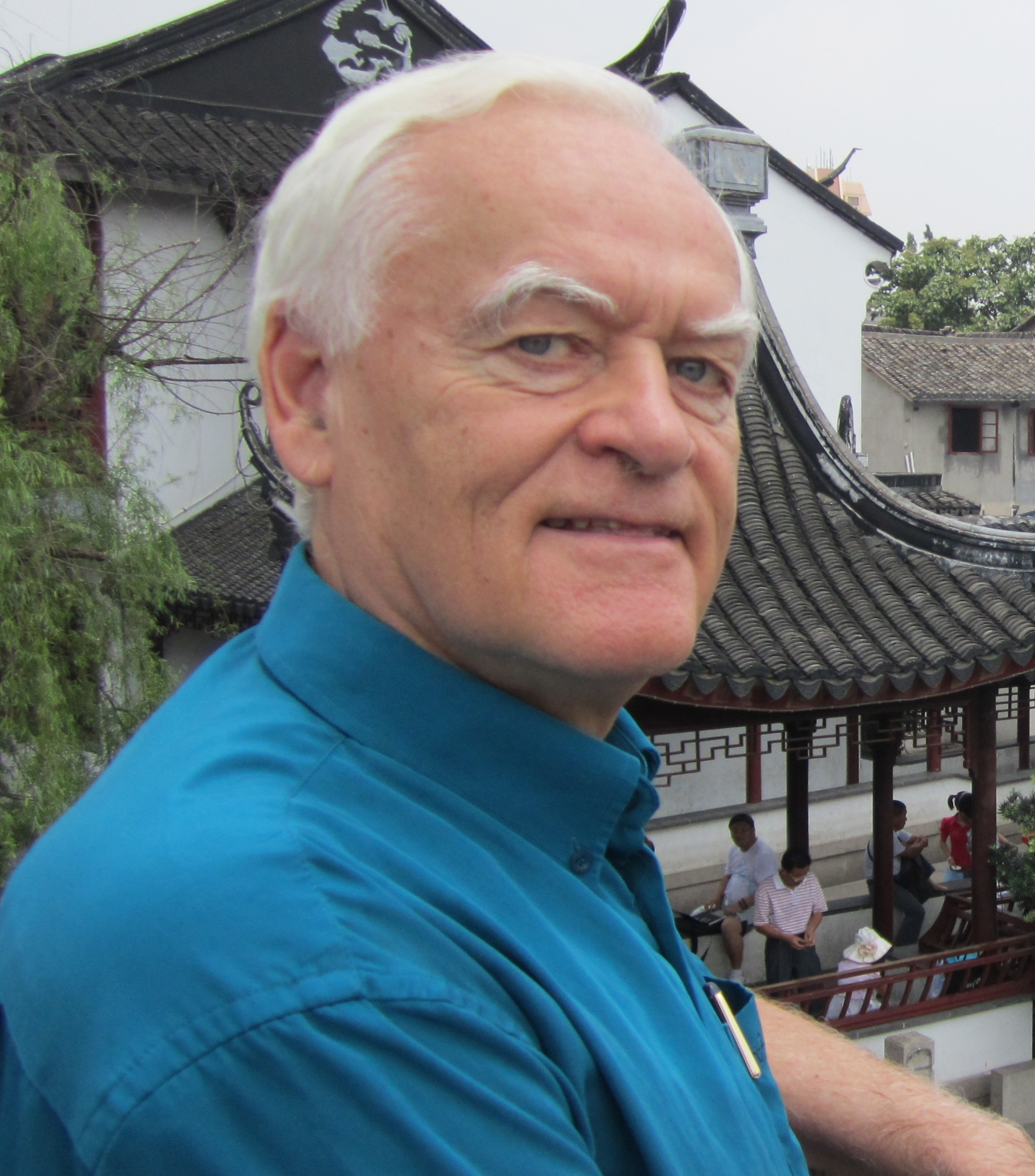
- Ken Megill in China 2011
- Born: 1939 (age 86–87); Esbon, Kansas, U.S.
- Education: University of Kansas (BA, 1960) University of Mainz (1961–62); Yale University (MA, 1964; PhD 1966); Free University and Humboldt University, Berlin (1964–65) The Catholic University of America MSLS 1987
- Occupations: Philosopher, trade unionist, political activist, and records and knowledge manager (pesident of Knowledge Application Services LLC)

Kenneth Megill is an American philosopher, trade unionist, political activist, and records and knowledge manager.

== Philosopher ==
Megill's primary philosophical contribution is the development of a democratic theory in the tradition of Democratic Marxism. Megill defined democracy as a political and social order where people control where they live and work.

In 1961-1962 he studied with Karl-Otto Apel who introduced him to the works of Karl Marx, Charles Sanders Peirce, Martin Heidegger, and Hans-Georg Gadamer. In 1964-1965 he studied at the Free University of Berlin where he worked with manuscripts by Marx that had only recently been made available. The Free University was one of the main scenes of the German student movement of 1968. The events of the 1968 movement provided the impulse for more openness, equality, and democracy in German society. Megill participated in several seminars that were attended by students who went on to be active in the student movement in Germany and France in 1968. In addition to attending seminars in West Berlin, he commuted through the Berlin Wall and was enrolled at the Humboldt University of Berlin in an advanced graduate seminar in Dialectical Materialism taught by the head of the philosophy department in the German Democratic Republic. Megill received his master's (1964) and doctoral (1966) degrees with a dissertation on "The Community as a Democratic Principle in Marx's Philosophy" at Yale University. Richard Bernstein was his adviser.

During 1968 he was a researcher at the Institute of Philosophy at the Hungarian Academy of Sciences organized by George Markus, an associate of the Hungarian philosopher and political leader Georg Lukacs. Megill met regularly with Lukacs and the members of what became known as the Budapest School. He visited philosophers and political activists in Poland and Czechoslovakia and attended the Korcula Summer School sponsored by the Praxis Group in Yugoslavia. which was the major gathering for European Democratic Marxists from both East and West Europe. The theme of the conference, especially appropriate in 1968, was "Marx and Revolution". During the conference, the Soviet Union invaded Czechoslovakia and brought an end to the Prague Spring and began a period of repression that led to the Budapest School losing their positions.

Megill published more than a dozen articles in philosophical academic journals. In 1970 Free Press/Macmillan published his book "The New Democratic Theory" in which he argued that liberal democracy and dialectical materialism had both failed and that a new theory of democracy was needed that focused on control of the places by those who lived and worked there.

When information managers began to use the term knowledge management. Megill went back to his philosophical roots where epistemology, the theory of knowledge, is a major field. He used his philosophical work, combined with his fifteen years as a practicing information manager, to write the major book, "Thinking for a Living", in knowledge management theory.

Forty years after the publication of "The Community as a Democratic Principle in Marx's Philosophy," which summarized the research he did for his doctoral dissertation, the Central Compilation and Translation Bureau (CCTB) of the Central Committee of the Chinese Communist Party published a translation of the article in a leading philosophical journal. He was subsequently invited by the CCTB to visit the Bureau for discussions and to present lectures at universities in Beijing on Lukacs and the Budapest School.

== University of Florida professor ==
In 1966, after receiving his PhD at the age of 26 from Yale University, Megill was hired as an assistant professor of philosophy, whose specialty was Marxism, by the University of Florida. and quickly became involved in the civil rights and anti-war movements.

During his years as a faculty member, Megill was controversial, outspoken, and was covered widely in the press. Megill was awarded an "outstanding professor" award from the College of Arts and Sciences, but also said, at the same time, that "at the proper time faculty members and radical students should combine to take over the university".

Police violence and political meddling are still facts of life for the public universities of Florida ... Until those who work at the university, the students and faculty, assume control of the institution where they live and work, and until the threat of police violence is removed, the public universities of Florida will be neither free nor democratic. If students and faculty are to take over the university it will mean a radical change.

Megill also called for the formation of "a strong teachers' union". (At the time, collective bargaining by public employees in Florida was prohibited by law.) Florida Representative Tom Slade, backed by other legislators, released to the news media a letter calling for Megill to be fired; there were student demonstrations supporting Megill. After an investigation. President Stephen C. O'Connell, a former Florida Supreme Court justice who had been appointed president of the university to "clean out" the radicals, said there was no justification and refused to do so.

In 1972, O'Connell overruled the recommendations of the Philosophy Department, the College of Arts and Sciences, and his own hearing examiner that Megill be awarded tenure, which meant Megill would be terminated when his contract expired in 1973 (as in fact happened). Widespread demonstrations followed. The state Board of Regents overruled the recommendation of the examiner it had named, who took 1,800 pages of testimony, and voted unanimously to support O'Connell's recommendation not to award tenure. Megill and the Gainesville local 1880 of the American Federal of Teachers sued, each asking for $500,000 in compensatory and punitive damages.

An extended legal battle ended with the Fifth Circuit Court ruling that a faculty without a contract, like Megill, could be terminated for no reason, for false reasons, or for any reason at all. That ruling became an important precedent that was cited 42 times in other cases.

== Political activist and trade unionist ==
After leaving the university, Megill became a full-time organizer for a faculty union. In 1976, the United Faculty of Florida (UFF) was elected as the bargaining agent for 6,000 faculty and professional employees in the nine (now ten) state universities. By 2014 the United Faculty of Florida (UFF) represented more than thirty thousand faculty and professional employees in Florida.

In 1982, Megill left the union presidency and moved to Washington where he worked for a number of different organizations.

- At the National Education Association (NEA), he developed a communications program for its higher education members. As a result of his recommendation, the National Education Association established a peer reviewed academic journal called "Thought and Action".
- He served as the Executive Director of the Virginia Association of Towing and Recovery Operators. He developed the first educational program for the tow truck driver. He represented its members in the Virginia legislature, where he succeeded in getting legislation passed that recognized the professionalism of the tow truck operators. He was selected as the Outstanding Executive in the country by Tow Times Magazine.
- He was the first development director for the Human Rights Campaign Fund. It became the largest lesbian and gay advocacy organization in the United States and is now called the Human Rights Campaign.

== Records and knowledge manager ==
Starting in the late 1980s Megill became a practicing records manager and later turned his attention to developing a theoretical framework for records and knowledge management. In 1987 he was hired as the first professional records manager at the Office of the Comptroller of the Currency (OCC), the Administrator of National Banks for the US federal government. He automated the operations of the Central File Room and spent a year working with other OCC staff to develop a data dictionary for banking.

He began a fifteen-year working relationship with Cuadra Associates and assisted them in developing the first software for managing electronic records. From 1988 to 1993, Megill taught courses at The Catholic University of America School of Library and Information Science. He was one of the first professors to use electronic technologies in teaching. He developed a certificate program in federal information resources management and, with a group of federal information professionals, he published a handbook on how to bring the information revolution to the federal government.

He published two editions of a book on corporate memory that gave a theoretical and practical bases for records management which was translated into Serbo-Croatian. Together with Herb Schantz, an engineer who held patents on many of the technologies used for document scanning, he wrote a book for document managers. Schantz was a leader in The Association for Work Process Improvement (TAWPI) which brought together technical and business leaders in optical character recognition.

As a consultant, Megill helped organizations and businesses to develop records management and archival programs. He spoke at professional meetings and continued his writing.

In 1999, Megill began a three-year project to create an Integrated Digital Environment (IDE) for the US Air Force.

The Air Force established a Work Culture Transformation Board made up of senior executives to transform the work culture of the Air Force from an information hoarding to an information sharing environment.

In 2005, Megill and Lawrence Tan founded a company, Knowledge Applications Services (KAS), to put his theoretical work into practice. He worked with the National Mediation Board (NMB), an agency managing labor-management relationships in the airline and railway industry. Under his leadership, NMB created the first all-electronic record management system in a federal agency.

== Publications: books ==
- Thinking for a Living. The Coming Age of Knowledge Work. Second Edition. Berlin: K.G. Saur/deGruyter (2013)
- Korporativna Memorija. Upravljanje dokumentima i informacijama u doba znaja. Kenet A. Megil. Beograd: Narodna biblioteka Srbije (2007)
- Corporate Memory: Records and Information Management in the Knowledge Age. 2nd Edition. Munich: K.G. Saur/Thomson (2005)
- Thinking for a Living: The Coming Age of Knowledge Work. Munich: K.G. Saur/Thomson (2004)
- Document Management: New Technologies for the Information Services Manager. London, Bowker Saur (Reed Elsevier) (With Herbert F. Schantz) (1998)
- The Corporate Memory: Information Management in the Electronic Age. London, Bowker Saur 1st Edition (Reed-Elsivar)(1997)
- Making the Information Revolution. A Handbook on Federal Information Resources Management. Silver Spring, Maryland. Association for Information and Image Management (AIIM) 1995. (With Rose Cummins, Thomas Horan, Sarah Kadec, Marilyn McLennan, Michael McReynolds, Robert Woods)
- The New Democratic Theory. New York, Free Press (Macmillan) (1970)

== Publications: articles ==
- "The Appeal of Marxism in the United States," in Festschrift for Dirk Struik, Robert Cohen, editor. 1974.
- "Philosophy for the People" Social Praxis, I(1) 1973 (pp. 69–79).
- "Lukacs' History and Class Consciousness," Social Praxis, (I)1 1973 (pp. 93–98).
- "Philosophers and Trade Unions," Radical Philosophers NewsJournal, 1972.
- "Georg Lukacs - Ortodonski Marksist," Praxis, 1971, (pp. 215–226) (in Serbo-Croatian).
- "On Marx's Method," Southern Journal of Philosophy, (9), 1971 (pp. 61–66).
- "The Community in Marx's Philosophy," Philosophy and Phenomenological Research, (30), 1970, (pp. 382–393).
- "In Defense of Revolution," Telos, (5), 1970 (pp. 190–196).
- "Pragmatizmus es Marxizmus," Vilagosag, (15), 1970 (pp. 238–243) (in Hungarian).
- "Georg Lukacs as an Ontologist," Studies in Soviet Thought, (9), 1969 (pp. 334–353).
- "Georg Lukacs Kao Ontolog," Praxis, (3/4), 1969 (pp. 424–440). (in Serbo-Croatian).
- "Philosophy in Hungary," International Philosophical Quarterly, (9) 1969 (pp. 261–277).
- "Democracy as Community in Marx's Philosophy," Akten des XIV Internationalen Kongresses fur Philosophie, Vienna, (11) 1968 (pp. 74–80).
- "Social Theory and Social Practice," Monist, (52) 1968 (pp. 452–464).
- "Peirce and Marx," Transactions of the C. S. Peirce Society, (3)2, 1967 (pp. 55–65).
- Midwestern States Speech Journal, two articles co-authored with Kim Griffin reporting empirical research on patterns in formal debates, 1960.

== Papers in archives ==
The University of Florida Department of Special & Area Studies Collections has a collection of Megill's papers from 1967–1973, as well as material relating to O'Connell's decision to deny Megill tenure.
