= David McClain (president) =

American economist and college president

David McClain is president emeritus of the University of Hawai‘i and a professor at the Shidler College of Business at the University of Hawai‘i's Mānoa campus.

McClain led the 10-campus University of Hawai‘i System from 2004 to 2009 and served as vice president of academic affairs from 2003 to 2004. He also served as a dean of the UH Manoa College of Business from 2000 to 2003. He has been a tenured member of the UH Mānoa faculty since 1991.

McClain was born in St. Joseph, Missouri (1946) and is the son of American parents.

McClain received a BA in economics and mathematics from the University of Kansas. He joined the U.S. Army, serving as a first lieutenant during the Vietnam War. He earned a PhD in economics from the Massachusetts Institute of Technology. He was a tenured faculty member and finance department chair at Boston University and the first director of its Management Development Program-Japan. He has taught at the MIT Sloan School of Management and at Universidad Gabriela Mistral in Santiago, Chile and has been a visiting scholar at Keio and Meiji Universities in Japan. He was a senior staff economist on the Council of Economic Advisors during the presidency of President Jimmy Carter, prior to which he directed international economic information services for Data Resources, Inc., a Lexington, MA based economic consulting firm.

He is the author of Apocalypse on Wall Street, a number of scholarly articles and hundreds of columns on economic issues. In 2007, McClain received an honorary Doctor of Humane Letters degree from Doshisha University in Kyoto, Japan.

He is married to Wendie McClain. Together, they have three children and two granddaughters. McClain's daughter Jenna taught elementary French at the University of Hawaii at Manoa, in 2006–2007.
