= Gretchen Kalonji =

American scientist and academic administrator

- Born: April 13, 1953 (age 73); Chicago, Illinois, U.S.
- Education: Massachusetts Institute of Technology (B.S., Ph.D.)
- Children: 3
- Awards: George Westinghouse Award (ASEE) (1994)
- Scientific career
- Fields: Materials science
- Workplaces: Massachusetts Institute of Technology; University of Washington; University of California, Santa Cruz; UNESCO; Sichuan University; Hong Kong Polytechnic University
- Thesis: Symmetry Principles in the Physics of Crystalline Interfaces (1982)
- Doctoral advisor: Samuel M. Allen
- Partner: Denice Denton

Gretchen Lynn Kalonji (born April 13, 1953) is an American materials scientist and academic administrator. She is dean of Sichuan University-Hong Kong Polytechnic University Institute for Disaster Management and Reconstruction. Kalonji was previously the assistant director-general for natural sciences at UNESCO. She was the Kyocera Professor of Materials Science at University of Washington and an associate professor at Massachusetts Institute of Technology.

== Early life and education ==
Kalonji was born April 13, 1953, in Chicago, Illinois to journalist parents and, after the age of seven, grew up moving between India, Hong Kong, Thailand, and East Africa. She was kicked out of school twice in Hong Kong during the 1967 leftist riots in which she participated in the siege of the U.S. embassy and protests against the Vietnam War. She was also kicked out of school in east Africa and eventually began working in metallurgy and learned practical skills in welding, milling, turning, elementary design, and drafting. Kalonji planned on applying for Kenyan citizenship after completing schooling in the United States. She enrolled at University of Maryland, College Park as a special student because she had not completed a high school diploma. She took courses in chemistry and materials science. After meeting Julia McCormick, the admissions director at MIT, Kalonji began undergraduate coursework at Massachusetts Institute of Technology in February 1979. Kalonji earned a B.Sc. in May 1980 and a Ph.D. in 1982 in materials science and engineering. She completed her dissertation in five semesters after her B.S. under the direction of Samuel M. Allen in 1982. She completed a cooperative internship at National Institute of Standards and Technology (then National Bureau of Standards) under mentor John W. Cahn. Kalonji's future research was influenced by courses she took with Robert W. Balluffi and Bernie Wuensch.

== Career ==
Kalonji was an assistant and associate professor in the MIT department of materials science and engineering from 1982 to 1990. At MIT, Kalonji was the U.S. co-director of the Computer Science and Electronics Program at Solomon Mahlangu Freedom College. While at MIT, Kalonji was active in the Anti-Apartheid Movement. Kalonji and Willard Johnson, a professor of political science and one of the founders of TransAfrica, organized a faculty disinvestment from South Africa campaign, led demonstrations, and facilitated staff meetings. In 1990, she became the Kyocera Professor of Materials Science at University of Washington. Kalonji joined the University of California as the director of international strategy development from 2005 to 2009 and the director of system-wide research development from 2009 to 2010. In 2006, she became a professor in the department of electrical engineering at University of California, Santa Cruz. On July 1, 2010, Kalonji became the assistant director-general for natural sciences at UNESCO. She is the first woman to hold this position at UNESCO. Kalonji is the dean of Sichuan University-Hong Kong Polytechnic University Institute for Disaster Management and Reconstruction and a strategic advisory of institutional development at SCU.

== Personal life ==
Kalonji sued MIT in 1994, alleging that she was denied tenure because of sexual discrimination. Several years later, the lawsuit was settled with undisclosed payments and the establishment of a project to encourage women and minorities to seek faculty positions.

In a September 1995 interview, Kalonji reported she lived in Seattle with her 3 sons.

Kalonji is a member of the LGBT community. She resided in downtown San Francisco with her partner of more than ten years, Denice Denton, a professor of electrical engineering and academic administrator. On June 24, 2006, one day following Denton's discharge from the Langley Porter Psychiatric Institute where she had been treated for depression, Denton leapt 33 stories to her death from The Paramount, a high-rise in which she shared an apartment with Kalonji.

In August 2007, Kalonji filed a lawsuit against Denton's estate seeking $2.25 million. Kalonji claimed Denton's failure to revise her will or name Kalonji as a beneficiary to her UC life insurance policy was inadvertent and a violation of their oral agreement. In July 2009, a probate judge awarded Kalonji one half of a Canadian vacation home that the couple had shared while giving the rest of Denton's estate to Denton's parents and siblings.

== Award and honors ==
In 1994, Kalonji won the George Westinghouse Award (ASEE). She is a Fellow of the American Association for the Advancement of Science.
