= M. R. C. Greenwood =

President of the University of Hawaiʻi until 2013

Mary Rita Cooke Greenwood
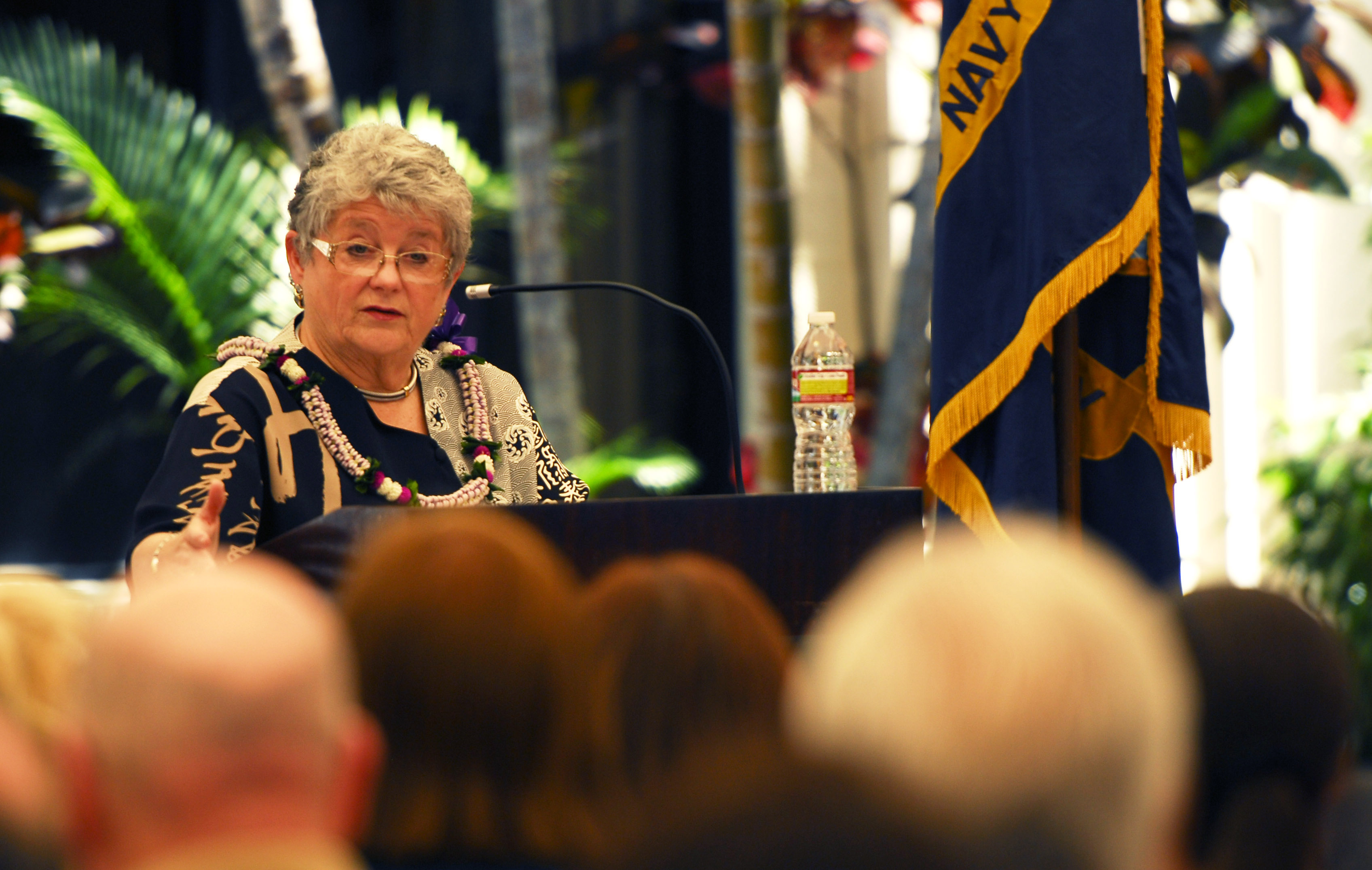
- Greenwood speaks to Navy leadership in 2011

14th President of the University of Hawaiʻi
- In office August 24, 2009 – August 31, 2013
- Preceded by: David McClain
- Succeeded by: David Lassner

7th Chancellor of the University of California, Santa Cruz
- In office July 1, 1991 – March 31, 2004
- Preceded by: Karl Pister
- Succeeded by: Martin Chemers (acting); Denice Denton

Personal details
- Born: Gainesville, Florida, U.S.
- Scientific career
- Education: Vassar College; Rockefeller University
- Fields: Human Nutrition
- Workplaces: Columbia University Medical School; Vassar College; University of California, Davis; White House Office of Science and Technology Policy; University of California, Santa Cruz; University of Hawaiʻi System
- Thesis: The regulation of body weight: Developmental, behavioral and physiological considerations (1973)

Mary Rita Cooke Greenwood is an American academic and nutritionist.

Greenwood served as president of the University of Hawaiʻi and chancellor of the University of California, Santa Cruz. She has held leadership positions in several academic and professional societies and has served in several scientific organizations within the United States government.

She currently holds an appointment as a Distinguished Professor Emerita of Nutrition and Internal Medicine at the University of California, Davis.

== Early life and education ==
Greenwood was born in 1943 in Gainesville, Florida. Greenwood earned the A.B. degree in biology, Summa cum laude, from Vassar College in 1968. She received her Ph.D. in physiology, Developmental Biology, and Neurosciences from Rockefeller University in 1973, and she completed a postdoctoral study in Human Nutrition at Columbia University in 1974.

== Career ==
She is best known for her position as the associate director for Science in the White House Office of Science and Technology Policy (confirmed by the US Senate) during the Clinton Administration. She also served as President of the American Association for the Advancement of Science in 1999. In addition, she has been President of the North American Association for the Study of Obesity (NAASO)—now the Obesity Society; and also President of the American Society of Clinical Nutrition.

Formerly an adjunct professor of Public Health and Nutrition at the University of California, Berkeley, she currently holds an appointment as a Distinguished Professor Emerita of Nutrition and Internal Medicine at the University of California, Davis.

She held various positions in the University of California system: as Provost and Senior Vice President for Academic Affairs, University of California Office of the President; Chancellor of University of California, Santa Cruz; and Dean of Graduate Studies and Vice Provost at University of California, Davis. During her time at chancellor, she oversaw the opening of the University of California system's first new residential college in 30 years. Her tenure oversaw the hiring of 250 new faculty members and academic programs were expanded by 52 percent.

In 2005, the University of California found that Dr. Greenwood had violated its conflict of interest rules related to a management position created for a colleague with whom she co-owned a rental property. The university found no evidence of improper conduct in a second allegation that she influenced a position held by her son at UC Merced, concluding no pattern of impropriety or ethics violations in regard to both matters that were thoroughly investigated. The university accepted Dr. Greenwood's resignation from the position and affirmed her return to the tenured professorship she formerly held at the University of California, Davis.

Greenwood became the President of the University of Hawaiʻi in 2009 and was the first woman to hold the position. During her tenure, she oversaw several major projects including the University of Hawaiʻi Cancer Center, the new University of Hawaiʻi at West Oʻahu campus, the University of Hawaiʻi at Hilo Hawaiian Language and Culture building, the Windward Community College Learning Center, the Maui Community College Science and Technology Center, the Kauaʻi Community College Campus Center project, the University of Hawaiʻi at Mānoa Campus Center and a new Information Technology Building. On May 6, 2013, Greenwood announced her retirement from the University of Hawaiʻi as president.

She was elected a member of the National Academy of Medicine in 1992, and in 2005, was elected a fellow of the American Academy of Arts and Sciences.

== Awards and fellowships ==
- New York State Regents Fellowship for Graduate Study, 1968
- Postdoctoral Fellowship, 1973–74
- NIH Postdoctoral Fellowship, 1974
- Mellon Scholar-in-Residence, St. Olaf College, Northfield, Minn., 1978
- NIH Research Career Development Award, 1978–83
- American Institute of Nutrition (AIN) Award in Experimental Nutrition (BioServ Award), 1982
- Endowed Chair – John Guy Vassar Chair for Natural Sciences, 1986-89
- Doctor of Humane Letters, Mount Saint Mary College, Newburgh, New York, 1989
- Associate Director for Science, OSTP, The Executive Office of the US president, 1993-1995
- Award of Support of Science Council of Scientific Society Presidents, 1994
- American Psychological Association, Presidential Citation, 1995
- Woman of the Year, Santa Cruz Chamber of Commerce, 1998
- Chairman, Board of Directors, American Association for the Advancement of Science, 1999–2000
- Woman of Achievement (Education), The Women's Fund, San Jose, 2001
- Distinguished Fellow (Science and Technology), California State University, Monterey Bay, 2001
- William D Carey Lecturer, American Association for the Advancement of Science, 2002
- The University of California, Santa Cruz Foundation Medal, 2004
- Member, California Council on Science and Technology, 2004
- American Academy of Arts and Sciences Fellow, 2005
- American Association for the Advancement of Science, Past President and Fellow, 1998–1999 & 2005
- American Society of Nutrition Fellow, 2009
- Member, Board of Governors, East-West Center, 2009- 13
- UC Davis College of Agricultural and Environmental Sciences Award of Distinction, 2010
- Member, APEC 2011 Hawai'i Host Committee, 2010–2011
- Honorary Doctorate Degree, University of the Ryukyus, 2011
- Woman of Distinction, Girl Scouts of Hawaii, 2011
- Wu Memorial Lecture, Columbia University Institute of Human Nutrition, 2012
- Chair, Council of Presidents, Association of Public and Land-Grant Universities, 2012
- Chair, Hawaii State Childhood Obesity Prevention Task Force, 2012

== Publications ==
- Greenwood, M.R.C. & Kovacs North, Karen (December 10, 1999). "Science Through the Looking Glass: Winning the Battles But Losing the War?". Science Magazine. 286 (5447): 2072–2078. doi:10.1126/science.286.5447.2072. S2CID 161066982.
- Greenwood, M.R.C. & Gerardi Riordan, Donna (2002). "Research Universities in the New Security Environment". Issues in Science and Technology. 18 (4): 35–39.
- Greenwood, M.R.C. (2003). "Risky Business: Research Universities in the Post-September 11 Era" (PDF). Science and Technology in a Vulnerable World. Supplement to AAAS Science and Technology Policy Yearbook.
- Greenwood, M.R.C. & Gerardi Riordan, Donna (2001). "Civic Scientist/Civic Duty". Science Communication. 23 (1): 28–40. doi:10.1177/1075547001023001003. S2CID 143447308.
- Greenwood, M.R.C.; Kovacs North, Karen & Dollenmayer, Judith (1999). "Whose Millennium? The University as a Medium of Culture". American Behavioral Scientist. 42 (6). doi:10.1177/00027649921954598. S2CID 144156945.

Academic offices
Preceded by Karl Pister	7th Chancellor of the University of California, Santa Cruz; 1991 – 2004	Succeeded by Martin Chemers (acting); Denice Denton
Preceded by David McClain	7th President of the University of Hawaiʻi System; 2009 – 2013	Succeeded by David Lassner
