= COPT Defense Properties =

Real estate investment trust

- Formerly: Corporate Office Properties Trust
- Type: Public company
- Traded as: NYSE: CDP; S&P 400 component
- Industry: Real estate investment trust
- Founded: 1988; 38 years ago
- Founder: Clay W. Hamlin III
- Headquarters: Columbia, Maryland, U.S.
- Key people: Stephen E. Budorick (CEO & President); Thomas F. Brady (Chairman); Anthony Mifsud (CFO)
- Products: Office buildings
- Revenue: ▲US$753 million (2024)
- Net income: ▲US$138 million (2024)
- Total assets: ▲US$4.254 billion (2024)
- Total equity: ▼US$1.493 billion (2023)
- Number of employees: 427 (2024)
- Website: www.copt.com

COPT Defense Properties is a real estate investment trust that invests in mission critical office buildings, that support or are in proximity to key U.S. Government defense installations. It primarily leases to the U.S. government and defense contractors. As of December 31, 2024, the company owned 164 office buildings comprising 16.5 million square feet and 31 single-tenant data centers comprising 5.9 million square feet.

== History ==
Previous logo

The company was founded in 1988 by Clay W. Hamlin III as Royale Investments, Inc. In 1991, the company became a public company via an initial public offering. In 1997, the company merged with Shidler Group, founded by Jay H. Shidler, and changed its name to Corporate Office Properties Trust. In 1998, the company acquired 16 buildings from Constellation Energy in exchange for a 41.5% stake in the company. Constellation sold its stake in the company in 2002. In 2005, Randall M. Griffin became chief executive officer of the company. In September 2023, the Company changed its name from Corporate Office Properties Trust to COPT Defense Properties.

== Tenants ==
The company's largest tenants are as follows:

Rank	Tenant	% of total 2024 revenue
1	General Services Administration	35.9%
2	Amazon.com	9.8%
3	General Dynamics	4.8%
4	Northrop Grumman	2.2%
5	Boeing	2.1%
6	CACI	2.1%
7	Peraton	2.0%
8	Booz Allen Hamilton	1.8%
9	Undisclosed	1.7%
10	Morrison & Foerster	1.4%
