= Tom Apple =

American scientist

Thomas Mark Apple, chancellor of the University of Hawaiʻi at Mānoa June 2012 – August 2014 is a scientist whose research focuses on magnetic resonance spectroscopy. As the chief executive officer of the university, he was responsible for the leadership, administration and management of the academic enterprise. His tenure as chancellor was marked by conflicts with deans, other university leaders, and community leaders.

Before joining University of Hawaiʻi at Mānoa, Apple served as provost of the University of Delaware. Prior to that, he was dean of the College of Arts and Sciences at that campus. He has also held key positions at the Rensselaer Polytechnic Institute in New York, including vice provost, dean of graduate education, interim vice provost for institute diversity, and chair of the department of chemistry.

A native of Bethlehem, Pennsylvania, Apple received his doctorate in physical chemistry from the University of Delaware, and his Bachelor of Science in biology from Pennsylvania State University. He is a published author with numerous works in a variety of journals, including Chemistry of Materials, Macromolecules, and Journal of Materials Research.
