= Jay H. Shidler =

American investor and philanthropist (born 1946)

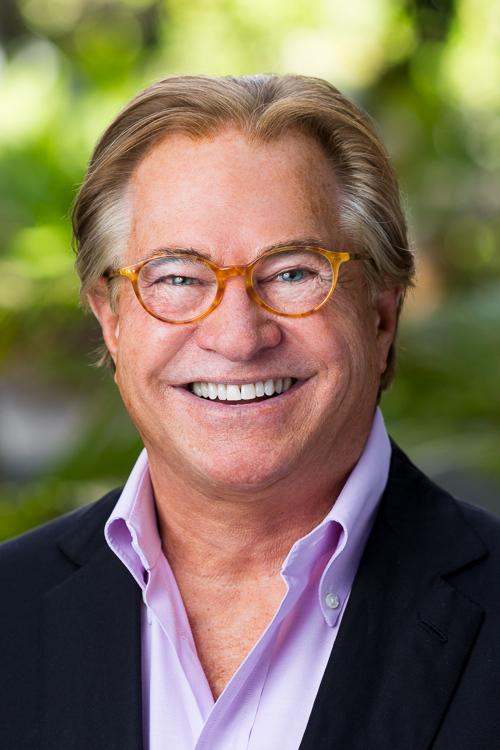
- Born: April 20, 1946; Pasadena, California U.S.
- Education: Shidler College of Business at the University of Hawaiʻi, Honolulu, Hawaii
- Occupations: Managing Partner, The Shidler Group
- Spouse: Wallette Sue (Amoy) Shidler
- Children: Summer Lei D'Anna

Jay Harold Shidler (/ʃaɪd-lər/ SHīd-ler; born April 20, 1946) is an American investor and philanthropist. Shidler is the managing partner of The Shidler Group, a national real estate investment organization and is the Chairman of the Board of Trustees of The Shidler Family Foundation.

== Early life and education ==
Born in Pasadena, California, Jay H. Shidler, the son of a career U.S. Army officer and a homemaker, grew up on numerous military bases around the world. Shidler attended the University of Hawaiʻi and graduated in 1968 with a bachelor's degree in business administration.

After graduating from the University of Hawaiʻi, Shidler was commissioned a second lieutenant in the U.S. Army Corps of Engineers. Returning to Hawaii in 1971 as a First Lieutenant, Jay Shidler formed the real estate investment firm The Shidler Group.

== Career ==
Since forming The Shidler Group in 1971, Shidler has acquired and owned more than 2,000 commercial properties in 40 U.S. states and Canada. He founded and was the initial investor in over 30 public and private companies five becoming listed on the NYSE as publicly traded corporations.

Shidler was co-founder and the initial Chairman of TriNet Corporate Realty Trust (TriNet), which he took public and listed on the NYSE (NYSE: TRI). TriNet was one of the real estate industry's first publicly traded REITs focused exclusively on net leased commercial properties. Headquartered in San Francisco, TriNet became the largest publicly traded company specializing in sale/leaseback transactions. In 1999, TriNet and Starwood Financial, Inc. (AMEX: APT) merge to form iStar Inc. (NYSE: STAR).

Shidler was co-founder and the initial Chairman of First Industrial Realty Trust, Inc. (First Industrial), which he took public and listed on the NYSE (NYSE: FR). Headquartered in Chicago, First Industrial was one of the industry's first publicly traded REITs to focus exclusively on industrial property.

Shidler was co-founder, with Clay Hamlin III, and the initial Chairman of Corporate Office Properties Trust (Corporate Office), which he took public and listed on the NYSE (NYSE: OFC). Headquartered in Columbia, Maryland, Corporate Office Properties was one of the first REITs to focus on serving the specialized requirements of United States Government agencies and defense contractors.

== Personal life ==
Shidler has been a Hawaii resident since 1964 and has been married to Wallette (Amoy) Shidler since 1970.

== Philanthropy and The Shidler Family Foundation ==
Shidler and The Shidler Family Foundation continue to support numerous cultural and educational institutions. Shidler has made significant donations to the University of Washington School of Medicine, the University of Washington School of Law, and the University of Hawaiʻi at Mānoa.

Over the past decade, Shidler's transformational gifts to the Shidler College of Business at the University of Hawaiʻi has helped the College become one of the top ranked business schools in the nation.

=== Naming Gift (2006) ===
In 2006, Shidler donated $31 million to the College of Business at the University of Hawaiʻi at Mānoa in Honolulu. The college, renamed the Shidler College of Business, used the gift to increase student scholarships and faculty research support, expand academic programs, provide matching gift opportunities, and renovate and upgrade classrooms, buildings and the surrounding environment.

=== Visionary Gift (2014-2015) ===
In 2014, Shidler gave an additional $69 million commitment to the Shidler College of Business, growing his total gift to $100 million. The gifts included cash and interests in the land subject to long-term ground leases (leased fee interests) underlying U.S. office buildings and hotels.

The initial land gifts included the leased fee interests in the land under office buildings in the CBDs of Chicago, Illinois; Charlotte, North Carolina; Denver, Colorado; Columbus, Ohio; and Nashville, Tennessee.

During 2015, the land gifts expanded to include leased fee interests in the land underlying 19 Marriott and Hilton hotels including the Marriott Fairfield Inn & Suites Midtown Penn Station in New York City as well as hotels in Chicago, Atlanta, Charlotte, Nashville, Raleigh, and Orlando.

As he was fulfilling his $69 million commitment, Shidler gave an additional $11 million, bringing the total gift to the College to $111 million.

=== Innovation Gift (2017) ===
In October 2017, Shidler donated an additional $117 million, in cash and real estate ground leases, increasing his total gift to $228 million. Shidler's $228 million gift is the largest individual donation in the 110-year history of the University of Hawaiʻi, and makes him the second largest known donor to any public business school nationwide.

Income from ground lease payments will provide steady and increasing revenue to the College. Over the life of the 99-year ground leases, contractual income to the Shidler College of Business will average $21 million a year and total $2.1 billion. That income stream will be used to fund renovations and new programs, and will materially increase the number of available scholarships.

After each ground lease expires, the ownership of each office building and hotel will revert to the College. At that time, it is estimated that the College's stake in this portfolio will be worth in excess of $5.1 billion.

=== Accolades ===
On the 100th anniversary of its formation AACSB International (Association to Advance Collegiate Schools of Business) named Shidler one of the world's 100 most influential leaders in making an impact on business education. Other individuals honored included Mohamed Alabbar, Chairman Emaar Properties; Gary P. Brinson, The Brinson Foundation; Richard Liu, Co-Founder of JD.Com; Colin Powell, Former U.S. Secretary of State; John Stumpf, Chairman Wells Fargo; and Sam Walton, Founder of Walmart.

== Shidler College of Business ==
The Shidler College of Business at the University of Hawaiʻi at Mānoa is accredited by the Association to Advance Collegiate Schools of Business. U.S. News & World Report 2018 edition ranks the College among the top 20 percent of business programs in the nation, ranking 16th (tied with Brigham Young University) in the nation in Undergraduate International Business.
