= Denice Denton =

American academic administrator (1959–2006)

Ninth Chancellor of the University of California, Santa Cruz
- In office February 14, 2005 – June 24, 2006
- Preceded by: M. R. C. Greenwood; Martin Chemers (acting)
- Succeeded by: George R. Blumenthal

Personal details
- Born: August 27, 1959 El Campo, Texas, US
- Died: June 24, 2006 (aged 46) San Francisco, California, US
- Domestic partner: Gretchen Kalonji
- Education: Massachusetts Institute of Technology
- Profession: Electrical engineer, professor, administrator
- Scientific career
- Fields: Electrical engineering
- Workplaces: University of Massachusetts Lowell; University of Wisconsin–Madison; ETH Zürich; University of Washington
- Thesis: Moisture transport in polyimide films in integrated circuits (1987)

Denice Dee Denton (August 27, 1959 – June 24, 2006) was an American professor of electrical engineering and academic administrator. She was the ninth chancellor of the University of California, Santa Cruz.

== Early years ==
Denton was born in El Campo, Texas, in Wharton County. She was the oldest child of Bob Glenn Denton and Carolyn Irene Drab. Denton earned her bachelor's and master's degrees (1982), EE (1983) and PhD (1987) in electrical engineering from the Massachusetts Institute of Technology. Denton spent two summers and an academic year in the late 1970s and early 1980s at Fairchild Semiconductor, where her projects included 64K static RAM design. After graduation, she accepted a professorship at the University of Wisconsin–Madison in the Department of Computer and Electrical Engineering, which was interested in her work in plasma deposition and polymerization. She was the first woman to win tenure in engineering, and she was quickly promoted to full professor.

== Career ==
Denton held academic appointments at the University of Massachusetts Lowell and the Swiss Federal Institute of Technology in Zürich. In 1996, Denton was hired as the Dean of the College of Engineering and professor of electrical engineering at the University of Washington. She was the first woman in the United States to lead an engineering college of a major research university.

Denton received attention for her response to Harvard President Larry Summers' suggestion, in January 2005, that one of the reasons that women had achieved less in science could be innate differences between the sexes. "Of course he has the right to say anything and of course there are biological differences," Denton said. "What some of us were concerned about is that his hypotheses were not grounded in the best and latest scholarly work, and could be refuted by anyone in the field."

=== University of California ===
Denton was the first openly gay, and at 45, the youngest person to be appointed to be chancellor in the University of California system by UC President Robert Dynes. She succeeded Martin Chemers, who served as acting chancellor following the resignation of M. R. C. Greenwood who became the University of California Provost.

Denton's recruitment package would eventually include a $275,000 salary, $68,750 as a moving allowance, improvements to the chancellor's on-campus residence which included a $30,000 dog pen initially budgeted at $7,000. Included in the deal was a tenured professorial appointment with a $192,000 salary, and a housing assistance allowance of up to $50,000 for her partner, Gretchen Kalonji.

Although much of the 7,000 square feet (650 m^{2}) of her residence was used for campus functions, the approximately $600,000 renovation cost, and overall cost of Denton's recruitment brought criticism. This contrasts sharply against increasing student fees, up 79 percent in four years, and low pay raises for clerical and service staff.

After an April 2005 campus protest over these issues resulted in the arrest of 19 students, 200 faculty signed a petition condemning her "unwarranted" use of force. She also was allegedly a victim of personal harassment, in the form of verbal insults. A barricade was tossed through her guest-bedroom window on June 10, 2005. Protesters advocating higher wages for custodians blocked Denton in her car outside her office for about five minutes on June 6, 2006, while performing a skit about racism.

On April 5, 2005, anti-war protesters forced military recruiters at a campus career fair to leave campus. Denton received dozens of threatening phone calls and e-mails. When it was discovered that protest was listed as a "credible threat" on the TALON database managed by the Pentagon's Counterintelligence Field Agency, Denton helped persuade California Senators Boxer and Feinstein to request an investigation. Ultimately, campus protests were removed from the database.

== Personal life ==
Denton, who was openly lesbian, resided part-time in downtown San Francisco with her partner of more than ten years, Gretchen Kalonji, a professor of materials science. On June 24, 2006, one day following Denton's discharge from the Langley Porter Psychiatric Institute where she had been treated for depression, she committed suicide by jumping from her high rise apartment.

In August 2007, Denton's partner Gretchen Kalonji filed a lawsuit against Denton's estate seeking $2.25 million. Kalonji claims Denton's failure to revise her will or name Kalonji as a beneficiary to her UC life insurance policy was inadvertent and a violation of their oral agreement. In July 2009, a probate judge awarded Kalonji only one-half of a Canadian vacation home that the coupled had shared while giving the rest of Denton's estate to Denton's parents and siblings.

== Honors and awards ==
Among other numerous awards she won the Maria Mitchell Women in Science Award (2006), a national recognition of exceptional work that advances opportunities in the sciences for women and girls; the NOGLSTP LGBTQ+ Educator of the Year Award (2006); the IEEE/HP Harriett B. Rigas Award (1995); the ASEE George Westinghouse Award (1995); the W. M. Keck Foundation Engineering Teaching Excellence Award (1994); the Benjamin Smith Reynolds Teaching Award (University of Wisconsin–Madison, 1994); the Eta Kappa Nu C. Holmes MacDonald Distinguished Young Electrical Engineer National Teaching Award (1993); the American Society of Engineering Education AT&T Foundation Teaching Award (1991); the Kiekhofer Distinguished Teaching Award (University of Wisconsin–Madison, 1990); and the National Science Foundation (NSF) Presidential Young Investigator Award (1987). Portland State University Maseeh College of Engineering has endowed its Best Woman Engineer award after Denton.

Academic offices
Preceded by M. R. C. Greenwood; Martin Chemers (acting)	9th Chancellor of the University of California, Santa Cruz; 2005 – 2006	Succeeded by George R. Blumenthal
