= George Westinghouse Award (ASEE) =

- Awarded for: a young engineering educator of outstanding ability to recognize and encourage his or her contributions to improving engineering teaching
- Presented by: American Society for Engineering Education
- First award: 1946
- Final award: 1999

The George Westinghouse Award, named after George Westinghouse, was given by the American Society for Engineering Education (ASEE) for outstanding contributions to engineering education. It was awarded to "a young engineering educator of outstanding ability to recognize and encourage his or her contributions to improving engineering teaching".

The award was established by the Westinghouse Foundation in 1946, last issued in 1999 and consisted of an honorarium and a certificate.

== Recipients ==
The following people received the George Westinghouse Award:

- 1940: Ray A. Simpson - Hoover Dam
- 1946: James N. Goodier
- 1947: B. Richard Teare, Jr.
- 1948: Hunter Rouse
- 1949: Joseph Marin
- 1950: Rolf Eliassen
- 1951: Glenn Murphy
- 1952: Gordon S. Brown
- 1953: Edward F. Obert
- 1954: Thomas J. Higgins
- 1955: Robert R. White
- 1956: Milton C. Shaw
- 1957: Robert E. Greybal
- 1958: Willis W. Harman
- 1959: Max S. Peters
- 1960: R. Byron Bird
- 1961: David C. White
- 1962: Paul M. Naghdi
- 1963: Mac E. Van Valkenburg
- 1964: Cedomir M. Sliepcevich
- 1965: John G. Truxal
- 1966: Ali B. Cambel
- 1967: Charles L. Miller
- 1968: Klaus D. Timmerhaus
- 1969: Arthur E. Bryson, Jr.
- 1970: Ali A. Seireg
- 1971: Charles E. Wales
- 1972: Jack P. Holman
- 1973: Martin D. Bradshaw
- 1974: Joseph Bordogna
- 1975: Donald G. Childers
- 1976: Jerome B. Cohen
- 1977: Roger A. Schmitz
- 1978: C. Judson King
- 1979: J. Michael Duncan
- 1980: William B. Krantz
- 1981: Leroy S. "Skip" Fletcher
- 1982: Stephen J O'Brien
- 1983: Frank P. Incropera
- 1984: Phillip C. Wankat
- 1985: Sunder H. Advani
- 1986: Gerald W. Clough
- 1987: John H. Seinfeld
- 1988: Thomas F. Edgar
- 1989: Kenneth E. Case
- 1990: Y.A. Liu
- 1991: Magdy F. Iskander
- 1992: Nicholas A. Peppas
- 1993: Rajendra Singh
- 1994: Gretchen Kalonji
- 1995: Denice Denton
- 1996: C. Stewart Slater
- 1997: Cristina H. Amon
- 1998: James P. Schaffer
- 1999: Pradeep K. Khosla

== See also ==
- List of engineering awards
