= Leroy S. Fletcher =

American academic engineer

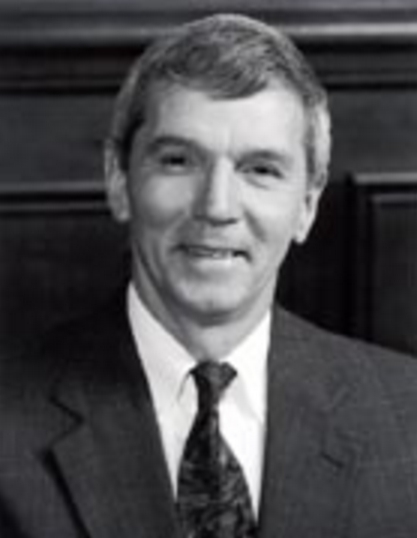
L. S. "Skip" Fletcher

Leroy Stevenson (Skipp) Fletcher (born October 10, 1936) is an American mechanical and aerospace engineer, and college dean, who served as the 104th president of the American Society of Mechanical Engineers in 1985–86, and was recipient of the 2002 ASME Medal.

== Biography ==
=== Youth, education and early career ===
Born in San Antonio in 1936, son of Robert Holton Fletcher and Jennie Lee Fletcher. He obtained his BSc from Texas A&M University in 1958, and his MSc in 1963 and Engineering degree in 1964, both from Stanford University. Last he obtained his PhD in mechanical engineering from the Arizona State University in 1968.

Fletcher had started his career as aerospace engineer at Ames Aeronautical Laboratory, and continued his work as research scientist in 1960 at the Ames Research Center. In 1962 he joined the Stanford University faculty as assistant heat transfer for a year, and assistant thermodynamics for another year. And, in 1964-65 he was assistant mechanical engineer at the Arizona State University.

=== Further career, honours and awards ===
After his graduation from the Arizona State University in 1965, Fletcher joined the Rutgers University faculty as instructor. In 1968 he became assistant professor and later professor of aerospace engineering until 1975, the last year also as acting associate dean. From 1975 to 1980 he was professor mechanical and aeronautical engineering at the University of Virginia. In 1980 he returned to the Texas A&M University, where he served the rest of his academic career, as associate dean, professor in mechanical engineering, and research director.

Among others, Fletcher served as director of the American Society for Engineering Education in 1974–1977, president of the American Society of Mechanical Engineers in 1985–86, and president of the American Institute of Aeronautics and Astronautics in 1996–97. In 1999 Fletcher has appointed the new Director of Aeronautics at NASA Ames Research Center.

Among others Fletcher was awarded Charles Russ Richards Award, the Lee Atwood Award, and the George Westinghouse Award (ASEE) in 1981; the Ralph Coats Roe Award in 1983; the Energy Systems Award in 1984; the Donald E. Marlowe Award 1986; the Thermophysics Award in 1992; the Leighton W. Collins Award in 1993; the Heat Transfer Memorial Award 1996; the Frank J. Malina Astronautics Medal in 1997; the Vector de Oro Award in 2000; the Benjamin Garver Lamme Award in 2001; the AAAS Award for Science Diplomacy, the ASME Medal, and the Linton Grinter Award in 2002; the Award for International Science Cooperative in 2003; and the James Watt International Gold Medal in 2005.

== Selected publications ==
- Fletcher, Leroy S., ed. Aerodynamic heating and thermal protection systems. American Institute of Aeronautics and Astronautics, 1978.
- Fletcher, Leroy S., ed. Proceedings of the ASME Conference on Mechanical Engineering Education, 1980. American Society of Mechanical Engineers, 1981.
- Fletcher, Leroy S. Screw-thread gaging systems for determining conformance to thread standards. Vol. 37. Amer Society of Mechanical, 1996.

Articles, a selection

- Fletcher, Leroy S., Valentinas Sernas, and Lawrence S. Galowin. "Evaporation from thin water films on horizontal tubes." Industrial & Engineering Chemistry Process Design and Development 13.3 (1974): 265–269.
- Fletcher, Leroy S., Valentinas Sernas, and Walter H. Parken. "Evaporation heat transfer coefficients for thin sea water films on horizontal tubes." Industrial & Engineering Chemistry Process Design and Development 14.4 (1975): 411–416.
- Madhusudana, C. V., and Leroy S. Fletcher. "Contact heat transfer - the last decade." AIAA journal 24.3 (1986): 510–523.

Patents, a selection

- Fletcher, Leroy S., and George P. Peterson. "Micro-heat-pipe catheter." U.S. Patent No. 5,190,539. 2 Mar. 1993.
- Peterson, George P., and Leroy S. Fletcher. "Temperature control mechanisms for a micro heat pipe catheter." U.S. Patent No. 5,417,686. 23 May 1995.
