= V. Vance Roley =

V. Vance Roley is the Dean of the Shidler College of Business at the University of Hawaiʻi. Roley is also First Hawaiian Bank Distinguished Professor of Leadership and Management. Roley was named Dean of the Shidler College of Business Administration in January 2005 after 21 years at the University of Washington. At the University of Washington, he was Acting Dean and the Hughes M. Blake Professor of Finance at the School of Business. Prior to joining the University of Washington, Roley served as economist and Assistant Vice President of the Federal Reserve Bank of Kansas City. He also served a one-year term as senior economist on the President's Council of Economic Advisers during the Carter Administration with University of Hawaii President David McClain. Roley received his master's degree and Ph.D. degrees from Harvard University and his undergraduate degree from the University of California, Berkeley. Roley is also a member of the Board of Directors of risk management software and information company Kamakura Corporation.
