= University of Hawaiʻi at Mānoa =

Public university in Honolulu, Hawaii, US

- Ke Kulanui o Hawaiʻi ma Mānoa (Hawaiian)
- Former names: College of Agriculture and Mechanic Arts of the Territory of Hawaiʻi (1907–1912); College of Hawaiʻi (1912–1919); University of Hawaiʻi (1919–1972)
- Motto: Maluna aʻe o nā lāhui āpau ke ola ke kānaka (Hawaiian); On seal: Mālamalama (Hawaiian)
- Motto in English: "Above all nations is humanity" On seal: "Enlightenment"
- Type: Public land-grant research university
- Established: March 23, 1907; 119 years ago
- Parent institution: University of Hawaiʻi
- Accreditation: WSCUC
- Academic affiliations: APRUU; ASAIHL; UARC; URA; Sea-grant; Space-grant; Sun-grant
- Endowment: $632.1 million (2025) (system-wide)
- Chancellor: Vassilis Syrmos
- President: Wendy Hensel
- Provost: Denise Konan (interim)
- Students: 20,012 (Fall 2024)
- Location: Honolulu, Hawaii, United States; 21.297°N 157.817°W
- Campus: 320 acres (1.3 km^{2}); Island city
- Other campuses: Kahului; Pago Pago
- Newspaper: Ka Leo O Hawaiʻi
- Colors: Green and white
- Nickname: Rainbow Warriors & Rainbow Wāhine
- Sporting affiliations: NCAA Division I – Big West; Mountain West; MPSF; PCCSC
- Website: manoa.hawaii.edu

The University of Hawaiʻi at Mānoa (Note: The university's official name is spelled using the traditional Hawaiian names, with an okina in Hawaiʻi and a diacritic in Mānoa.) (Note: Also referred to as University of Hawaiʻi–Mānoa, UH Mānoa, Hawaiʻi, or simply UH; Hawaiian: Ke Kulanui o Hawaiʻi ma Mānoa) is a public land-grant research university in Honolulu, Hawaii, United States. It is the flagship campus of the University of Hawaiʻi system and houses the main offices of the system. Most of the campus occupies the eastern half of the mouth of Mānoa Valley on Oʻahu, with the John A. Burns School of Medicine located adjacent to Kakaʻako Waterfront Park.

UH offers over 200 degree programs across 17 colleges and schools. It is accredited by the WASC Senior College and University Commission and governed by the Hawaii State Legislature and a semi-autonomous board of regents. It is also a member of the Association of Pacific Rim Universities.

Mānoa is classified among "R1: Doctoral Universities – Very high research activity". It is a land-grant university that also participates in the sea-grant, space-grant, and sun-grant research consortia; it is one of only three such universities in the country to participate in all four consortia (Oregon State University and Pennsylvania State University are the others). UH and its subsidiary, the Applied Research Laboratory, is one of only fourteen University Affiliated Research Centers (UARC) of the United States Department of Defense and is one of five UARCs in the country for the United States Navy.

Notable UH alumni include Patsy Mink, Robert Ballard, Richard Parsons, and the parents of Barack Obama – Barack Obama Sr. and Stanley Ann Dunham. 44 percent of Hawaii's state senators and 51 percent of its state representatives are UH graduates.

== History ==
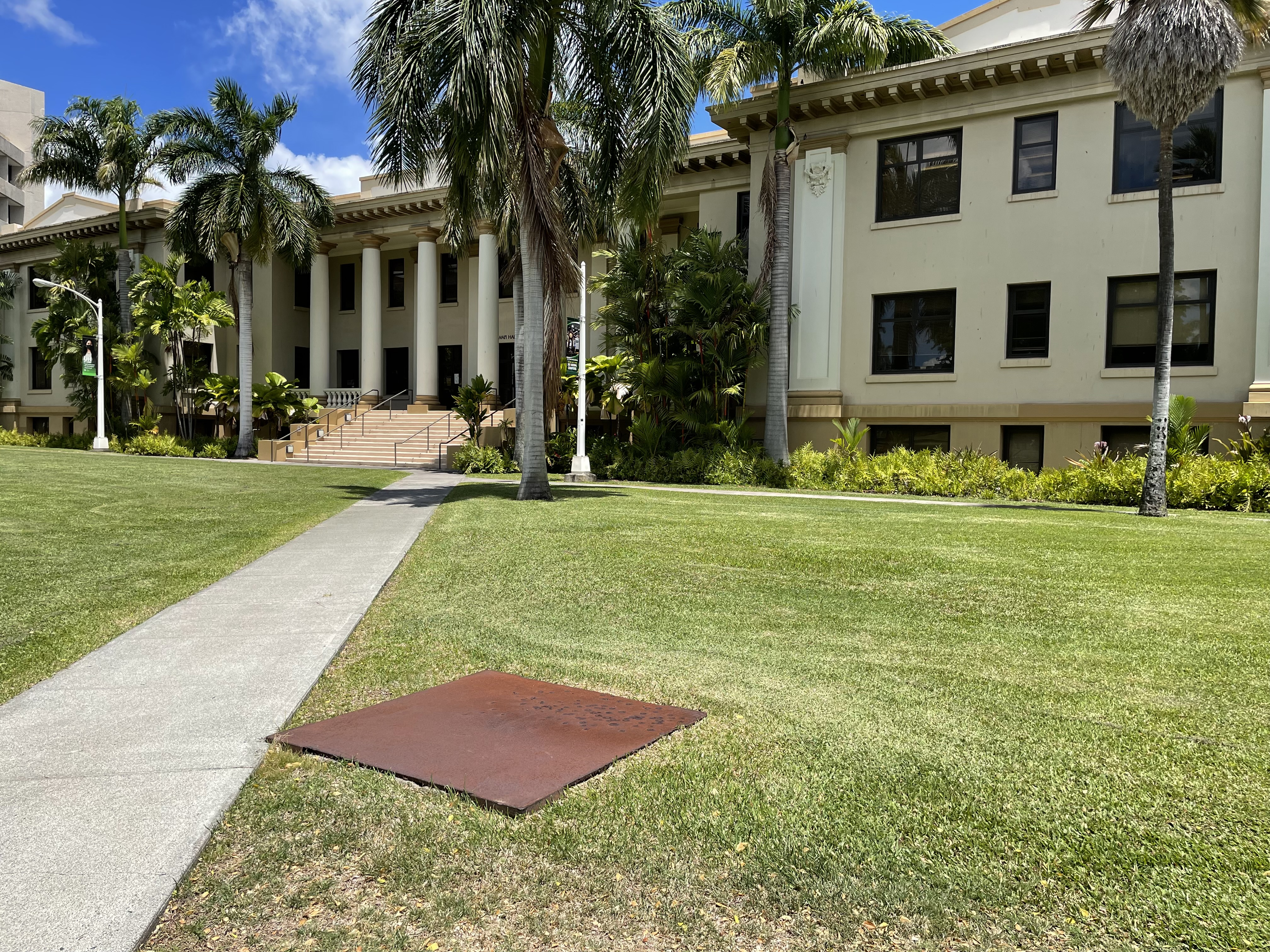
Hawaiʻi Hall was the heart of the University of Hawaiʻi when it opened in 1912. It housed classrooms, administrative offices, and the campus's library.

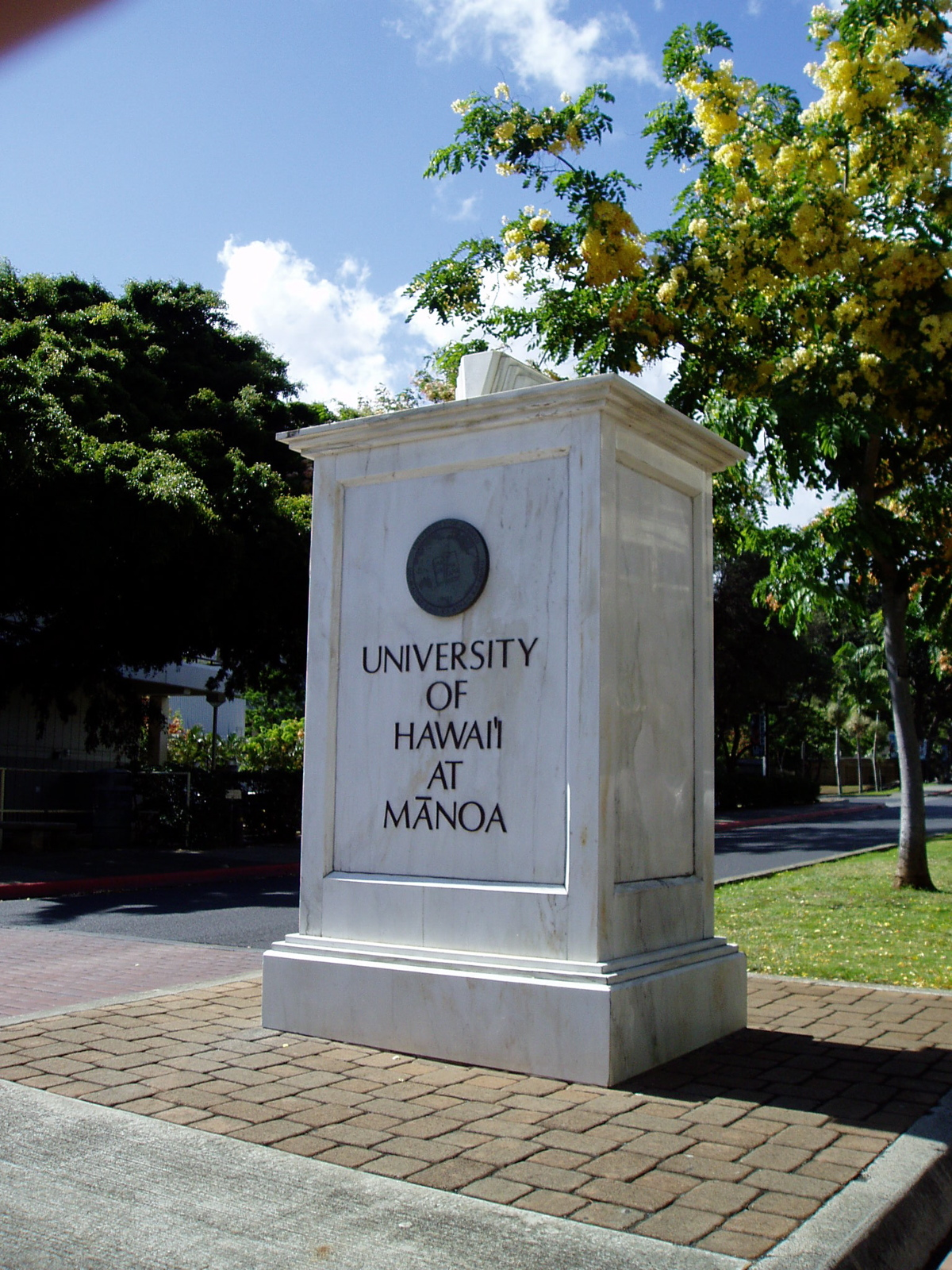
Entrance to UH Mānoa campus

=== Founding ===
The University of Hawai'i at Manoa was founded in 1907 as a land-grant college of agriculture and mechanical arts establishing "the College of Agriculture and Mechanic Arts of the Territory of Hawaiʻi and to Provide for the Government and Support Thereof". The bill, backed by Maui Senator William J. Huelani Coelho through the initiatives of Native Hawaiian legislators, a newspaper editor, petition of an Asian American bank cashier, and a president of Cornell University, was introduced into the Territorial Legislature March 1, 1907 as Act 24. It was signed into law March 25, 1907 by Governor George Carter, which officially established the College of Agriculture and Mechanic Arts of the Territory of Hawaiʻi under a five-member Board of Regents on the corner of Beretania and Victoria streets (now the location of the Honolulu Museum of Art School).

The Board of Regents first selected J.E. Roadhouse of the University of California to head the new college in October 1907 but he had died before leaving Berkeley. With classes scheduled to start in February 1908, the regents persuaded Willis T. Pope, vice principal of the Territorial Normal School, to head the college for its first semester. In Spring 1908, the regents appointed John W. Gilmore, professor of agriculture at Cornell University, as the college's first president. The Cornell connection would strongly influence the shaping of the new college, even today. It officially became an institution of higher learning on September 14, 1908, when it enrolled 5 freshmen registered for a bachelor of science degree. Willis T. Pope went on to become the Superintendent of Public Instruction in the Territory of Hawai’i from 1910 until 1913 and later a professor of botany and horticulture at the university.

In September 1912 it moved to its present location in Mānoa Valley on 90 acres of land that had been cobbled together from leased and private lands and was renamed the College of Hawaii. William Kwai Fong Yap, a cashier at Bank of Hawaii, and a group of citizens petitioned the Hawaii Territorial Legislature six years later for university status which led to another renaming finally to the University of Hawaiʻi on April 30, 1919, with the addition of the College of Arts and Sciences and College of Applied Science.

In the years following, the university expanded to include more than 300 acres. In 1931 the Territorial Normal School was absorbed into the university, becoming Teacher's College, now the College of Education.

=== 20th century ===
The university continued its growth throughout the 1930s and 1940s increasing from 232 to 402 acres. The number of buildings grew from 4 to 17. Following the attack on Pearl Harbor in December 1941, classes were suspended for two months while the Corps of Engineers occupied much of the campus, including the Teacher's College, for various purposes. The university's ROTC program was put into active duty, which made the campus resemble a military school. When classes resumed on February 11, 1942, about half of the student and faculty body left to enter the war or military service. Students who returned to campus found classes cancelled due to lack of faculty and were required to carry gas masks to classes and bomb shelters were kept at a ready. Once the war was over, student enrollment grew faster than the university had faculty and space for.

In 1947, the university opened an extension center in Hilo on Hawaiʻi Island in the old Hilo Boarding School. In 1951, Hilo Center was designated the University of Hawaii Hilo Branch before its reorganization by an act of the Hawaiʻi State Legislature in 1970.

By the 1950s, enrollment increased to more than 5,000 students, and the university had expanded to include a Graduate Division, College of Education, College of Engineering, College of Business Administration, College of Tropical Agriculture, and College of Arts and Sciences.

When Hawaiʻi was granted statehood in 1959, the university became a constitutional agency rather than a legislative agency with the Board of Regents having oversight over the university. Enrollment continued to grow to 19,000 at the university through the 1960s and the campus became nationally recognized in research and graduate education.

In 1965, the state legislature created a system of community colleges and placed it within the university at the recommendations of the Department of Health, Education and Welfare's report on higher education in Hawaii and UH President Thomas H. Hamilton. By the end of the 1960s, the University of Hawaiʻi was very different from what it had since its beginning. It had become larger and with the addition of the community colleges, a broad range of activities extending from vocational education to community college education, which were all advanced through research and postdoctoral training.

The university was renamed the University of Hawaiʻi at Mānoa to distinguish it from other campuses in the University of Hawaiʻi System in 1972.

== Campus ==
University of Hawaiʻi at Mānoa campus

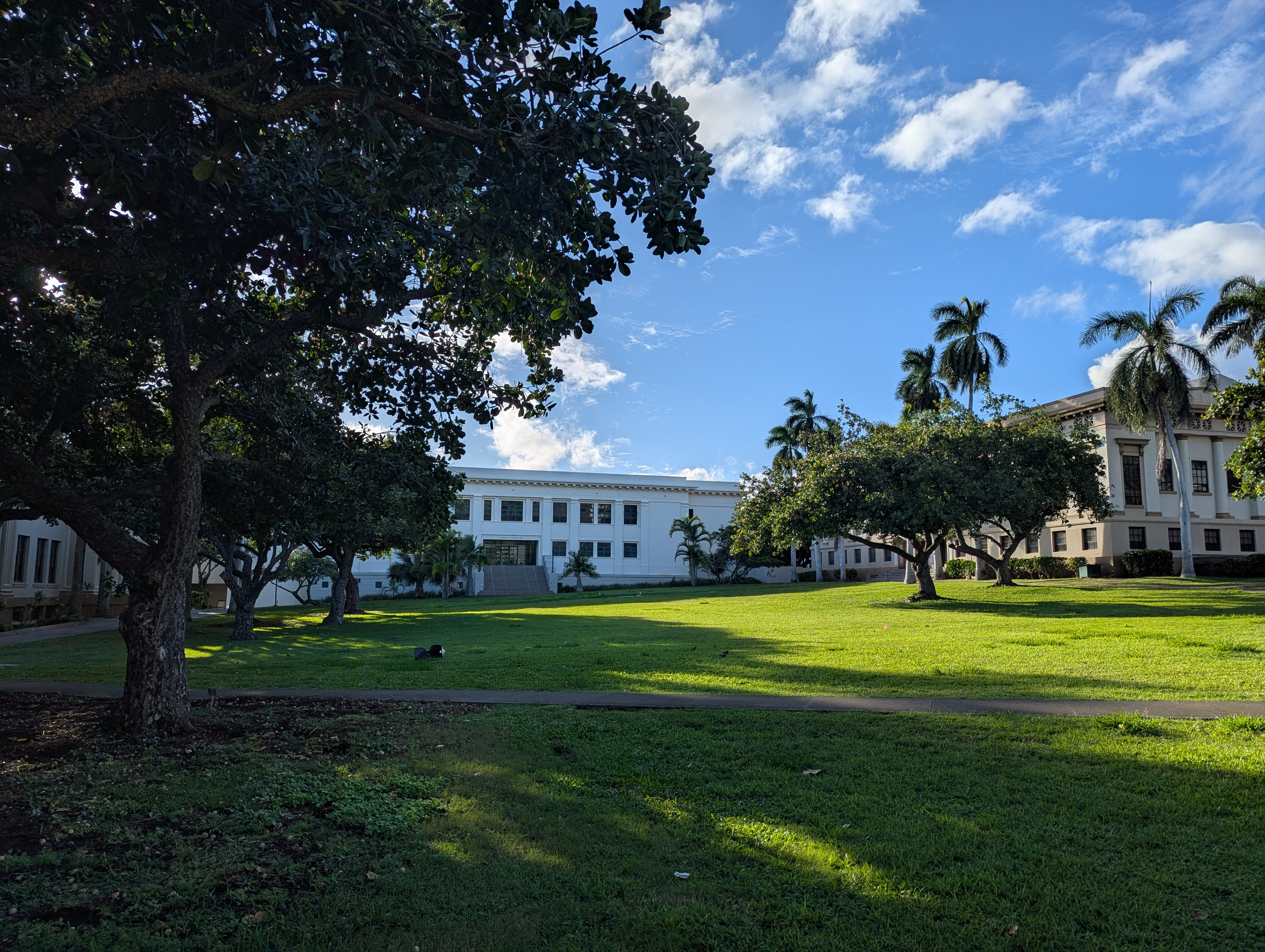
Quadrangle
(view as a 360° interactive panorama)

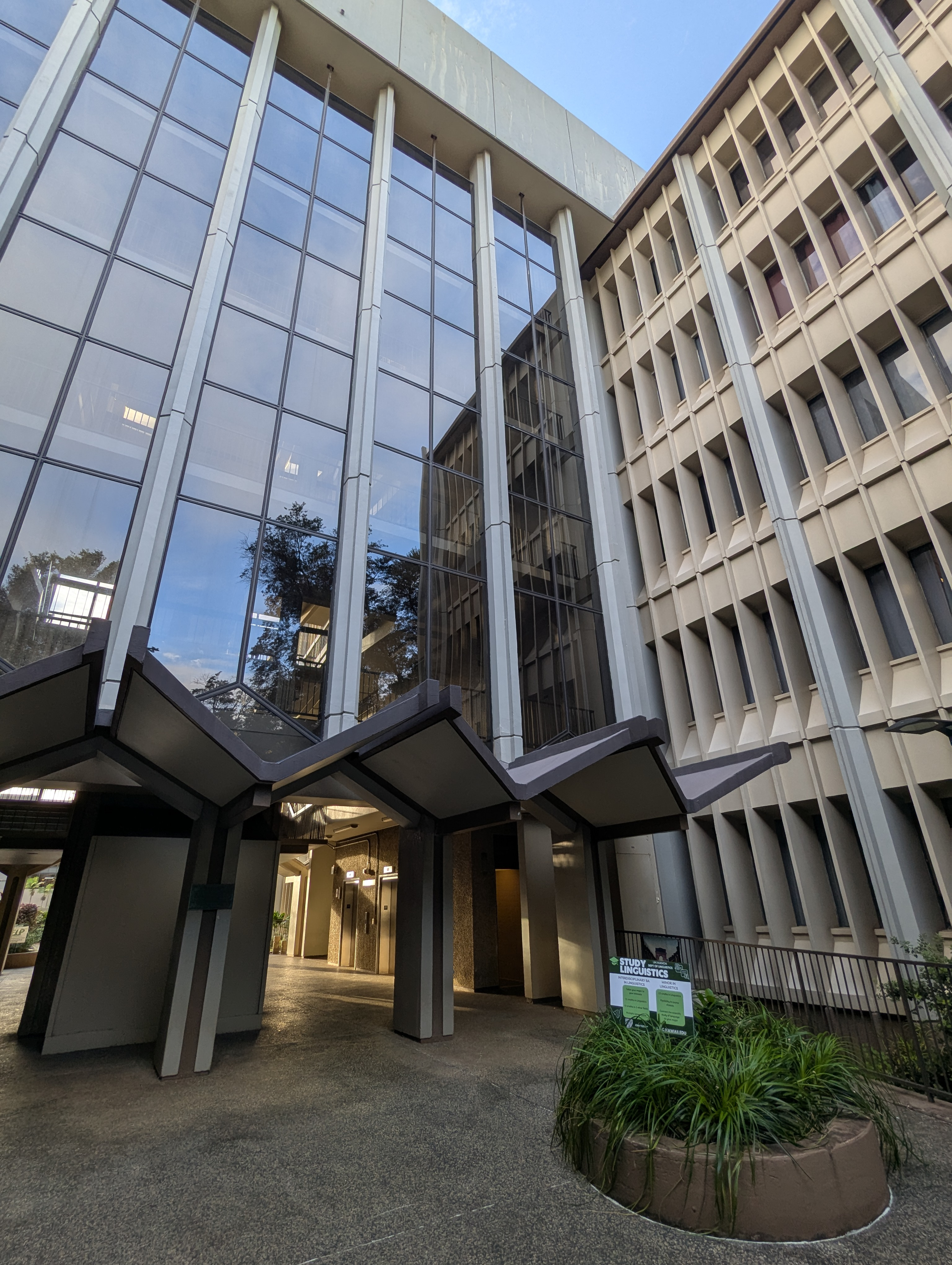
Moore Hall

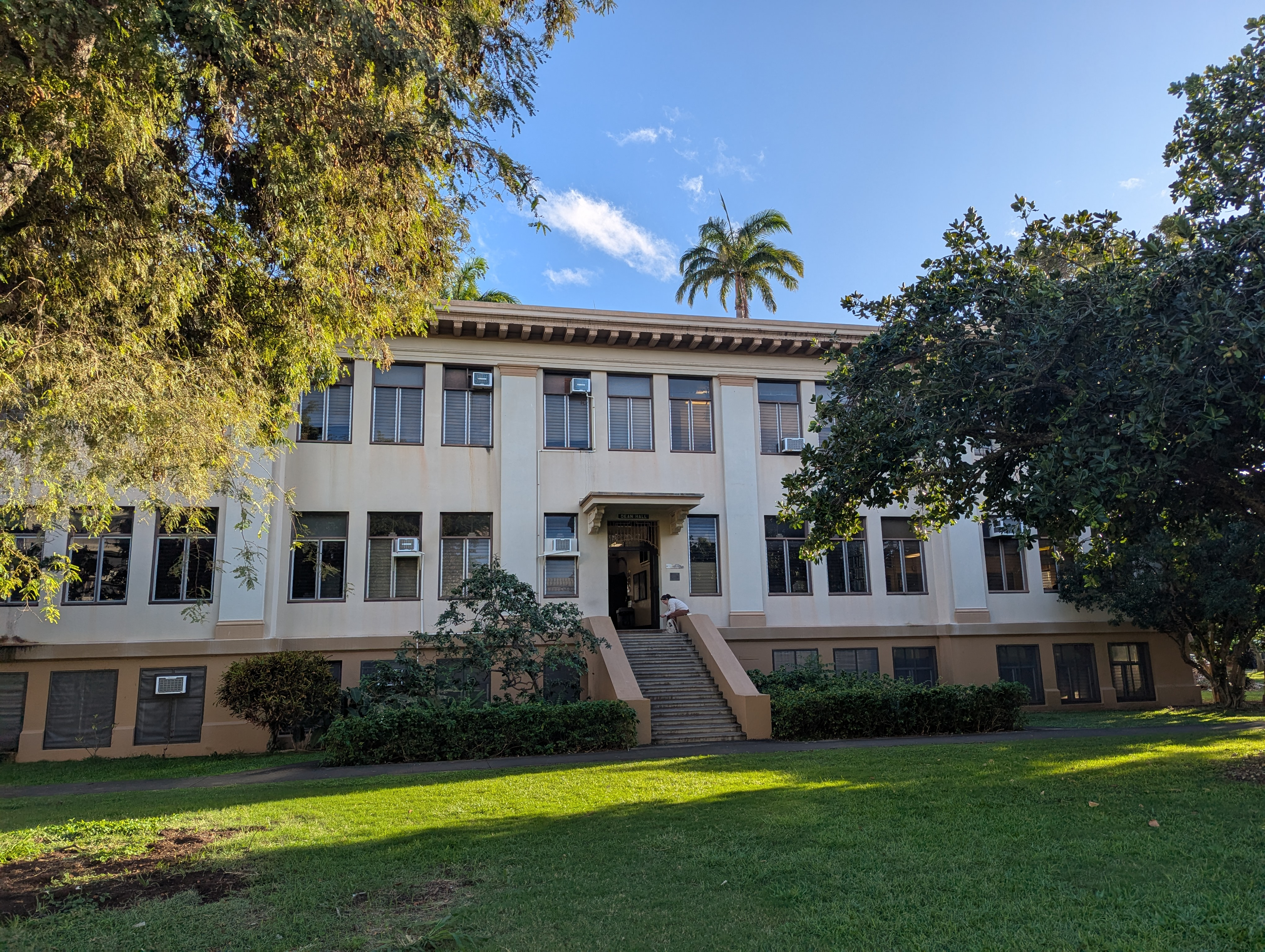
Dean Hall

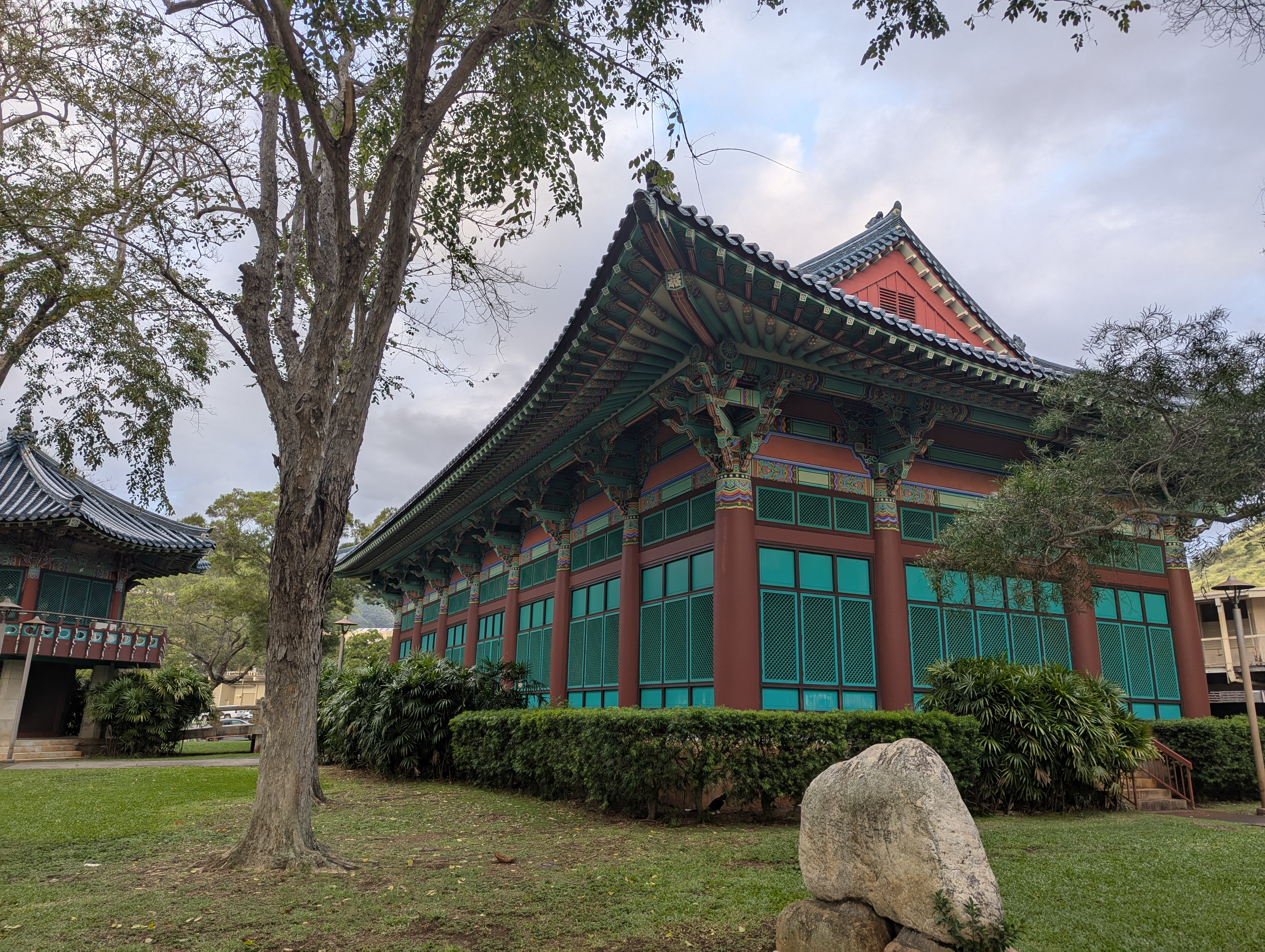
Center for Korean Studies

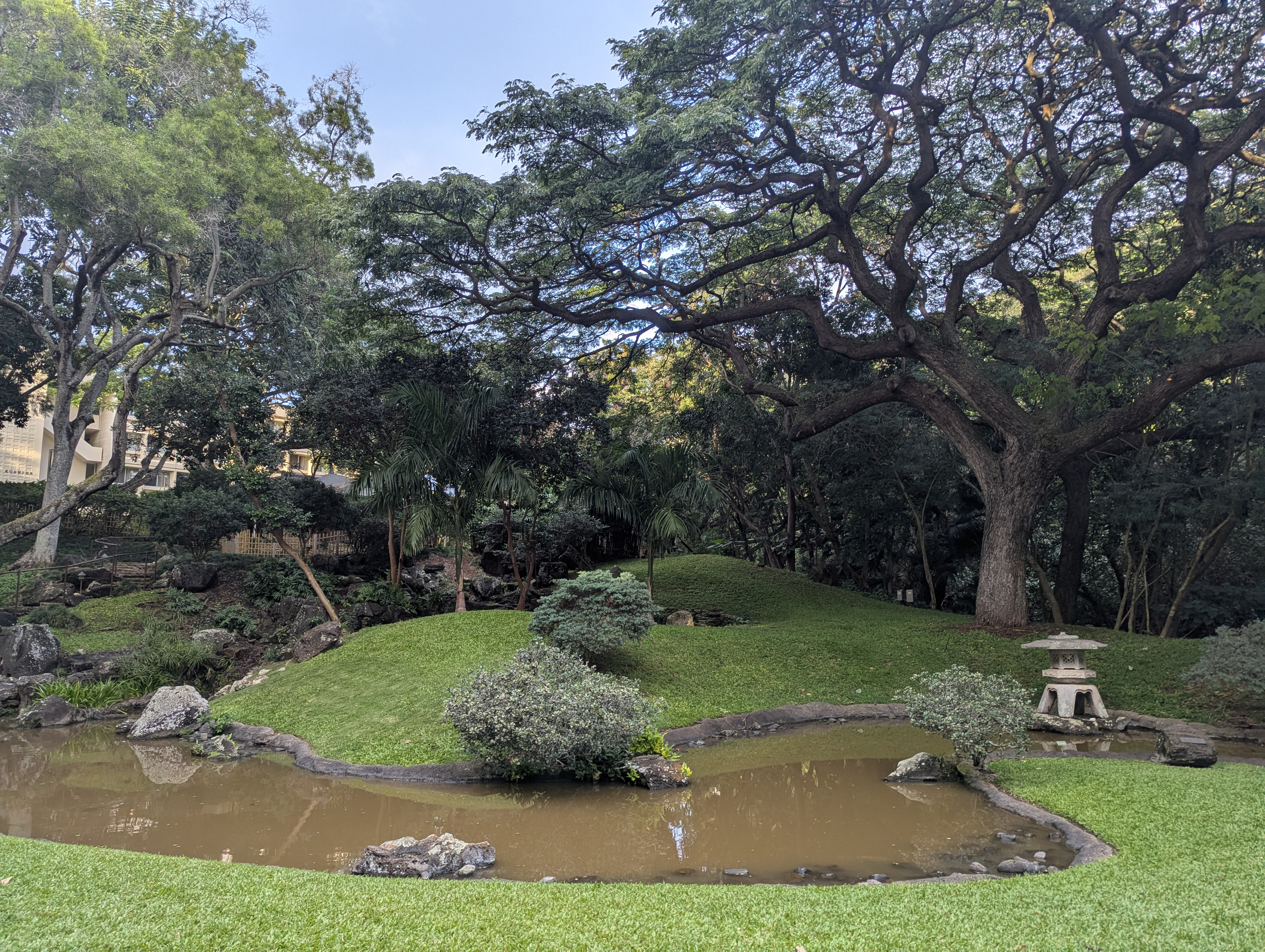
East-West Center Japanese Garden

== Organization and administration ==
The University of Hawaiʻi at Mānoa operates within the University of Hawaiʻi System, which is governed by an 11-member board of regents who are nominated by the Regents Candidate Advisory Council, appointed by the governor, and confirmed by the State of Hawaiʻi legislature. The board also appoints the president of the University of Hawaiʻi System, who provides leadership for all 10 campuses, including as the chief executive of UH Mānoa. Day-to-day academic and operational management of UH Mānoa is the responsibility of the Provost.

=== University of Hawaiʻi president (pre-1965) ===
When UH began as the College of Hawaiʻi, Willis T. Pope was acting dean from 1907 to 1908, despite declining the title of "acting president." Since that initial period, the University of Hawaiʻi at Mānoa has always been led by a president, chancellor, or provost, including interim or acting roles.

From 1908 to 1965, the president of the University of Hawaiʻi, before the creation of the University of Hawaii System (UH System), was chief executive of the university. Technical and community colleges and Hilo College operated separately from what would later become the UH System.

No.	Image	President	Term of office	Notes
-	-	Willis T. Pope	1907–1908	Was "acting dean" until the Board of Regents could hire a permanent president.
1		John W. Gilmore	1908–1913	A graduate of Cornell University and an agriculture professor who established schools in China and the Philippines. Forced to resign.
-	-	John Donaghho (acting)	1913–1914	-
2	-	Arthur L. Dean	1914–1927	A graduate of Harvard, he oversaw the transformation of the College of Hawaiʻi into the University of Hawaiʻi and growth of the university from 21 students to 874.
3	-	David L. Crawford	1927–1941	-
-		Arthur R. Keller (acting)	1941–1942	
4	-	Gregg M. Sinclair	1942–1955	-
5	-	Paul S. Bachman	1955–1957	Died in office just 14 months after taking office.
-	-	Willard Wilson (acting)	1957–1958	Was acting president after the death of Paul S. Bachman.
6	-	Laurence H. Snyder	1958–1963	-
7	-	Thomas H. Hamilton	1963–1968	Was president of the university until 1965 and both as president and chancellor from 1965 to 1968. Resigned amid protests related to the Vietnam War and controversial faculty tenure cases.

=== Creation of the University of Hawaiʻi System ===
In 1965, the Hawaii State Legislature created the University of Hawaiʻi System, which incorporated the technical and community colleges into the university. The President's role was expanded to include oversight of the new university system.

No	Image	President	Term of office	Notes
7	-	Thomas H. Hamilton	1963–1968	Was president of the university until 1965 and both as president and chancellor from 1965 to 1968. Resigned amid protests related to the Vietnam War and controversial faculty tenure cases.
-	-	Robert W. Hiatt (acting)	1968–1969	-
-	-	Richard S. Takasaki (acting)	1969	-
8		Harlan Cleveland	1969–1974	A graduate of Princeton University. Created UH Hilo and appointed the first chancellor for the university. Resigned in the fall of 1973.

=== Introduction of the chancellor role ===
In 1974, the role of chancellor was established to handle campus-specific leadership, allowing the UH President to focus on system-wide governance.

Presidents

No	Image	President	Term of office	Notes
9	-	Fujio Matsuda	1974–1984	Retired from the university.

Chancellors

- 1974–1984: multiple chancellors

=== Return to combined leadership (1984–2001) ===
In 1984, the role of the chancellor was dissolved and the president resumed direct oversight of UH Mānoa.

No	Image	President	Term of office	Notes
10	-	Albert J. Simone	1984–1992	Resigned in late 1991 to become president of the Rochester Institute of Technology (RIT).
-	-	Paul C. Yuen (acting)	1992–1993	-
11	-	Kenneth P. Mortimer	1993–2001	-

=== Reintroduction of the chancellor (2001–2017) ===
In 2001, the position of chancellor was re-established by UH System president Evan Dobelle over conflict of interest concerns.

Presidents

No	Image	President	Term of office	Notes
12	-	Evan S. Dobelle	2001–2004	
13	-	David McClain	2004–2009	
14	-	M.R.C. Greenwood	2009–2013	Retired at the end of 2013.

Chancellors
No	Image	President	Term of office	Notes
-	-	Deane Neubauer (interim)	2001–2002	-
1	-	Peter Englert	2002–2005	-
-	-	Denise Konan	2005–2007	-
2		Virginia Hinshaw	2007–2012	-
3	-	Tom Apple	2012–2014	-
-	-	Robert Bley-Vroman (interim)	2014–2017	-

=== President and provost (2017–present) ===
The Provost role was established to handle the academic and operational affairs of UH Mānoa, while the President served as the chief executive of the university and retained overall UH System leadership. This reorganization was made to create a governance structure similar to other major research universities, such as the University of Washington and Indiana University.

Presidents
No	Image	President	Term of office	Notes
15		David Lassner	2017–2024	Appointed as president of the University of Hawaii System in 2014 and provided directed oversight of the university in 2017 when the Board of Regents removed the role of the chancellor.
16	-	Wendy Hensel	2025–present	-

Provosts
No	Image	President	Term of office	Notes
1	-	Michael S. Bruno	2019–2025	Bruno announced he would be stepping down as Provost effective July 1, 2025, returning as an Ocean Engineering Professor in the university's School of Ocean and Earth Science and Technology.
-	-	Vassilis Syrmos (interim)	2025–Present	Appointed interim provost by UH President Hensel effective July 1, 2025, taking over for former Provost Bruno.

== Academics ==
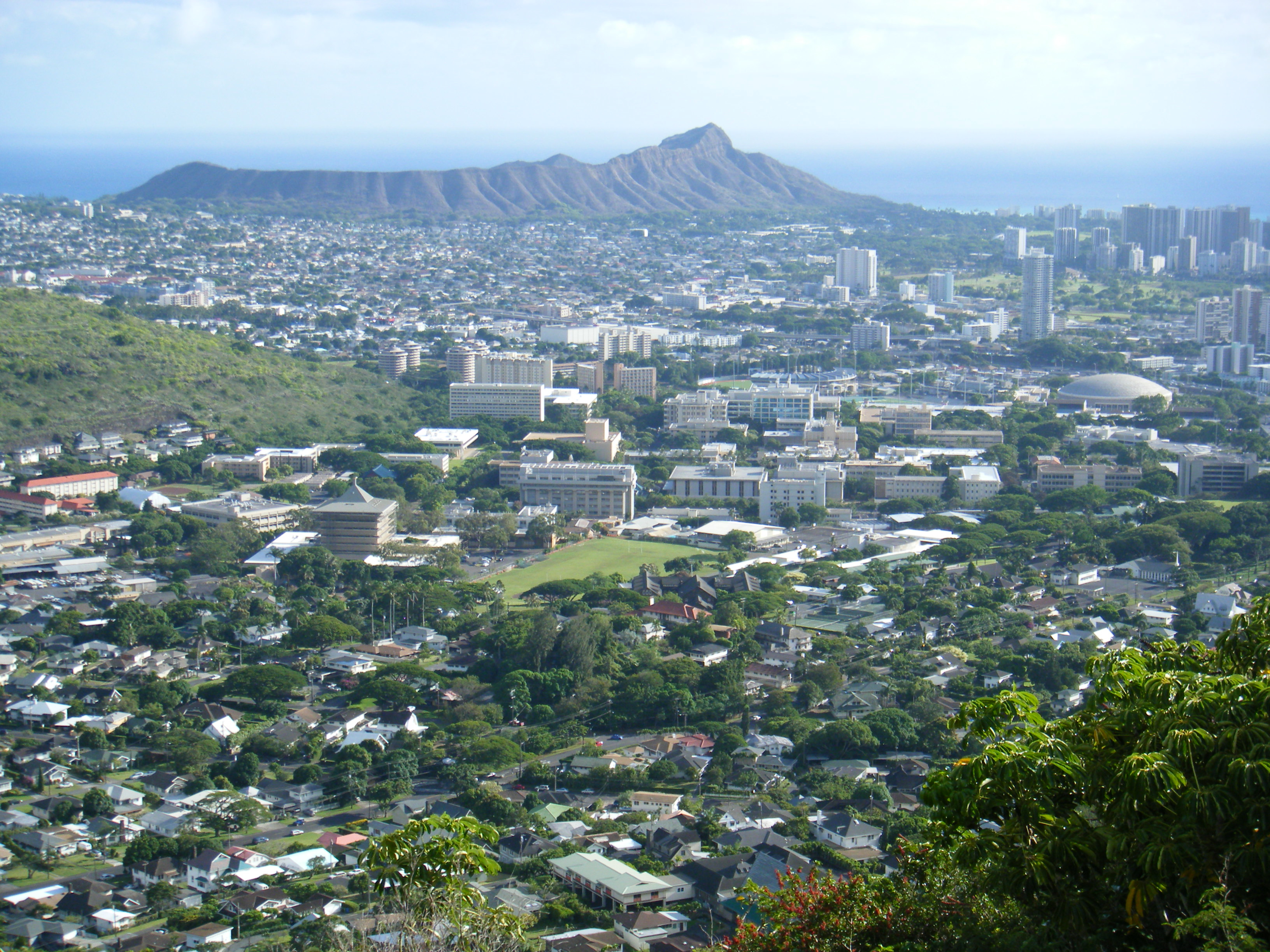
UH Mānoa campus viewed from Round Top Drive, with Diamond Head in the background

UH Mānoa, the flagship campus of the University of Hawaiʻi System, is a four-year research university consisting of 17 schools and colleges. In addition to undergraduate and graduate degrees in the School of Architecture, School of Earth Science and Technology, the College of Arts, Languages, and Letters, the Shidler College of Business, the College of Education, and the College of Engineering, the university also maintains professional schools in law and medicine.

Together, the colleges and schools of the university offer bachelor's degrees in 93 fields of study, master's degrees in 84 fields, doctoral degrees in 51 fields, first professional degrees in five fields, post-baccalaureate degrees in three fields, 28 undergraduate certification programs, and 29 graduate certification programs.

=== Schools and colleges ===
==== Tropical Agriculture and Human Resilience ====
Originally called the College of Agriculture and Mechanic Arts of the Territory of Hawaiʻi and formerly the College of Applied Sciences, the College of Tropical Agriculture & Human Resources (CTAHR) is the founding college of the university. Programs of the college focuses on tropical agriculture, food science and human nutrition, textiles and clothing, and Human Resources. The name of the college was changed in October 2024 to the College of Tropical Agriculture & Human Resilience.

==== Education ====
The college was established as the Honolulu Training School in 1895 to prepare and train teachers and then Territorial Normal and Training School after Hawaiʻi became a territory in 1905. As the school outgrew its location on the Punchbowl side of Honolulu, a new campus was to be constructed on the corner of University Avenue and Metcalf Street. The first two buildings constructed by the Territorial Department of Public instruction became known as Wist Hall and Wist Annex 1. The normal school was eventually merged into the University of Hawaiʻi in 1931 as the Teacher's College. In 1959, the name was changed to the College of Education.

==== Arts, Languages, and Letters ====
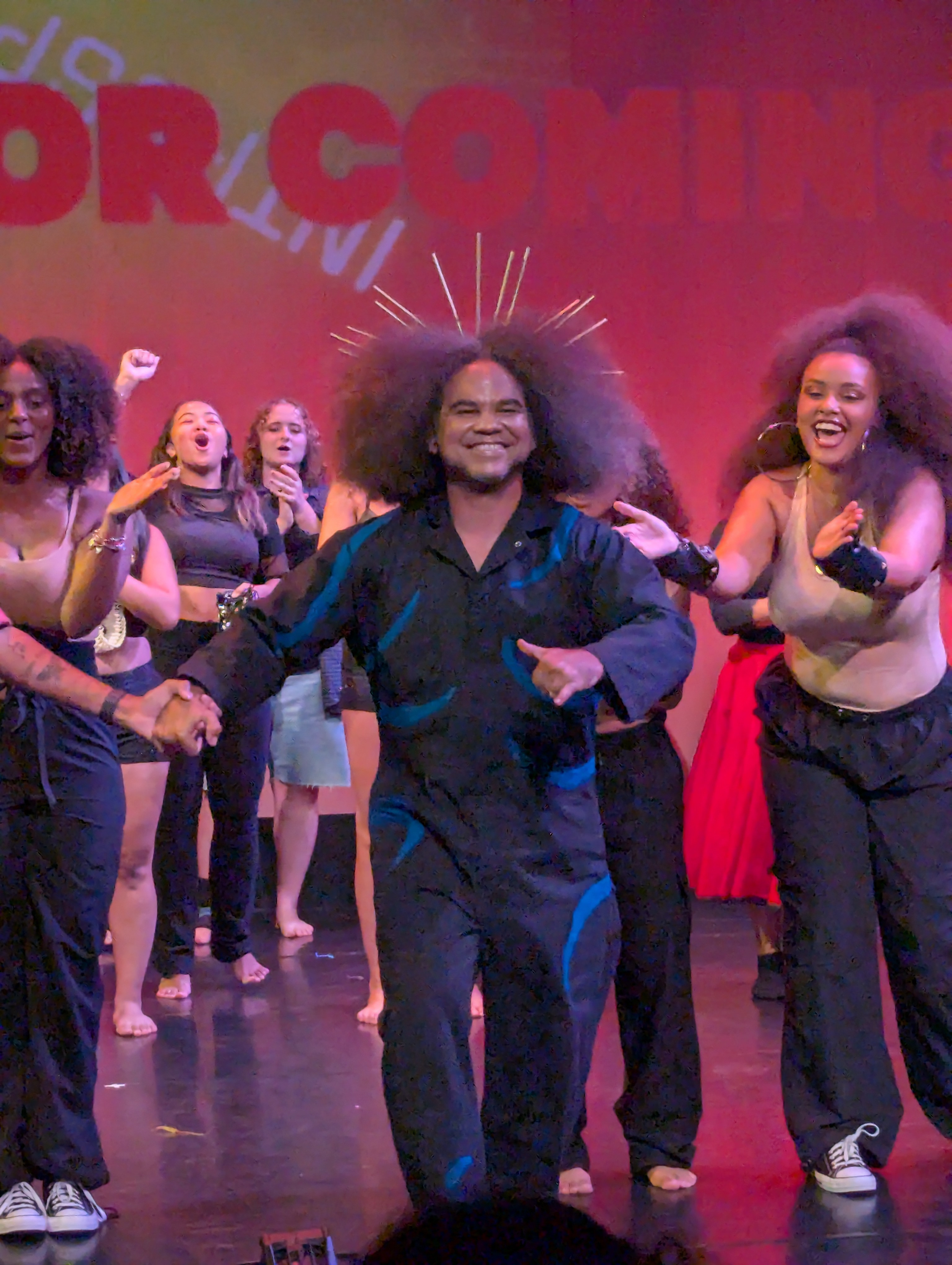
A spring dance concert at the university

The College of Arts, Languages, and Letters (CALL) is the newest and largest college at the university. It was created following the dissolution of the College of Arts and Science and the merger of the Colleges of Arts and Humanities, Languages, Linguistics, and Literature (LLL) and the School of Pacific and Asian Studies. The college's core focus is the study of arts, humanities, and languages with a particular focus on Hawaiʻi, the Pacific, and Asia Studies.

==== Business ====
The College of Business Administration was established in 1949 with programs in accounting, finance, real estate, industrial relations, and marketing. The college was renamed the Shidler College of Business on September 6, 2006, after real-estate executive Jay Shidler, an alumnus of the college, who donated $25 million to the college.

==== Nursing ====
The School of Nursing was established in 1951, even though courses in nursing had been offered since 1932 with a partnership with Queen's Hospital School of Nursing.

=== Library ===
The University of Hawaiʻi at Mānoa Library, which provides access to 3.4 million volumes, 50,000 journals, and thousands of digitized documents, is one of the largest academic research libraries in the United States, ranking 86th in parent institution investment among 113 North American members of the Association of Research Libraries.

=== Honors program ===
The UH Mānoa offers an Honors Program to provide additional resources for students preparing to apply to professional school programs. Students complete core curriculum courses for their degrees in the Honors Program, maintain at least a cumulative 3.2 grade-point average in all courses, and complete a senior thesis project.

=== Rankings ===
Academic rankings

National
- Forbes: 385
- U.S. News & World Report: 171 (tie)
- Washington Monthly: 247
- WSJ/College Pulse: 260

Global
- ARWU: 301–400
- QS: =546
- THE: 201–250
- U.S. News & World Report: 483 (tie)

National program rankings
Program	Ranking
Biological Sciences	130
Chemistry	145
Clinical Psychology	88
Computer Science	119
Earth Sciences	41
Education	69
Engineering	152–200
English	108
Fine Arts	124
History	98
Law	96
Library & Information Studies	28
Mathematics	127
Medicine: Primary Care	56
Medicine: Research	62
Nursing: Doctorate	74
Physics	71
Political Science	96
Psychology	112
Public Affairs	101
Public Health	89
Rehabilitation Counseling	47
Social Work	51
Sociology	102
Speech–Language Pathology	170

Global program rankings
Program	Ranking
Arts & Humanities	155
Clinical Medicine	744
Engineering	496
Environment/Ecology	185
Geosciences	66
Plant & Animal Science	279
Social Sciences & Public Health	257
Space Science	112

The National Science Foundation ranked UH Mānoa 45th among 395 public universities for Research and Development (R&D) expenditures in fiscal year 2014.

According to U.S. News & World Report's rankings for 2021, UH Mānoa was tied at 170th overall and 159th for "Best Value" among national universities; tied at 83rd among public universities; and tied at 145th for its undergraduate engineering program among schools that confer doctorates.

=== Distance learning ===
The university offers over 50 distance learning courses, using technology to replace either all or a portion of class instruction. Students interact with their instructors and peers from different locations to further develop their education.

For the 2024–2025 academic year, the middle 50% of enrolled students scored between 1050 and 1350 on the SAT (with a 50th percentile of 1200), between 530 and 680 on the SAT Evidence-Based Reading and Writing section (50th percentile: 610), and between 520 and 670 on the SAT Math section (50th percentile: 590).

== Research ==
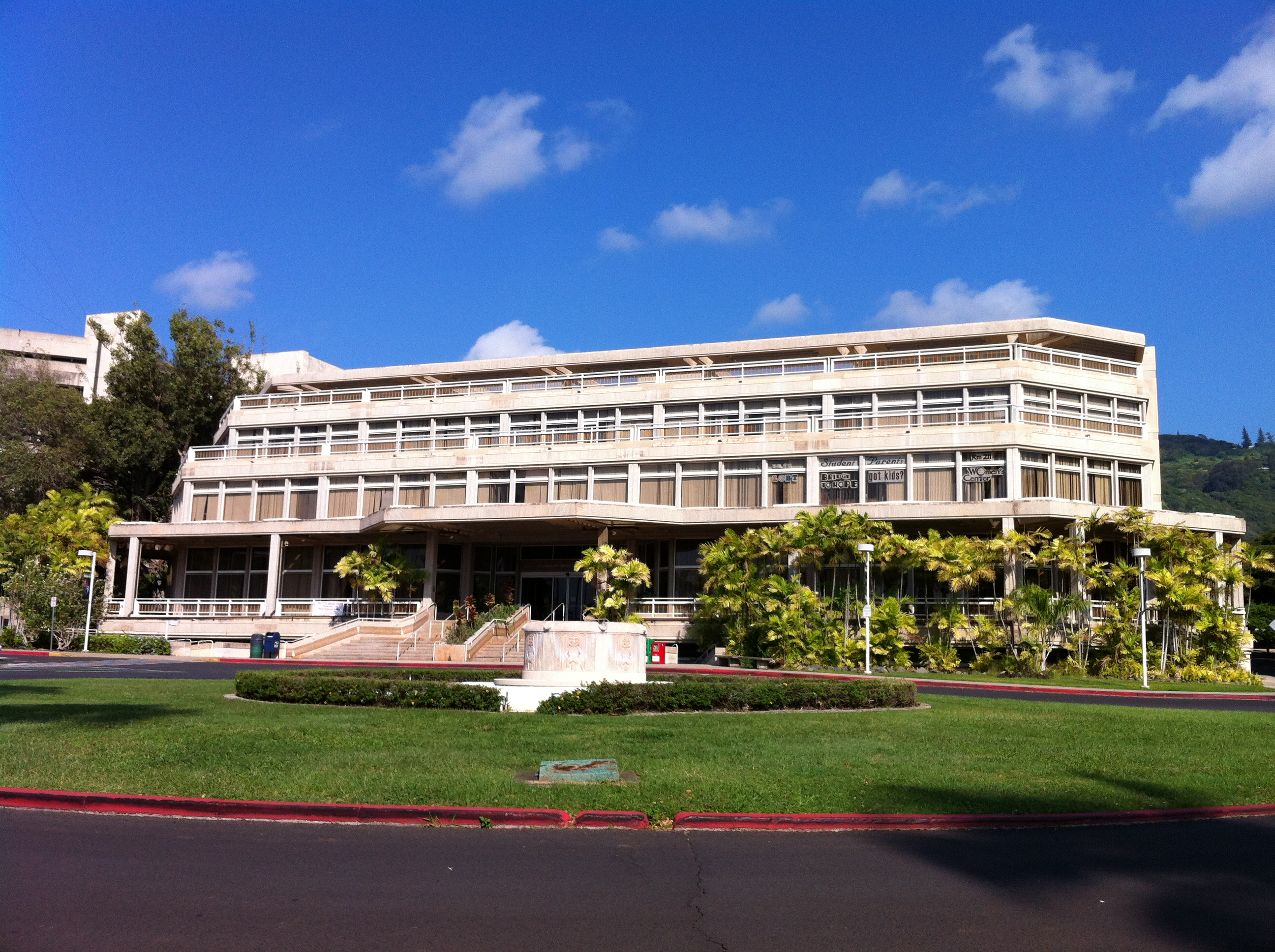
Queen Liliʻuokalani Center for Student Services

With extramural grants and contracts of $436 million in 2012, research at UH Mānoa relates to Hawaii's physical landscape, its people and their heritage. The geography facilitates advances in marine biology, oceanography, underwater robotic technology, astronomy, geology and geophysics, agriculture, aquaculture and tropical medicine. Its heritage, the people and its close ties to the Asian and Pacific region create a favorable environment for study and research in the arts, genetics, intercultural relations, linguistics, religion and philosophy.

According to the National Science Foundation, UH Mānoa spent $276 million on research and development in 2018, ranking it 84th in the nation. Extramural funding increased from $368 million in FY 2008 to nearly $436 million in FY 2012. Research grants increased from $278 million in FY 2008 to $317 million in FY 2012. Non-research awards totaled $119 million in FY 2012. Overall, extramural funding increased by 18%.

For the period of July 1, 2012 to June 20, 2013, the School of Ocean and Earth Science and Technology (SOEST) received the largest amount of extramural funding among the Mānoa units at $92 million. SOEST was followed by the medical school at $57 million, the College of Natural Sciences and the University of Hawaiʻi Cancer Center at $24 million, the Institute for Astronomy at $22 million, CTAHR at $18 million, and the College of Social Sciences and the College of Education at $16 million.

Across the UH system, the majority of research funding comes from the Department of Health and Human Services, the Department of Defense, the Department of Education, the National Science Foundation, the Department of Commerce, and the National Aeronautics Space Administration (NASA). Local funding comes from Hawaii government agencies, non-profit organizations, health organizations and business and other interests.

The $150-million medical complex in Kakaʻako opened in the spring of 2005. The facility houses a biomedical research and education center that attracts significant federal funding and private sector investment in biotechnology and cancer research and development.

Research (broadly conceived) is expected of every faculty member at UH Mānoa. Also, according to the Carnegie Foundation, UH Mānoa is an RU/VH (very high research activity) level research university.

In 2013, UH Mānoa was elected to membership in the Association of Pacific Rim Universities, the leading consortium of research universities for the region. APRU represents 45 premier research universities—with a collective 2 million students and 120,000 faculty members—from 16 economies.

=== University of Hawaiʻi Cancer Center ===
The University of Hawaiʻi Cancer Center is part of the Hawaiʻi at Mānoa. Its facility in Kakaʻako was completed in 2013. It is designated as cancer center by the National Cancer Institute and represents Hawaiʻi and the Pacific. It was founded in 1971 and was named the Cancer Research Center of Hawaiʻi before 2011. As of December 2022, Naoto Ueno is the center's director.

== Demographics ==
Undergraduate demographics as of Fall 2023
Race and ethnicity	Total
Asian	33%
Two or more races	25%
White	21%
Hispanic	14%
International student	3%
Black	2%
Native Hawaiian/Pacific Islander	2%
Unknown	1%
Economic diversity
Low-income (Note: The percentage of students who received an income-based federal Pell grant intended for low-income students.)	25%
Affluent (Note: The percentage of students who are a part of the American middle class at the bare minimum.)	75%

UH is the fourth most diverse university in the U.S. According to the 2010 report of the Institutional Research Office, a plurality of students at the University of Hawaiʻi at Mānoa are Caucasian, making up a quarter of the student body. The next largest groups were Japanese Americans (13%), native or part native Hawaiians (13%), Filipino Americans (8%), Chinese Americans (7%) and mixed race (12%). Pacific Islanders and other ethnic groups make up the balance (22%).

== Student life ==
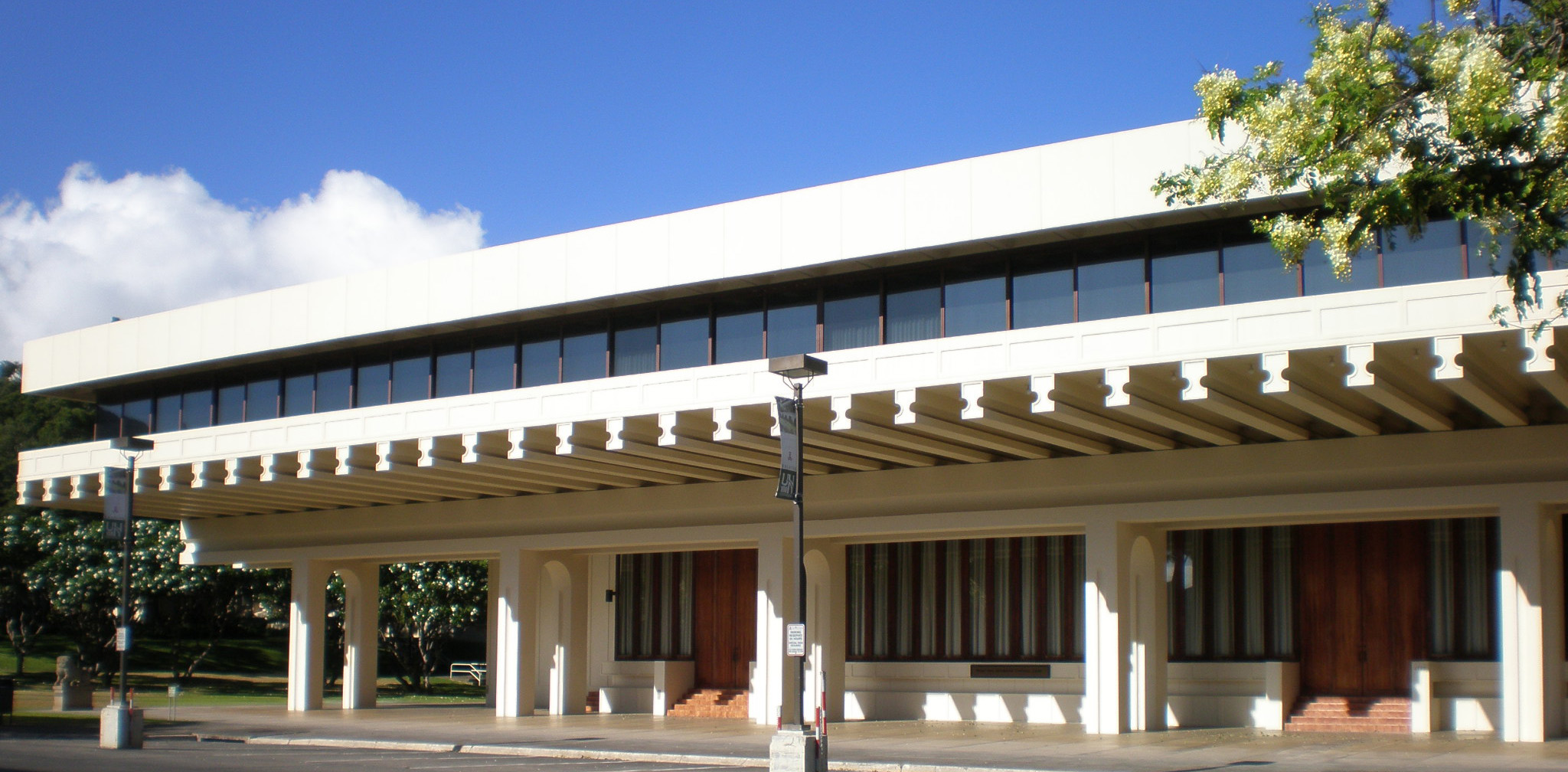
International Conference Center at Jefferson Hall

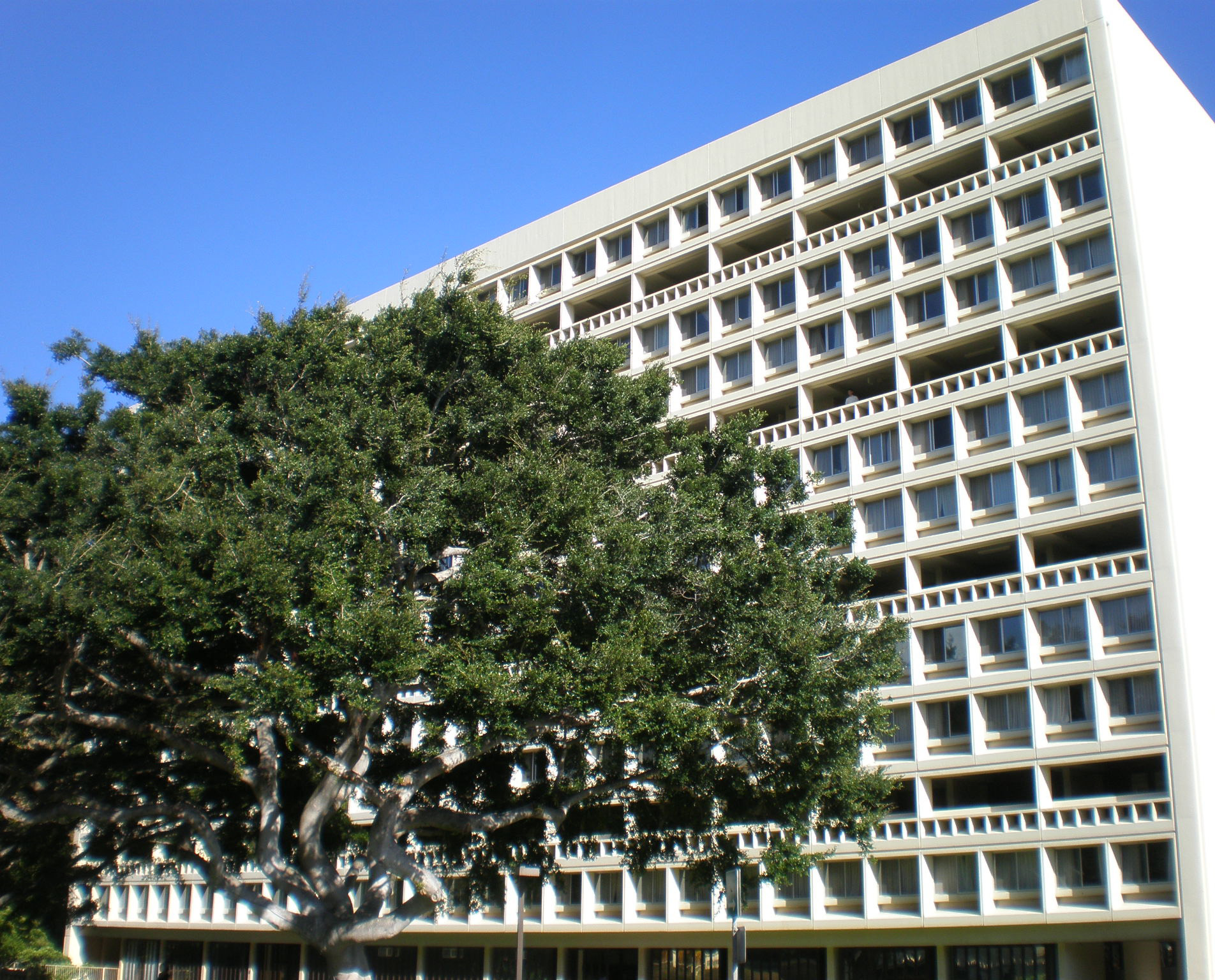
Hale Mānoa Dormitory, East-West Center designed by I. M. Pei

=== Student housing ===
All UH Mānoa residence halls are coeducational. These include the Hale Aloha Complex, Johnson Hall, Hale Laulima, and Hale Kahawai. Suite-style residence halls include Frear Hall and Gateway House. First-year undergraduates who choose to live on campus live in the traditional residence halls.

Two apartment-style complexes are Hale Noelani and Hale Wainani. Hale Noelani consists of five three-story buildings and Hale Wainani has two high rise buildings (one 14-story and one 13-story) and two low-rise buildings. Second-year undergraduates and above are permitted to live in Hale Noelani and Hale Wainani.

The university reserves some low-rise units for graduate students and families.

=== Charles H. Atherton YMCA ===
The University of Hawaiʻi at Mānoa and the YMCA of Honolulu has enjoyed a close and robust partnership since the university's founding. Beginning informally in 1908, the YMCA held bible classes and discussions at the University of Hawaiʻi, when it was the College of Hawaiʻi. In 1912, the YMCA of Honolulu followed the college to Mānoa valley and continued its work in Hawaiʻi Hall. In 1922, the relationship was formalized and it was one of the largest and most active groups on the university's campus, including hosting events for high school and incoming students.

In 1932, through funding by the Atherton family, the YMCA moved across the street to a three-story cement building on University Avenue. The building, called the Charles H. Atherton House or the "Pink Building", in addition to being the center for YMCA activities, also was student housing and dining hall. In 1995, the YMCA purchased the Mary Atherton House next door to provide additional residential and activity space.

In 2017, the Atherton building was sold to the university and University of Hawaiʻi Foundation. Today, its main offices are located in the Queen Lili'uokalani Center for Student Services building on the University of Hawaiʻi at Mānoa, where they continue serve UH students and families throughout Hawaiʻi.

The Atherton building has now been demolished, and new student housing and an innovation center have been constructed, funded through a public-private partnership.

=== Associated Students of the University of Hawaiʻi ===
The Associated Students of the University of Hawaiʻi at Manoa (ASUH) is the undergraduate student government representing the 10,000+ full-time, classified, undergraduate students at the University of Hawaiʻi at Mānoa. ASUH was founded in 1910 as the Associated Students of Hawaiʻi and was chartered by the University of Hawaiʻi Board of Regents in 1912.

== Off-campus ==
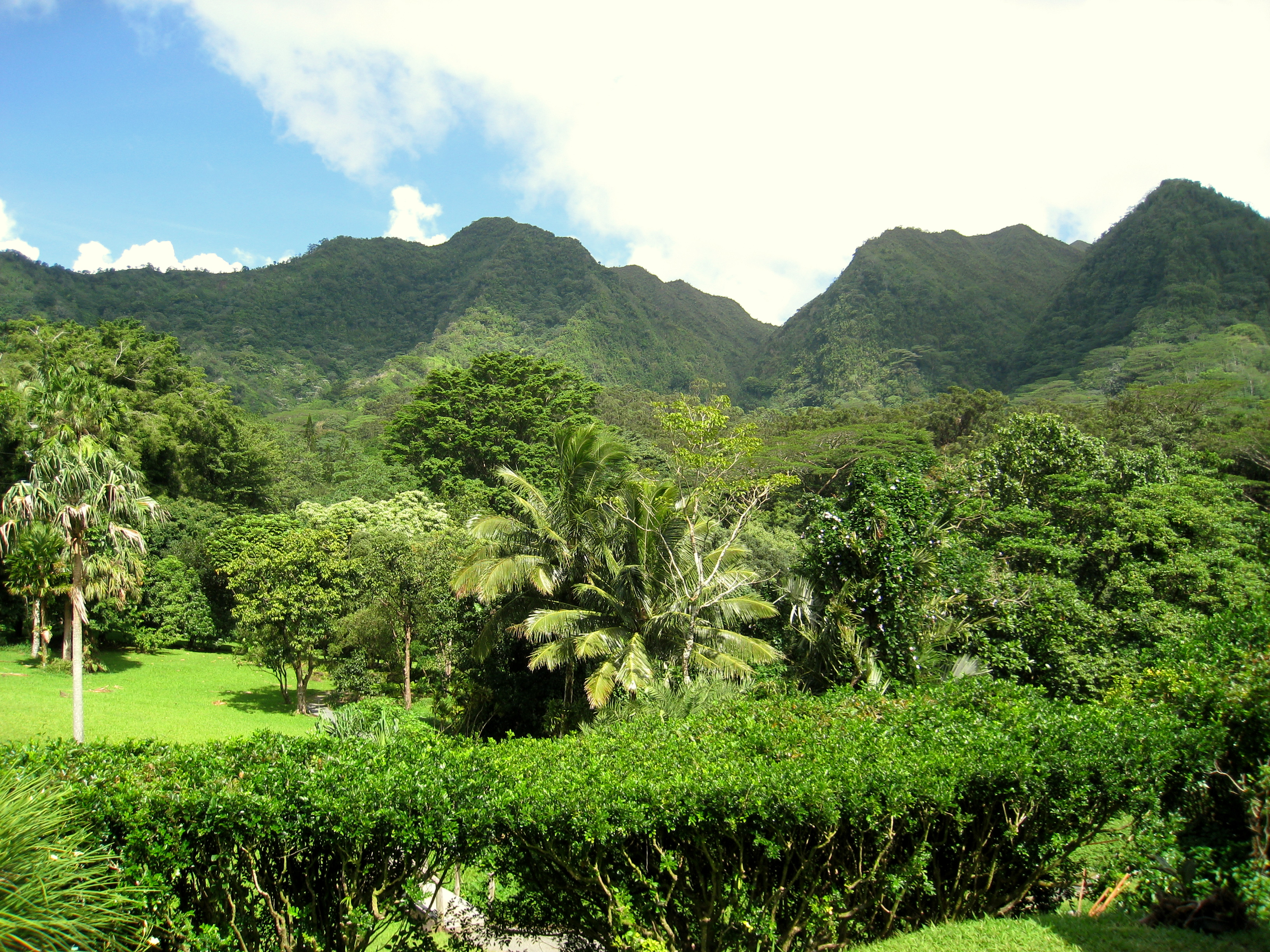
Lyon Arboretum

- The Lyon Arboretum is the only tropical arboretum belonging to any American university. The Arboretum, located in Mānoa Valley, was established in 1918 by the Hawaiian Sugar Planters' Association to demonstrate watershed restoration and test tree species for reforestation, as well as to collect living plants of economic value. In 1953, it became part of the University of Hawaiʻi at Mānoa. Its over 15,000 accessions focus primarily on the monocot families of palms, gingers, heliconias, bromeliads and aroids.
- The Waikiki Aquarium, founded in 1904, is the third-oldest public aquarium in the United States. A part of the University of Hawaiʻi since 1919, the Aquarium is located next to a living reef on the Waikiki shoreline.

== Athletics ==
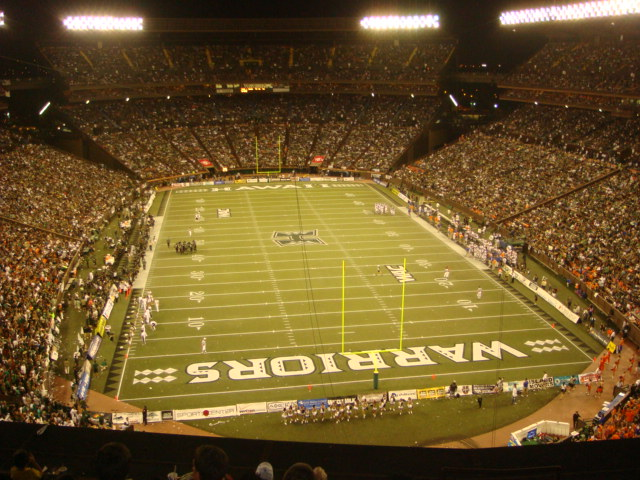
The off-campus Aloha Stadium, situated near Pearl Harbor in Honolulu, was the home of Rainbow Warrior Football from 1975 to 2020.

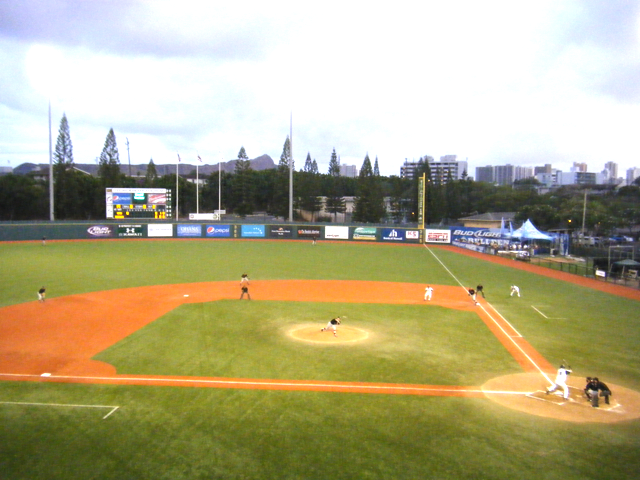
Les Murakami Baseball Field

The University of Hawaiʻi at Mānoa competes in NCAA Division I, the only Hawaii school to do so. It competes in the Mountain West Conference for football only and the Big West Conference for most other sports. UH competes in the Mountain Pacific Sports Federation in men's and women's swimming and diving, and indoor track and field while the coed and women's sailing teams are members of the Pacific Coast Collegiate Sailing Conference.

Men's teams are known as Rainbow Warriors, and women's teams are called Rainbow Wahine. "Wahine" means "woman" in Hawaiian. They are most notable for men's and women's basketball, volleyball, baseball, and football programs. The university won the 2004 Intercollegiate Sailing Association National Championships. The women's volleyball program won NCAA championships in 1982, 1983 and 1987. The men's volleyball won NCAA championships in 2021 and 2022. The men's volleyball team had previously won an NCAA championship title game in 2002, but the title was later vacated due to violations.

The principal sports venues are Clarence T. C. Ching Athletics Complex, Stan Sheriff Center, Les Murakami Stadium, Rainbow Wahine Softball Stadium, and the Duke Kahanamoku Aquatic Complex.

The university's athletic budget in FY 2008–2009 was $29.6 million.

== Notable alumni and faculty ==
Notable alumni of the University of Hawaiʻi at Mānoa include:

- Neil Abercrombie (M.A. 1964, PhD 1974), former governor of Hawaiʻi
- Daniel Akaka (B.A. 1952, M.Ed. 1966), U.S. senator
- Arsenio Balisacan, PhD, 1985, Socioeconomic Planning Secretary and Director General of the National Economic and Development Authority of the Philippines
- Alice Augusta Ball (M.S. Chemistry, 1915), chemist
- Robert Ballard (M.S. 1966), oceanographer
- Rick Blangiardi (M.A 1973), 15th mayor of Honolulu
- Robert Blust (B.A. 1967, PhD 1974), linguist and Austronesian language expert
- Tammy Duckworth (B.A. 1990), U.S. senator
- Ann Dunham (Ph.D. 1992), anthropologist and mother of President Barack Obama
- Georgia Engel (B.A. 1967), actress
- Alan M. Friedlander (PhD. 1996), marine biologist
- Sonny Ganaden (J.D. 2006), lawyer, journalist and member of the Hawaii House of Representatives from the 30th District; later a faculty member
- Colleen Hanabusa (B.A. 1970, M.A. 1975, J.D. 1977), former U.S. congresswoman
- Mazie Hirono (B.A. 1970), U.S. senator
- Ana Paula Höfling, dance researcher and academic
- Robert Huey, Japanologist
- Daniel Inouye (B.A. 1950), U.S. senator
- Ed Lu, postdoctoral fellow, former NASA astronaut
- Patsy Mink (B.A. 1948), former U.S. congresswoman
- Janet Mock (B.A. 2004), writer
- Esther T. Mookini, linguist and translator
- Robyn Ah Mow-Santos, 1996, USA Volleyball Team member and former Olympian
- Richard Parsons (B.A. 1968), businessman, former chairman of Citigroup
- Pat Saiki (B.S. 1952), former member of the U.S. House of Representatives and teacher
- Michael Savage (M.S., 1970, M.A., 1972), author
- Jay H. Shidler (B.B.A. 1968) entrepreneur and benefactor of the Shidler College of Business
- Linda Taira (B.A. 1978), former chief congressional correspondent for CNN
- Mark Takai (B.A. 1990, M.P.H. 1993), U.S. congressman
- Nainoa Thompson (B.A. 1986), navigator and former trustee of Kamehameha Schools
- Corinne K. A. Watanabe (J.D. 1971), judge

Notable faculty of the University of Hawaiʻi at Mānoa include:

- Lee Altenberg, theoretical biologist
- Mapuana Antonio, public health academic
- Tom Apple, physical chemist
- Kim Binsted, computer scientist
- Lyle Campbell, linguist
- Monique Chyba, mathematician
- David Cameron Duffy, conservation biologist
- Kathy Ferguson, political scientist
- David T. Ho, oceanographer
- Bruce Houghton, volcanologist
- Hope A. Ishii, geophysicist
- Reece Jones, geographer, Guggenheim Fellow
- Kenneth Y. Kaneshiro, evolutionary biologist
- David Karl, microbiologist and oceanographer, member of the National Academy of Sciences
- Patrick Vinton Kirch, archaeologist, member of the National Academy of Sciences
- Denise Konan, economist
- Michelle Manes, mathematician
- Karen Jean Meech, astronomer
- Manfred B. Steger, sociologist

Notable former faculty members include:

- Isabella Abbott, ethnobotanist
- Norman Abramson, electrical engineer and computer scientist
- Glenn Cannon, theatre
- Hampton L. Carson, evolutionary biologist
- Jim Dator, political-social science
- Wilbur Davenport, communications engineering, member of the National Academy of Engineering
- Edward DeLong, marine microbiologist, member of the National Academy of Sciences
- Milton Diamond, anatomist
- Mike Douglass, urban planner
- Ruth D. Gates, marine biologist
- Ruth Haas, mathematician
- Richard S. Hamilton, mathematician, member of the National Academy of Sciences
- George Herbig, astronomer, member of the National Academy of Sciences
- Klaus Keil, geophysicist
- Robert A. Kinzie III, biologist and zoologist
- Franklin F. Kuo, computer scientist
- John Madey, physicist
- Margaret McFall-Ngai, biologist, member of the National Academy of Sciences
- W. Wesley Peterson, computer scientist and mathematician
- Joseph Rock, botanist
- Harold St. John, botanist
- Shunzo Sakamaki, Japanese studies
- Richard Schmidt, linguist
- Michael J. Shapiro, political scientist
- Steven M. Stanley, paleontologist and evolutionary biologist, member of the National Academy of Sciences
- Lani Stemmermann, botanist, conservation biologist
- Stephen Vargo, marketing
- Bin Wang, meteorologist
- Satosi Watanabe, theoretical physicist
- Reina Whaitiri, English literature
- Ryuzo Yanagimachi, biologist, member of the National Academy of Sciences

== See also ==
- Hawaiʻi Institute of Marine Biology
- Hawaii Ocean Time-series (HOT)
- University of Hawaiʻi Marching Band
