= David Lassner =

American computer scientist

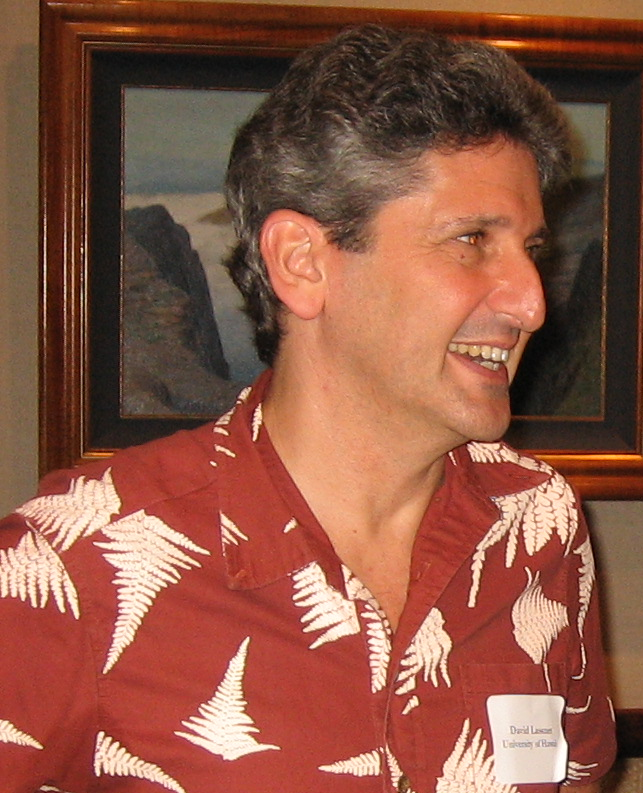
- Lassner in 2009

15th President of the University of Hawaiʻi System
- In office September 1, 2013 – December 2024
- Preceded by: Mary Greenwood
- Succeeded by: Wendy Hensel

Personal details
- Born: 1954 (age 71–72) Stamford, Connecticut, U.S.
- Education: University of Illinois Urbana-Champaign (BA, MS); University of Hawaiʻi at Mānoa (PhD)
- Scientific career
- Fields: Computer science
- Workplaces: University of Hawaiʻi
- Thesis: Global telecommunications standardization in transition: Impacts on Southeast Asia (1998)
- Doctoral advisor: Dan J. Wedemeyer

David Lassner (born 1954) is an American computer scientist and academic administrator. He served as the 15th president of the University of Hawaiʻi System, starting as interim president in September 2013, and full-time president from July 2014 to December 2024.

== Early life and education ==
Lassner was born in 1954 in Stamford, Connecticut, before his family moved to Rochester, New York, and Brockton, Massachusetts. By the time he reached middle school, his family settled in the south suburbs of Chicago until the end of high school. Following this, he graduated summa cum laude with his Bachelor of Arts degree in economics and master's degree in computer science from the University of Illinois Urbana-Champaign. During graduate school, Lassner was trained on the PLATO computer system and was soon recruited to work at the University of Hawaiʻi for one year. He completed graduate school while still in Hawaii and chose to remain there.

== Career ==
Lassner began his doctorate degree in communication and information sciences at the University of Hawaiʻi while working as a contractor. After three years of renewed contracts, he was given an entry-level staff position. He was a computer specialist until 1989 before being appointed the director of Information Technology. During this time, he was also actively involved in the Western Cooperative for Educational Telecommunication (WCET) and received their Richard W. Jonsen Award for Service to the Educational Telecommunications Community. In 1994, Lassner was charged with creating the information technology organization across the University of Hawaiʻi system. In 2004, Lassner was elected Chair of the WCET and chairman of the Internet2 Applications Strategy Council, where he also served on their board of trustees. While serving in these roles, he served as the principal investigator for Maui High Performance Computing Center and for the Pacific Disaster Center. He also led projects in collaboration with the Hawai‘i Education and Research Network through funding from the National Science Foundation. As a result of his academic efforts, he was also elected to the Board of Directors of EDUCAUSE for a four-year term.

Following the resignation of President M. R. C. Greenwood, Lassner was approached by the board of regents to assume the position. He was formally elected to his first full term in 2014 with a vote of 11 to 2 with 2 abstentions. In his first year as president, Lassner was invited by United States President Barack Obama to attend the White House College Opportunity Summit. He was the 2018 recipient of the Christine Haska Distinguished Service Award from the Corporation for Education Network Initiatives in California. In July 2019, the Department of Land and Natural Resources reported at least 33 kupuna were arrested by police on Mauna Kea. As a result of the arrests, members of the UH faculty and staff from various departments asked him to halt the Thirty Meter Telescope construction and faculty from the Kamakakuokalani Center for Hawaiian Studies called for his resignation. Following this, Lassner said he's "struggling with how the project is dividing the university and broader community" and called it "the greatest challenge he's faced as UH president."

During the COVID-19 pandemic, Lassner established a "blue ribbon" committee to provide strategic vision and advice for the future of UH Mānoa athletics. He also encouraged the partnership between the John A. Burns School of Medicine and the City and County of Honolulu to create a lab at the medical school for COVID-19 research and testing.
