= Shidler College of Business =

Business school of the University of Hawaii

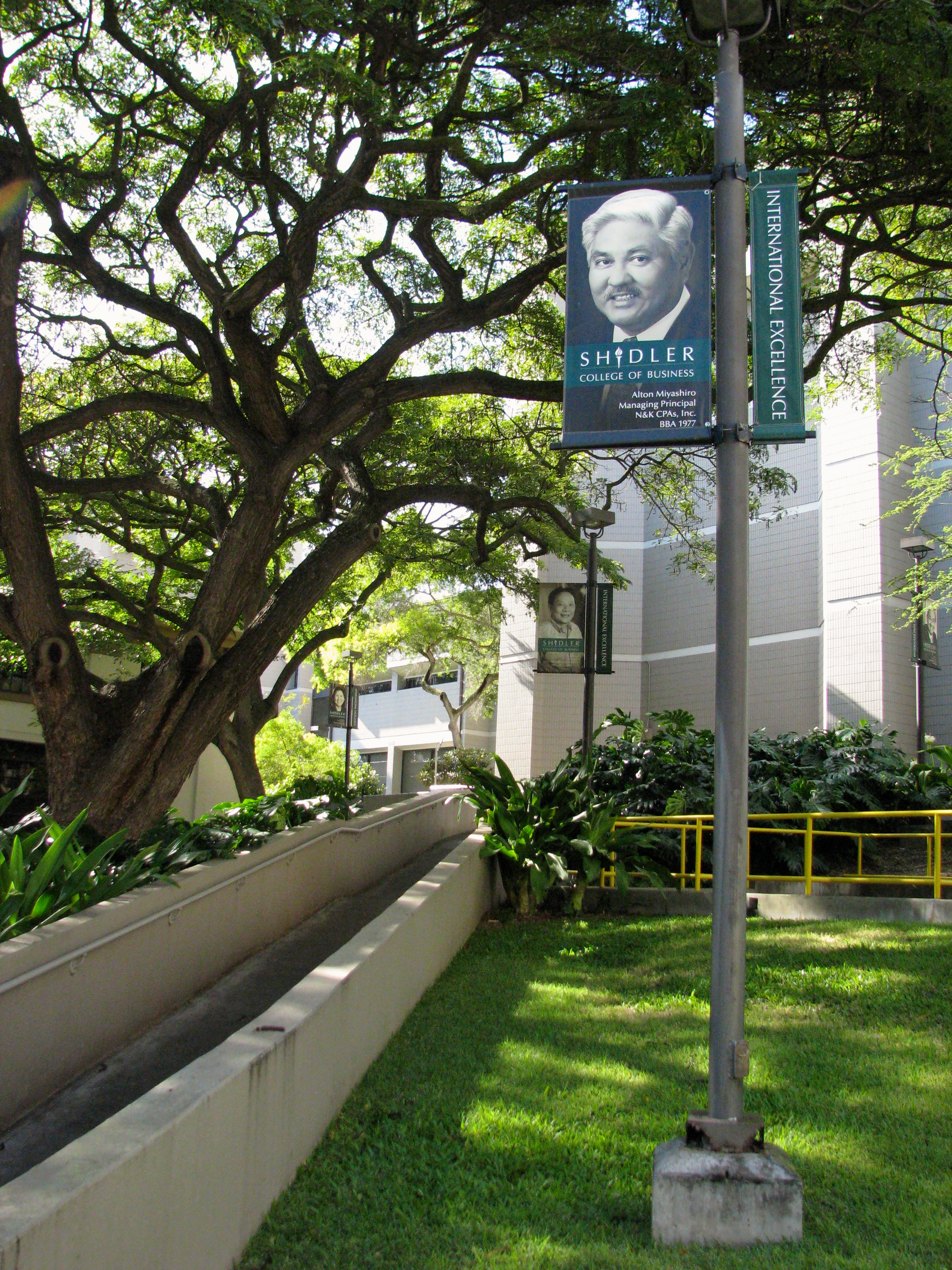
- The Shidler buildings in 2013
- Motto: International Excellence
- Parent school: University of Hawaiʻi at Mānoa
- Established: 1949; 77 years ago
- School type: Public
- Dean: V. Vance Roley
- Location: Honolulu, Hawaii, USA; 21°18′2.7534″N 157°49′11.229″W
- Enrollment: 1,474 (2015)
- Faculty: 65
- Website: shidler.hawaii.edu

The Shidler College of Business is the business school of the University of Hawaiʻi at Mānoa in Honolulu, Hawaii, United States. It is the state's only public business school with graduate, executive, and PhD programs. Established in 1949, the school was renamed after Jay H. Shidler in 2006 following a US$25 million donation.

The business school is accredited by the Association to Advance Collegiate Schools of Business (AACSB), and offers a Bachelor of Business Administration (BBA), a Master of Business Administration (MBA) (Full-time and Part-Time), a Master of Accounting, a Master of Human Resource Management, an Executive Master of Business Administration (EMBA), and a Doctor of Philosophy in Business Administration (PhD). Through partnerships with international universities, Shidler also offers a Global Master of Business Administration (MBA) with tracks in China, Japan and Vietnam, a Vietnam Executive Master of Business Administration (VEMBA). Shidler also offers a Graduate Certificate in Entrepreneurship.

== History ==
In 1949 the University of Hawai‘i at Manoa College of Business Administration opened in Hawaiʻi Hall to teach accounting, economics, and industrial relations.

In 1967 the College received national accreditation from Association to Advance Collegiate Schools of Business (AACSB).

There were 1,300 students enrolled in the mid-60's. In 1969 the United States Department of Health, Education and Welfare provided a grant for the construction of a new building. In the fall of 1971 the College moved into its new facility.

In 2006, the University of Hawaii Board of Regents voted to accept a US$25 million donation from alumnus and founder of The Shidler Group, Jay H. Shidler, naming the College after him as the Shidler College of Business. In 2014, Shidler raised his donation to US$100 million, making it the largest donation to the University of Hawaii from a private donor.

== Academics ==
=== Undergraduate Degrees ===
==== Bachelor of Business Administration ====
Shidler offers a Bachelor of Business Administration (BBA) with majors available in:

- Accounting
- Entrepreneurship
- Finance
- Human Resource Management
- International Business
- Management
- Management Information Systems
- Marketing
- Travel Industry Management

The Shidler College also offers a Freshman Direct Admit Program (DAP) for high achieving high school seniors who plan to major in business.

=== Graduate Degrees ===
Shidler offers the following graduate degrees:

==== Master of Business Administration ====
Shidler offers the following Master of Business Administration (MBA) programs:

- Global MBA
  - Global MBA with China Track
  - Global MBA with Japan Track
- Part-time MBA
- Executive MBA
  - Distance Learning Executive MBA
  - Vietnam Executive MBA

==== Master of Accounting ====
Shidler offers a Master of Accounting.

==== Master of Human Resource Management ====
Shidler offers a Master of Human Resource Management.

==== Master of Travel Industry Management ====
Shidler offers a Master of Travel Industry Management.

==== Doctor of Philosophy in Business Administration ====
Shidler offers a Doctor of Philosophy in Business Administration.

==== Graduate certificates ====
Shidler offers the following Graduate Certificates:

- Graduate Certificate in Entrepreneurship

== Institutes ==
- The Pacific-Asian Center for Entrepreneurship (PACE)
- Pacific-Asian Management Institute (PAMI)
- Pacific Research Institute for Information Systems and Management (PRIISM)

== Research centers ==
- Center for International Business Education and Research (CIBER)
- Pacific Asian Consortium for International Business Education and Research (PACIBER)
- Hawaii International Conference on System Sciences] (HICSS)
- Family Business Center of Hawaii
