= Willard Johnson (political scientist) =

American political scientist (1935–2023)

- Born: November 22, 1935; St. Louis, Missouri, U.S.
- Died: October 29, 2023 (aged 87)
- Education: University of California at Los Angeles; Johns Hopkins University; Harvard University
- Scientific career
- Fields: Political science
- Workplaces: Massachusetts Institute of Technology

Willard R. Johnson (November 22, 1935 – October 29, 2023) was an American political scientist and African studies expert. He was a professor emeritus of political science at the Massachusetts Institute of Technology. Johnson studied the development of political institutions and international relations, with a particular focus on Cameroon and other African countries. He was also an activist on issues relating to African politics, for example United States Government disinvestment from South Africa during Apartheid.

Johnson died on October 29, 2023, at the age of 87.

== Education and early work ==
Johnson was born in St. Louis, Missouri, on November 22, 1935. His father was a United States Public Health Service bacteriologist. His family moved first to Tuskegee, Alabama, and then to Pasadena, California in 1946, where Johnson attended John Muir High School.

Johnson studied international relations at the University of California at Los Angeles, where he graduated with a BA degree in 1957. While a student at UCLA, Johnson became the president of the student body, which then contained 12,000 students. He was also a founding member of a chapter of the NAACP there, and was involved in bringing distinguished speakers to invite at campus, including W. E. B. DuBois. In 1961 Johnson completed an MA at the Johns Hopkins University School of Advanced International Studies, later called the Paul H. Nitze School of Advanced International Studies, and in 1965 he obtained a PhD from Harvard University. Johnson's PhD dissertation was entitled Cameroon Reunification: The Political Union of Several Africas. He studied the recent unification of Cameroon, concluding that the unification of the state preceded coherent political integration and was only partly a reflection of the desires of the populace.

== Career ==
Johnson joined the political science faculty at the Massachusetts Institute of Technology in 1964. In 1969 he was promoted from assistant professor to associate professor. From 1968 to 1970, Johnson took a leave to serve as executive director of the Roxbury, Boston community development corporation The Circle Inc. He also held visiting positions at Harvard Business School, Boston University, and The Fletcher School of Law and Diplomacy.

In 1970, Johnson published the book The Cameroon Federation: Political Integration in a Fragmentary Society, the basis of which was his PhD dissertation. The Cameroon Federation was reviewed as being one of the first published accounts of the political system of Cameroon that was more than a brief historical treatment. This system was of particular interest because Cameroon was an officially bilingual nation with both French and British colonial histories, and the country had recently voted to unify after 40 years of administrative and cultural division. Johnson argued that Cameroon's success in forging one coherent state could serve as a case study that generalized to inter-African relations, since the continent too had the potential for sharp divisions between regions with French colonial history and regions with British colonial history. In a review of The Cameroon Federation, Claude E. Welch summarized the resulting political situation as "one of the oddest federations on the contemporary political map", which "exhibits all the usual splinterings of tropical African states". In The Cameroon Federation Johnson studied the extent to which the different parts of Cameroon had become truly politically integrated, and not just superficially joined, concluding that the development of substantial state capacity in a unified Cameroon was not certain.

During the 1960s and 1970s, Johnson was a member of the Africa Policy Task Force for the George McGovern 1972 presidential campaign and the Foreign Affairs Study Group of the Democratic Party Advisory Council, as well as UNESCO's U.S. National Committee. He was also a founder of the Boston Pan-African Forum.

During the 1980s, Johnson was involved in local activism to promote divestment from South Africa. As president of the TransAfrica Boston Support Group in 1982, he has been credited with playing an important role in the passage of divestment legislation by the Massachusetts House of Representatives, overriding a veto by Governor Edward J. King.

For the remainder of his academic career Johnson continued to study institutional development and international relations, with a particular focus on Africa.
