= Wendy Hensel =

American legal scholar and academic administrator

16th President of University of Hawaiʻi
- Incumbent
- Assumed office January 2025
- Preceded by: David Lassner

Personal details
- Education: Michigan State University; Harvard University

Wendy F. Hensel is an American legal scholar, academic administrator, and educator currently serving as the president of the University of Hawaiʻi. She has previously held leadership roles in higher education, including positions at Georgia State University and as executive vice chancellor and university provost at the City University of New York (CUNY).

== Early life and education ==
Wendy F. Hensel earned a B.A. in American Public Affairs with honors from Michigan State University in 1992. She was recognized as a Harry S. Truman Scholar in 1991 and was named one of the Top Ten College Women in the United States in the areas of politics and national affairs by Conde Nast the same year. She completed a J.D. cum laude at Harvard Law School in 1995.

== Career ==
Hensel clerked for judge Orinda Dale Evans at the U.S. District Court for the Northern District of Georgia from August 1995 to July 1996. She worked as an associate at Alston & Bird in Atlanta, Georgia, specializing in labor and employment law, from August 1996 to May 1999. She transitioned to academia in 1999, joining the Georgia State University (GSU) College of Law as an instructor, a role she held until 2002. She became an assistant professor in August 2003, an associate professor in August 2006, and a full professor in August 2011.

From May 2012 to June 2017, Hensel served as Associate Dean for Research and Faculty Development at GSU. During this period, her academic work focused on disability law, education law, and employment discrimination, with research addressing mental illness stigma in legal outcomes, IDEA eligibility, and the allocation of medical resources for individuals with disabilities during public health emergencies.

In July 2017, Hensel was appointed interim dean of the GSU College of Law, and in October 2017, she became the permanent dean. As dean, she launched programs integrating legal education with data analytics and implemented measures to improve bar passage rates using evidence-based practices. In July 2019, she became Interim Provost and was named Provost and Senior Vice President for Academic Affairs at GSU in October 2019, a position she held until December 31, 2021. During her tenure, she led the university’s academic response to the COVID-19 pandemic in Georgia, including transitioning nearly 11,000 courses online in early 2020.

In June 2022, Hensel joined the City University of New York (CUNY) as Executive Vice Chancellor and University Provost. At CUNY, she developed strategic initiatives to expand online education, enhance student success, and implement a system-wide transfer plan to facilitate student transitions between institutions. In October 2024, she was selected as the next president of the University of Hawaiʻi. The position includes oversight of the 10-campus system, with a provision for a fallback academic appointment at the William S. Richardson School of Law.
