= List of Eta Kappa Nu members =

Eta Kappa Nu is the international honor society of the Institute of Electrical and Electronics Engineers (IEEE). It was established in 1904 at the University of Illinois. The following is a list of Eta Kappa Nu members.

Eminent Members are identified with an asterisk. The Eminent Member category is reserved for "those individuals who, by their technical attainments and contributions to society, have shown themselves to be outstanding leaders in an IEEE-designed field of interest, and great benefactors to society."

== Academia ==
=== Presidents ===
- Steven Sample* – president of the University of Southern California and the University of Buffalo
- William E. Wickenden – president of Case School of Applied Science, now Case Western Reserve University and assistant vice president of the American Telephone and Telegraph Company

=== Deans ===
- Joseph Bordogna* – director of the Moore School of Electrical Engineering, dean of the School of Engineering and Applied Science at University of Pennsylvania, deputy director and chief operating officer of National Science Foundation
- William Littell Everitt – professor, dean, and head of department at the University of Illinois at Urbana-Champaign
- Moshe Kam – professor and dean of the Newark College of Engineering at the New Jersey Institute of Technology

=== Professors ===
- Massoud Amin – professor of Electrical and Computer Engineering at the University of Minnesota
- Michael Athans – control theorist and professor emeritus in the Department of Electrical Engineering and Computer Science at the Massachusetts Institute of Technology
- James R. Biard – professor of electrical engineering at Texas A&M University
- Richard Baraniuk – professor of Electrical and Computer Engineering at Rice University; founder and director of OpenStax
- David K. Cheng – professor with the Department of Electrical Engineering of Syracuse University
- Rory A. Cooper – professor and chair of the Department of Rehabilitation Science and Technology and professor of bioengineering, physical medicine and rehabilitation, and orthopedic surgery at the University of Pittsburgh
- Thomas H. Cormen – emeritus professor of computer science and former chairman of the Dartmouth College Department of Computer Science
- Charles Dalziel – professor of electrical engineering and computer sciences at the University of California, Berkeley
- Ashutosh Dutta – senior scientist at Johns Hopkins University Applied Physics Lab and adjunct faculty at Johns Hopkins University
- Bruce Eisenstein – professor, interim dean, and vice dean of the College of Engineering at Drexel University
- Leila De Floriani – computer scientist and a professor at the University of Maryland at College Park and University of Genova
- Jay Wright Forrester – computer engineer, management theorist, and professor at Massachusetts Institute of Technology
- Susan L. Graham* – professor at the University of California, Berkeley
- Violet B. Haas – applied mathematician and professor of electrical engineering at Purdue University College of Engineering
- Ernest Lenard Hall – professor emeritus of mechanical engineering and computer science in the School of Dynamic Systems in the College of Engineering and Applied Science at the University of Cincinnati
- Jeffrey Heer – professor at the University of Washington
- Nadia Heninger – professor at the University of California, San Diego
- Frederick Vinton Hunt – professor at Harvard University who worked in the field of acoustic engineering
- J. David Irwin – Earle C. Williams Eminent Scholar and former Electrical and Computer Engineering Department head at Auburn University
- Leah H. Jamieson* – professor at Purdue University
- Mona Jarrahi – professor at the University of California, Los Angeles
- Vladimir Karapetoff – professor at Cornell University
- Leonard Kleinrock* – professor at University of California, Los Angeles and recipient of the National Medal of Science
- James Landay – professor at Stanford
- Wilbur R. LePage – professor and department chair of electrical and computer engineering at Syracuse University
- James D. Meindl* – professor of microelectronics at the Georgia Institute of Technology
- Mahta Moghaddam – professor of electrical engineering at the University of Southern California Viterbi School of Engineering
- Vincent Poor* – professor at Princeton University
- Eberhardt Rechtin* – director of the Advanced Research Projects Agency and professor at the University of Southern California
- Amit Sahai – professor at UCLA
- Floyd Van Nest Schultz – professor of electrical engineering at the University of Tennessee and Purdue University
- Mischa Schwartz – professor emeritus of Electrical Engineering at Columbia University
- Mohammad Shahidehpour – chairman in the Electrical and Computer Engineering Department at Illinois Institute of Technology
- Otto J. M. Smith – professor at University of California, Berkeley
- Royal Wasson Sorensen* – inventor of the vacuum switch, professor of electrical engineering and head of the electrical engineering department at California Institute of Technology
- Harold Webb – physicist and professor of electrical engineering at the University of Illinois, Urbana-Champaign
- Richard B. Wells* – professor emeritus at University of Idaho
- Wen-mei Hwu – professor in electrical and computer engineering in the Coordinated Science Laboratory at the University of Illinois at Urbana-Champaign
- Everard Mott Williams – head of Carnegie Mellon University Department of Electrical Engineering
- Jerry Woodall* – professor of electrical and computer engineering at the University of California, Davis, known for his work on LEDs and semiconductors
- William A. Wulf* – professor at the University of Virginia
- Ronald R. Yager – director of the Machine Intelligence Institute and professor of information systems at Iona College
- John Zaborszky – professor in the Department of systems science and mathematics, Washington University in St. Louis
- Charles Zukowski – professor and former chair of the Department of Electrical Engineering at Columbia University

== Aerospace ==
- Gregory Chamitoff – NASA astronaut
- Owen K. Garriott* – NASA astronaut
- José M. Hernández – NASA astronaut
- William B. Lenoir – electrical engineer and NASA astronaut
- Sandra Magnus – NASA astronaut and executive director of American Institute of Aeronautics and Astronautics
- Carl J. Meade – NASA astronaut
- Judith Resnik – NASA astronaut who died in the Space Shuttle Challenger disaster
- Stanley F. Schmidt – aerospace engineer who pioneered the Schmidt-Kalman filter used in air and space navigation, most notably in Apollo spacecraft
- Ronald M. Sega – NASA astronaut
- David Wolf – NASA astronaut

== Business ==
- Robert J. Abernethy – founder and president of American Standard Development Company and Self Storage Management Company
- Norman R. Augustine* – former chairman and CEO of the Lockheed Martin Corporation, chairman of the Review of United States Human Space Flight Plans Committee
- Henry Bachman* – former vice-president of BAE Systems and 1987 president of IEEE
- Walter Ransom Gail Baker – vice president of General Electric and director of engineering for the Radio Manufacturers Association
- Constantine A. Balanis – professor at Arizona State University
- Mary Barra – CEO of General Motors
- Gordon Bell* – engineer and former manager at Digital Equipment Corporation
- Amar Bose* – inventor, founder, and former chairman of Bose
- Dennis C. Bottorff – chairman and CEO of the First American Corporation, co-founder of Council Capital, and co-founder and the chairman of CapStar Bank.
- Francis deSouza – CEO and president of Illumina
- George H. Heilmeier* – vice president and chief technical officer at Texas Instruments, director of the Defense Advanced Research Projects Agency, engineer at RCA Laboratories and United States Department of Defense, pioneering contributor to liquid crystal displays
- Lester Hogan* – CEO and chairman of Fairchild Camera & Instrument, pioneer in microwave and semiconductor technology
- Edwin J. Houston – co-founder of Thomson-Houston Electric Company, author, novelist, and college professor
- Irwin M. Jacobs* – co-founder of Qualcomm
- Paul Jacobs – former executive chairman of Qualcomm
- Ray O. Johnson – chief executive officer of Technology Innovation Institute and chief technology officer of Lockheed Martin
- Mervin Kelly – director of research, president, and chairman of the board of directors of Bell Labs
- Bernard J. Lechner – vice president, RCA Laboratories
- Seah Moon Ming – chairman of SMRT Corporation Ltd
- Ulrich L. Rohde – partner of Rohde & Schwarz and college professor
- Alexander N. Rossolimo – corporate financial analyst and chairman of the Center for Security and Social Progress
- Henry Samueli – founder and CEO of Broadcom
- Walter Jeremiah Sanders* – co-founder and former CEO of Advanced Micro Devices
- Elihu Thomson – co-founder of Thomson-Houston Electric Company
- Gary L. Tooker – CEO of Motorola
- Andrew Viterbi* – co-founder of Qualcomm Inc. and recipient of the National Medal of Science

== Computer science ==
- Sabeer Bhatia – founder of Hotmail
- Stephen Brobst – chief technology officer for Teradata and member of the United States President's Council of Advisors on Science and Technology
- Vint Cerf* – Internet pioneer, one of "the fathers of the Internet"
- David Filo – founder of Yahoo!
- George H. Goble – staff member at the Purdue University Engineering Computer Network and a 1996 Ig Nobel Prize winner
- Marcian Hoff* – one of the inventors of the microprocessor
- Ray Kurzweil* – inventor, author, and Google engineer
- Gordon E. Moore* – co-founder and former chairman of Intel
- Larry Page – founder and former CEO of Google
- Vincenzo Piuri – scientist who works in the field of information processing, with focus on artificial intelligence, computational intelligence, signal/image processing, biometrics, and fault-tolerant architectures
- Eric Schmidt – former executive chairman of Google
- W. David Sincoskie – installed the first Ethernet local area network at Bellcore, and helped invent voice over IP technology
- Wayne Stevens – chief architect of application development methodology for IBM's consulting group
- Steve Wallach – co-founder of Convex Computer
- Steve Wozniak* – co-founder of Apple Inc.

== Electrical engineering ==
- Walter R. G. Baker* – radio and television engineer and executive
- Nathan Cohn – electrical engineer known for his work in the development of automatic control techniques for interconnected electric power systems
- Martin Cooper* – pioneer in the wireless communications industry, especially in radio spectrum management
- John J. Deely – majored in electrical engineering; later professor of statistics
- Tomas Dy-Liacco – electrical engineer, researcher, and developer often referred to as the father of modern energy control centers
- Jewell James Ebers – electrical engineer at Bell Labs, remembered for the mathematical model of the bipolar junction transistor
- Richard D. Gitlin – electrical engineer, inventor, and research executive at Bell Labs
- Bernard M. Gordon* – "father of high-speed analog-to-digital conversion"
- Grace Hopper* – inventor of first compiler tools and Navy flag officer
- Mervin J. Kelly* – president of Bell Laboratories
- Jack Kilby* – inventor and engineer at Texas Instruments, recipient of the Nobel Prize in Physics and the National Medal of Science
- Tsuneo Nakahara* – engineer at Sumitomo Electric
- Thomas F. Quatieri – electrical engineer and senior technical staff member at the MIT Lincoln Laboratory
- Daniel R. von Recklinghausen – chief research engineer at MIT, engineer with Fairchild Semiconductor
- Jesse Russell – inventor who pioneered the field of digital cellular communication
- E. Fred Schubert – electrical engineer and researcher at Bell Laboratories and founding director of the Smart Lighting Engineering Research Center
- Louis Smullin – electrical engineer with the MIT Radiation Laboratory who was instrumental in creating the Lincoln Laboratory
- Ernst Weber – pioneer in microwave technologies, founder of the Weber Research Institute, first president of the IEEE, and the founder of the National Academy of Engineering
- Melvin M. Weiner – founder-chairman of the Motor Vehicle Safety Group, contributing to the establishment of the National Highway Traffic Safety Administration

== Entertainment ==
- John M. Eargle – Academy Award- and Grammy Award-winning audio engineer and musician

== Government ==
- Joseph Bordogna* – deputy director and chief operating officer of the National Science Foundation; director of the Moore School of Electrical Engineering, and dean of the School of Engineering and Applied Science at University of Pennsylvania
- Stephen Brobst – member of the United States President's Council of Advisors on Science and Technology and chief technology officer for Teradata
- Gordon R. England – U.S. deputy secretary of defense and twice served as the U.S. secretary of the Navy
- George H. Heilmeier* – director of the Defense Advanced Research Projects Agency, vice president and chief technical officer at Texas Instruments; engineer at RCA Laboratories and United States Department of Defense, pioneering contributor to liquid crystal displays
- John Ofori-Tenkorang – director general of the Social Security and National Insurance Trust in Ghana

== Literature ==
- Edwin J. Houston – author, novelist, college professor, and co-founder of Thomson-Houston Electric Company

== Science and medicine ==
- Michael L. Brodman – gynecologist and obstetrician, professor and chairman of the Department of Obstetrics, Gynecology and Reproductive Science at Mount Sinai Hospital, Mount Sinai Health System
- William E. Moerner – chemical physicist who won the Nobel Prize in Chemistry in 2014
- Edward Weston – chemist and engineer noted for his achievements in electroplating and his development of the electrochemical cell

== Sports ==
- David Clark – rower who won the silver medal with the U.S. team in the men's coxless four at the 1984 Summer Olympics
