= First Midwest Bancorp =

Publicly Traded American Bank

Coordinates: 41.990097°N 88.017208°W

First Midwest Bancorp, Inc.
- Type: Public
- Traded as: Nasdaq: FMBI
- Industry: Commercial banking Financial services
- Founded: 1982; 44 years ago Illinois, U.S.
- Defunct: 2022
- Fate: Acquired by Old National Bank
- Headquarters: 8750 W. Bryn Mawr, Suite 1300; Chicago, Illinois, U.S.
- Number of locations: More than 125 branches at 2017-12-31
- Area served: Chicago metropolitan area Illinois, Indiana, Iowa, Wisconsin
- Key people: Robert O'Meara (chairman); Mike Scudder (CEO); Paul Clemens (CFO)
- Products: Consumer Banking, Corporate Banking, Insurance, Investment Banking, Mortgage loans, Private Banking, Private Equity, Wealth Management, Credit Cards, Financial Analysis
- Net income: $107.9 million (2020) ▼46.0% from 2019
- Total assets: $21.5 billion at 2021-06-30
- Total equity: $2.69 billion at 2020-12-31 ▲13.5% from 2019
- Number of employees: 2,074 FTE (2020-12-31)
- Subsidiaries: First Midwest Bank
- Website: Archived official website at the Wayback Machine (archive index)

First Midwest Bancorp, Inc. was headquartered in Chicago, Illinois, just east of O'Hare Airport. The company's predecessor traces back to Joliet, Illinois. From there the company grew to serve many Chicago suburbs including northwest Indiana, downstate Illinois, southeast Wisconsin and the Quad Cities area including Iowa.

First Midwest Bank provided retail and business banking through more than 125 branches. In 2006, First Midwest acquired Bank Calumet for $307 million in cash, expanding its presence in the northwest Indiana area.

On October 23, 2009, First Midwest Bank acquired certain deposits and loans of Westmont-based First DuPage Bank in a transaction facilitated by the Federal Deposit Insurance Corporation. First DuPage had total assets of $279 million and deposits of about $254 million as of July 31, 2009. First Midwest Bank paid the FDIC a premium of 0.75 percent to assume all of the deposits, agreed to purchase essentially all of the assets, and entered into a loss-share transaction with the FDIC on about $247 million of them.

On April 23, 2010, First Midwest Bank acquired Peotone Bank, taking on $130 million in assets and $127 million in deposits in a transaction facilitated by the Federal Deposit Insurance Corporation.

On August 13, 2010, First Midwest acquired Palos Bank and Trust Company in a transaction facilitated by the Federal Deposit Insurance Corporation. Palos Bank and Trust Company had approximately $493.4 million in total assets and $467.8 million in total deposits, as of June 30, 2010. First Midwest Bank will pay the FDIC a premium of 1.0 percent to assume all of the deposits of Palos Bank and Trust Company. In addition to assuming all of the deposits of the failed bank, First Midwest Bank agreed to purchase essentially all of the assets. The FDIC and First Midwest Bank entered into a loss-share transaction on $343.8 million of Palos Bank and Trust Company's assets.

First Midwest Bank assumed Waukegan Savings Bank's $77 million in deposits and $89 million in assets following its closure by the FDIC.

The company acquired naming rights to the First Midwest Bank Amphitheatre in Tinley Park, Illinois.

In 2021, First Midwest announced a merger with Old National Bank, combining the companies assets, retaining the Old National name and maintaining headquarters in Chicago and Evansville. The merger was completed in February 2022.
