= E. Fred Schubert =

American electrical engineer

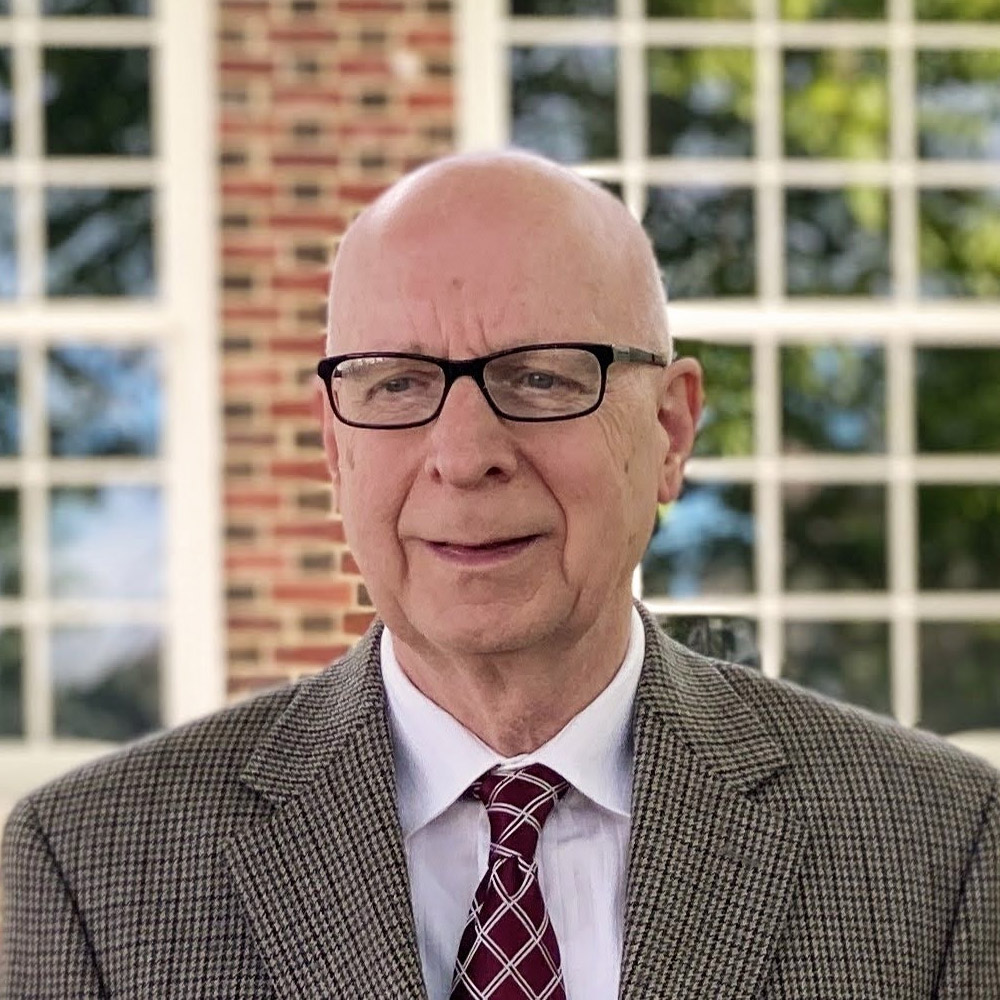
- Schubert in 2023
- Born: February 8, 1956 (age 70); Stuttgart, Germany
- Education: University of Stuttgart
- Known for: Technical contributions to LEDs and semiconductor technology
- Scientific career
- Fields: Microelectronics
- Workplaces: MPI FKF; Bell Labs; BU; RPI
- Doctoral advisor: Klaus H. Ploog

Eric Fred Schubert. is an electrical engineer, researcher, educator, and inventor (born on February 8, 1956, in Stuttgart, Germany) who made technical contributions to semiconductor devices, particularly LEDs. He has authored four books (including a standard textbook on LEDs), 39 U.S. patents, and more than 300 technical papers.

== Life and professional career ==
Schubert was born as the fifth child of Physicist Konrad Schubert and homemaker Martha Ruth (Reichert) Schubert. In his youth, Schubert developed an interest in electrical circuits and built various transistor circuits such as flip-flop circuits. After completing high school in 1975, he studied Electrical Engineering at the University of Stuttgart, Stuttgart, Germany, and graduated with an M.S.E.E. degree (Elektroingenieur) in 1981.

From 1981 to 1985, Schubert conducted research on III-V semiconductors under the guidance of Klaus Ploog at the MPI for Solid State Research in Stuttgart for which he was awarded a Ph.D. degree (Doktoringenieur) from the University of Stuttgart. From 1985 to 1995, he was employed at AT&T Bell Laboratories in Holmdel and Murray Hill, NJ, initially as a post-doctoral fellow, and later as a Member of Technical Staff and Principal Investigator. From 1995 to 2002, he was on the faculty of Boston University in Boston, MA. Since 2002, he has been on the faculty of Rensselaer Polytechnic Institute in Troy, NY where he has served as Professor of Electrical, Computer, and Systems Engineering, as well as other positions including Professor of Physics, Constellation Professor, and Founding Director and Principal Investigator of the Smart Lighting Engineering Research Center funded by the NSF.

== Technical contributions ==
Schubert made various contributions to LED research and development. During the transition from conventional incandescent and fluorescent lighting to present-day LED lighting, he showed that LED lighting technology has capabilities that transcend conventional lighting technologies. In particular, he showed that LED lighting sources can be controlled in terms of their spatial emission pattern, spectral composition, color temperature, temporal modularity, and polarization, thereby enabling "smart" lighting technologies. The controllability of LED lighting sources enables energy savings as well as high flexibility when tailoring lighting for specific needs. Schubert's contributions to LEDs include the commonly practiced roughening of semiconductor surfaces by crystallographic wet chemical etching to enhance light extraction in GaN LEDs. His contributions also include the resonant cavity LED that is characterized by a narrow emission line and a spatially directed emission. Schubert wrote several editions of an LED textbook, titled Light Emitting Diodes, that has been translated into Russian, Japanese, and Korean.

Schubert contributed to the understanding of the optical emission from semiconductor alloys, such as AlGaAs and InGaN. The optical emission from semiconductor alloys is spectrally broadened due to random fluctuations of the alloy's chemical composition. The spectral broadening is known as alloy broadening.

Semiconductors are commonly doped with doping atoms that determine the electrical conductivity of the semiconductors. Schubert developed the delta doping technique where doping atoms are confined to one or a few atomic layers of the semiconductor crystal. Associated doping profiles can be described by the mathematical delta function. Delta doping profiles are a fundamental limit in the miniaturization of doping profiles in semiconductors.

Schubert developed low-refractive-index materials, a class of thin film materials that can have refractive indexes close to that of air. The thin films are nano-porous and for this reason have a refractive index lower than their dense counterparts. Using low-refractive-index materials, Schubert demonstrated AR coatings with a gradually changing refractive index. The coatings reflect no light.

== Books ==
- Doping in III-V semiconductors E. F. Schubert, 606 pages, Cambridge University Press, Cambridge UK, ISBN 0-521-41919-0, published 1993 (Link to publisher; retrieved May 8, 2023).
- Delta Doping of Semiconductors E. F. Schubert (editor), 604 pages, Cambridge University Press, Cambridge UK, ISBN 0-521-48288-7, published 1996 (Link to publisher; retrieved May 8, 2023).
- Light Emitting Diodes (1st Edition) E. F. Schubert, 313 pages, Cambridge University Press, Cambridge ISBN 9780521533515, 0521533511, published 2003 (Link to Google Books; retrieved May 8, 2023).
- Light Emitting Diodes (2nd Edition) E. F. Schubert, 422 pages, Cambridge University Press, Cambridge ISBN 9780511790546, published 2006 (Link to publisher; retrieved May 8, 2023).
- Light Emitting Diodes (3rd Edition) E. F. Schubert, 672 pages, ISBN 9780986382666, 0986382663, published 2018 (Link to Google Books; retrieved May 8, 2023).
- Light Emitting Diodes (4th Edition) E. F. Schubert, 592 pages, ISBN 9780986382673, 0986382671, published 2023 (Link to Google Books; retrieved May 8, 2023).
- Physical Foundations of Solid State Devices E. F. Schubert, 318 pages, ISBN 9780986382628, 0986382620, published 2015 and 2022 (Link to Google Books; retrieved May 8, 2023).

== Awards and distinctions ==
- 1999: Fellow SPIE
- 1999: Fellow IEEE
- 2000: Discover Magazine Award for Technological Innovation.
- 2001: Fellow OSA
- 2001: Boston University Provost Innovation Fund Award.
- 2001: Fellow APS
- 2003–2006: Distinguished Lecturer] of the IEEE Electron Devices Society
- 2004: Elected member of Eta Kappa Nu
- 2007: 25 Most Innovative Micro- and Nano-Products of 2007 Award
- 2007: Scientific American 50 Award, as published in the January 2008 issue of Scientific American.
- 2008: Editors’ Choice of Science Magazine.
- 2022: Life Fellow Award] IEEE
