= Integra Bank =

Integra Bank Corporation
- Trade name: Integra Bank, N.A.
- Type: Public
- Traded as: Nasdaq: IBNK
- Industry: Banking
- Defunct: July 29, 2011; 15 years ago
- Fate: Insolvency
- Successor: Old National Bank
- Headquarters: Evansville, Indiana
- Area served: Indiana, Illinois, Kentucky, and Ohio
- Products: Financial services
- Website: Archived official website

- National City Bank
- U.S. National Register of Historic Places
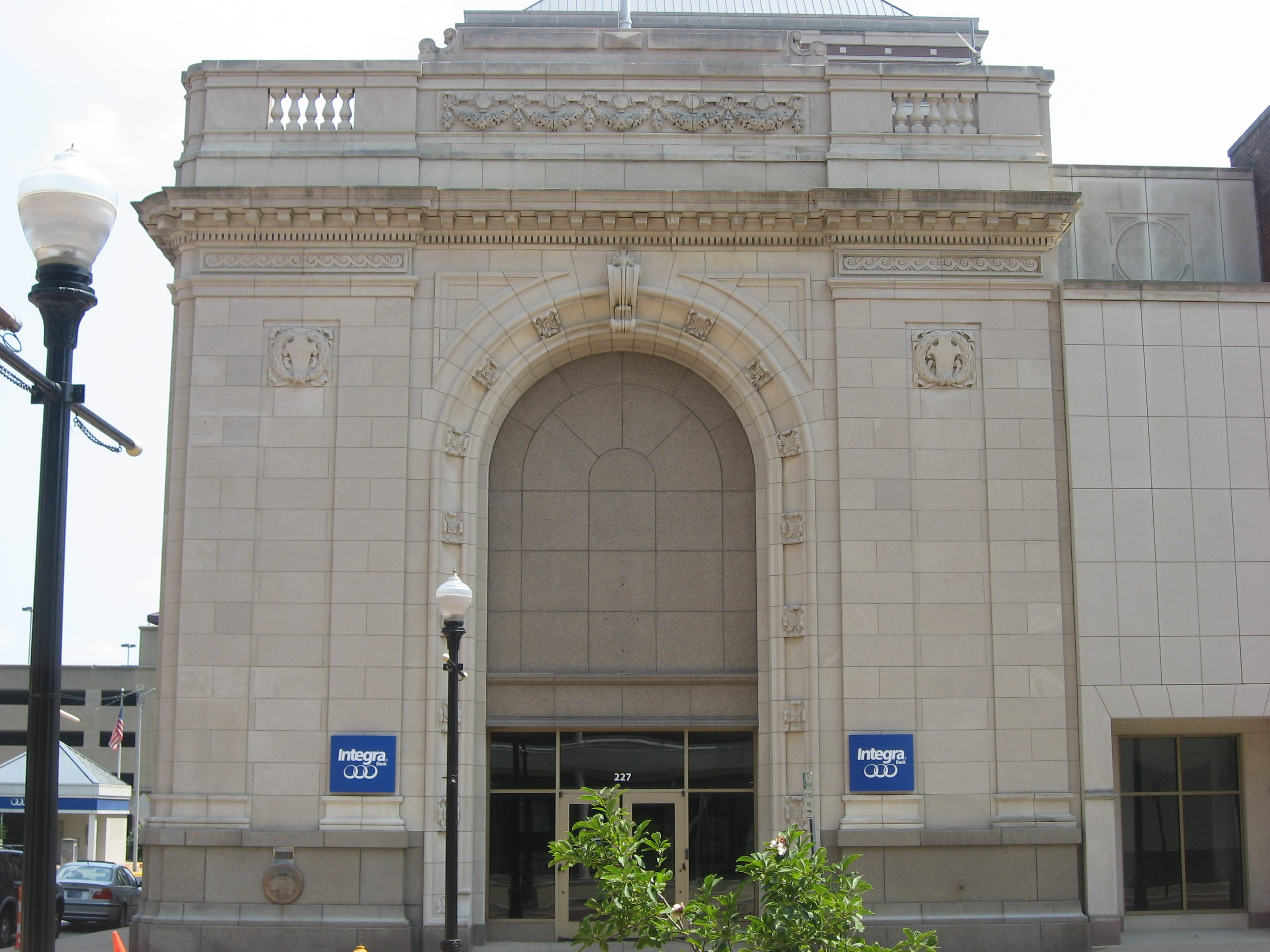
- Front of the bank
- Location: 227 Main St., Evansville, Indiana
- Coordinates: 37°58′15″N 87°34′20″W
- Area: Less than 1 acre (0.40 ha)
- Built: 1913
- Architect: Mundie & Jennie
- Architectural style: Second Renaissance Revival
- MPS: Downtown Evansville MRA
- NRHP reference No.: 82000112
- Added to NRHP: July 1, 1982

Integra Bank Corporation was the parent of Integra Bank National Association, a retail bank headquartered in Evansville, Indiana, that failed on July 29, 2011. As of March 31, 2010, Integra Bank had $2.9 billion in total assets and operated 67 banking centers and 116 ATMs at locations in Illinois, Indiana, Kentucky, and Ohio. The Second Renaissance Revival building was constructed in 1913, and originally housed the National City Bank.

The company's stock was traded on NASDAQ until it was delisted on May 2, 2011.

On Friday, July 29, 2011, Integra Bank National Association (N.A.), Evansville, was closed by the Comptroller of the Currency. Subsequently, the Federal Deposit Insurance Corporation (FDIC) was named receiver. All deposit accounts, excluding certain brokered deposits, were transferred to Old National Bank. The company then filed for bankruptcy.

A post-mortem audit by the Department of the Treasury found that the bank's decision to actively pursue commercial loans in large cities such as Chicago and Cincinnati was a major contributor to the bank's failure. During its decline through the Great Recession, Integra sold many assets and took more than $83 million in TARP funds. Despite these efforts, in its final full year of operation, Integra lost $124 million. The bank still owed US tax payers and the US government $81,635,660.

The company offered a variety of banking services that included commercial, consumer and mortgage loans, lines of credit, transaction accounts, credit cards, letters of credit, corporate cash management services, correspondent banking services, mortgage servicing, annuity products and services, selected insurance products, safe deposit boxes, and personal and corporate trust services.

The bank is not related to the former Integra Bank of Pittsburgh, Pennsylvania, that was bought out by National City in 1995. Coincidentally, Integra was itself once known as National City until adopting the current name in 2000, likely changing it due to the expanding presence of the much larger National City and the two having overlapping territories. Despite PNC Financial Services buying out the larger National City in late 2008, Integra Bank kept the name it has had for nine years.

== See also ==
- List of largest U.S. bank failures
