= KleinBank =

American Bank

- Company type: Private company
- Industry: Financial services
- Predecessor: The First National Bank of Chaska
- Founded: 1907
- Founder: George Klein
- Defunct: 2019
- Fate: Acquired
- Successor: Old National Bank
- Headquarters: Chaska, Minnesota, United States
- Area served: Minnesota
- Products: Banking services
- Parent: Old National Bank

KleinBank was an American bank based in Minnesota that operated from 1907 until it was acquired by Old National Bank in 2019. KleinBank was headquartered in Chaska, Minnesota and operated 21 bank branches. In 2019, KleinBank was the largest family-owned state bank in Minnesota with assets over $1.9 billion. After being acquired the bank branches were rebranded as Old National Bank.

== History ==
=== Founding ===
The sons of German immigrant and Minnesota farmer, George Klein, purchased controlling shares in The First National Bank of Chaska in 1907. Until that time, the two men, C.H. Klein and C.P. Klein, had been operating their father's brickyard. Klein had acquired the brickyard following a severe depression in 1893. It was the only remaining brickyard in Chaska which at one point had 11 individual brickyards in operation between 1857 and 1895.

C.H. Klein was elected to the Chaska School Board in 1900, to the Minnesota House of Representatives in 1902, and to the Minnesota Senate in 1910.

=== Expansion ===
The bank expanded west along the railroad as the Kleins helped organize banks in Victoria, Waconia, Montevideo, and Madison. Banks were also acquired in nearby Cologne and Young America during C.H. Klein's time as Bank President.

=== Management changes - 1960s ===
C.P. Klein's son, George, took over controlling interest in the Klein-owned banks after the deaths of C.H. Klein in 1961 and C.P. Klein in 1962. Under George Klein's direction, the Klein Bancorporation, Inc., (KBI) was created in 1975 to manage and supervise the Klein-owned banks.

George's son, Dan, became Chairman and President of KBI in 1979 after George's death in 1979. George's other two sons, Alan and Jim, became Senior Vice Presidents of KBI.

=== Consolidation - 1990s ===
In 1997, KBI was renamed Klein Financial as the company began to take steps toward consolidating their nine chartered banks. In 2005, the nine charted banks were successfully merged into a single charter and the banks renamed, KleinBank. On November 1, 2018 KleinBank became a division of Old National Bank

=== Timeline ===
- 1907 - C.H. Klein and C.P. Klein acquires controlling shares of The First National Bank in Chaska, MN
- 1911 - C.H. Klein opens Victoria State Bank in Victoria, MN
- 1919 - C.H. Klein helps form First National Bank of Waconia in Waconia, MN
- 1926 - C.H. Klein acquires controlling share of The State Bank of Young America in Young America, MN and The State Bank of Cologne in Cologne, MN
- 1927 - C.H. Klein opens Security National Bank in Montevideo, MN
- 1931 - C.H. Klein and C.P. Klein opens Klein National Bank of Madison in Madison, MN
- 1977 - The First National Bank of Waconia opens a new branch in St. Bonifacius, MN
- 1988 - KBI acquires Oakley National Bank in Buffalo, MN
- 1993 - KBI acquires The Chanhassen Bank in Chanhassen, MN
- 1997 - The First National Bank of Chaska opens a second branch in Chaska, MN
- 1998 - The First National Bank of Chaska opens a new branch in Shakopee, MN
- 2000 - KBI acquires Preferred Bank in Big Lake, MN
- 2002 - Preferred Bank opens a branch in Maple Grove, MN
- 2004 - The First National Bank of Chaska opens a new branch in Carver, MN
- 2006 - KleinBank opens a new branch in Lakeville, MN
- 2007 - KleinBank acquires an Eagle Valley Bank branch in Burnsville, MN
- 2008 - KleinBank acquires First Community Bank Savage in Savage, MN
- 2009 - KleinBank opens a new branch in Otsego, MN
- 2010 - KleinBank acquires Community Bank Plymouth in Plymouth, MN
- 2014 - KleinBank acquires Prior Lake State bank in Prior Lake, MN
- 2018- Old National Bank acquires 18 remaining branches of Klein Bank while Wings Financial buys three buildings of branches where Old National Bank already has banking centers
- 2019- KleinBank merges with its owner Old National Bank and all KleinBank branches close and reopen as Old National Bank banking centers

== Discriminatory lending practices ==
On January 13, 2017, the U.S. Department of Justice filed a lawsuit against KleinBank for alleged violations of the Fair Housing Act and Equal Credit Opportunity Act by structuring its home mortgage lending business to avoid serving neighborhoods where a majority of residents were racial and ethnic minorities. The lawsuit asserted that the bank's service area was in a horseshoe shape around the urban areas of Minneapolis and St. Paul (which had higher minority populations) and targeted its mortgage advertising solely toward white neighborhoods. The lawsuit also claimed that from 2010 to 2015, other comparable lenders generated 5.58% of their single-family residential loan applications related to residential property located in the majority-minority census tracks compared to KleinBank's 1.06%. The bank's website at the time indicated that it had 21 branches in suburbs west of Minneapolis and St. Paul and in western Minnesota—regions which, according to census data, were predominantly white.

== Accolades ==
- Minnesota Business Ethics Award (2011)
- Minnesota Family Business Award (2012)
- Star Tribune Top Workplace (2014)
- BBB Torch Awards for Ethics (2014)
- BBB International Torch Award for Ethics (2015)
- Star Tribune Top Workplace (2016)
- TCB Readers' Choice Best of Business | Best Business Bank (2016)
- TCB Readers' Choice Best of Business | Best Mortgage Company (2016)
- SBA Minnesota Lenders Awards | Large Lender (2016)
