= Old National Bank =

American Regional Bank

Old National Bancorp
- Trade name: Old National Bank
- Type: Public
- Traded as: Nasdaq: ONB; S&P 400 Component
- Industry: Finance
- Founded: 1834; 192 years ago (as Evansville National Bank)
- Headquarters: Chicago, Illinois; Evansville, Indiana; U.S.
- Number of locations: 180+
- Area served: Illinois, Indiana, Iowa, Kentucky, Michigan, Minnesota, Tennessee, Wisconsin
- Key people: James "Jim" Ryan (CEO); Jeff C. Newcom (COO)
- Products: Financial services
- Net income: ▲$277.5 million (2021) $226.5 million (2020)
- Total assets: ▲$24.5 billion (2021) $23.0 billion (2020)
- Number of employees: 2,900+ (2019)
- Website: oldnational.com

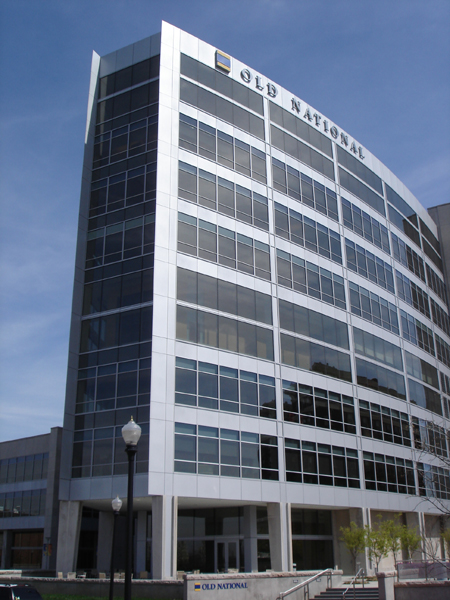
Old National Bank's Downtown Evansville riverfront headquarters was the first highrise in the state of Indiana to be built with LEED principles.

Old National Bank is an American regional bank with nearly 200 retail branches operated by Old National Bancorp and based in Chicago and Evansville, Indiana. With assets at $48.5 billion and 250 banking centers, Old National Bancorp is the largest financial services bank holding company headquartered in Indiana and one of the top 30 banking companies in the U.S. Old National Bank has locations in Illinois, Indiana, Iowa, Kentucky, Michigan, Minnesota, North Dakota, Tennessee, and Wisconsin.

== History ==
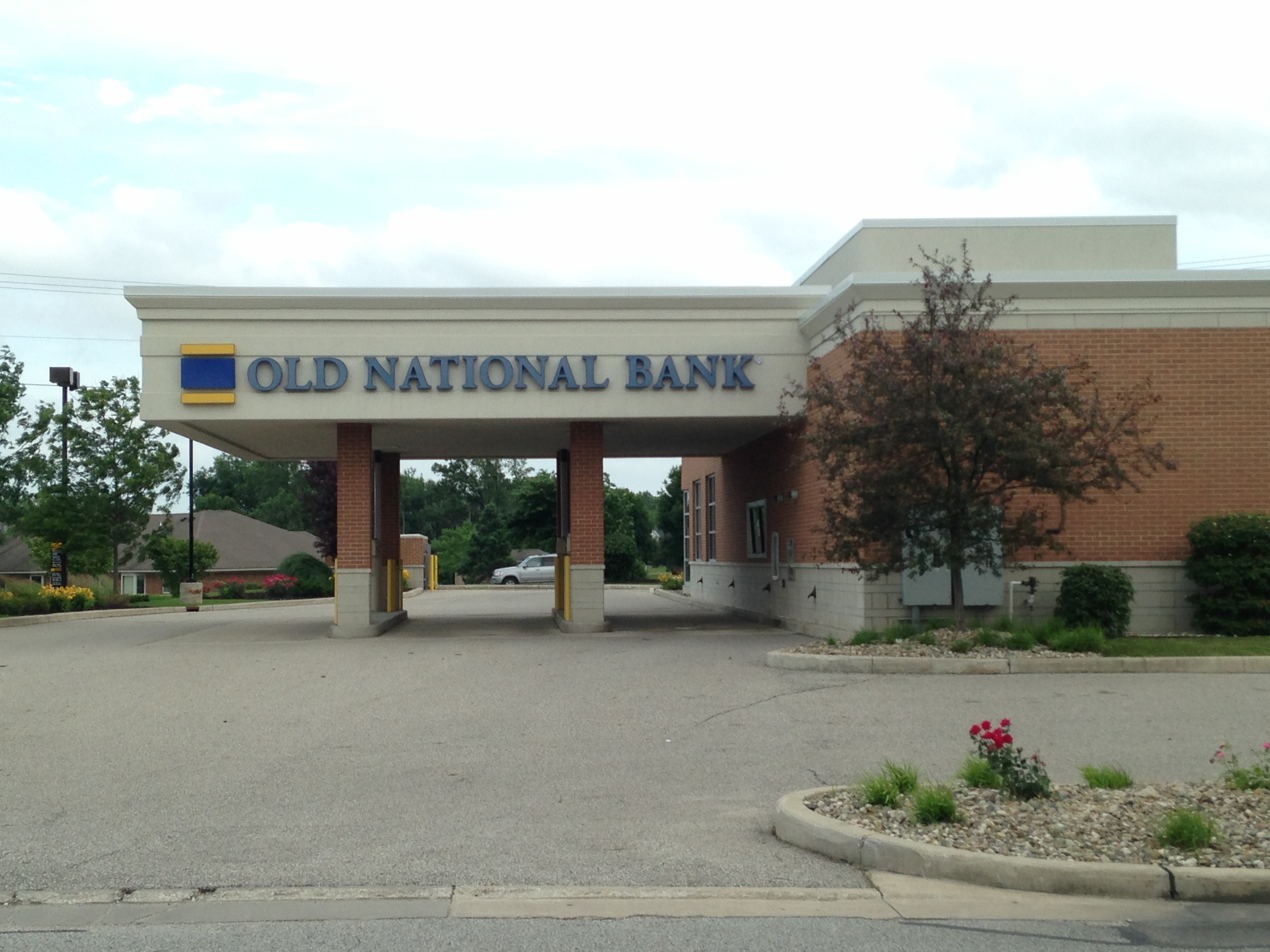
An Old National Bank location in Granger, Indiana

The bank was founded in 1834.

In November 1995, Old National acquired the Greencastle-based First United Savings Bank for $18 million in stock. In the following year, Old National acquired the Bloomington-based Workingmens Capital Holdings with its Workingmens Federal Savings Bank subsidiary for an undisclosed amount in stock.

In 2009, Charter One's Indiana bank branches became Old National Bank after Old National Bank bought Charter One's Indiana operations. In January 2011, Old National acquired Bloomington-based Monroe Bancorp with its Monroe Bank subsidiary for $90 million in stock. Later that year, Integra Bank was closed by the Federal Deposit Insurance Corporation and all deposit accounts, excluding certain brokered deposits, were transferred to Old National. In 2012, Old National acquired 24 retail bank branches of Bank of America in Indiana and Michigan. In 2014, Old National acquired four banks: Tower Bank in Fort Wayne, Indiana, United Bank in Ann Arbor, Michigan, Lafayette Savings Bank in Lafayette, Indiana, and Founders Bank & Trust in Grand Rapids, Michigan.

In May 2016, AnchorBank, the third-largest bank based in Wisconsin, was bought by Old National for approximately $461 million.

In August 2017, Old National agreed to buy Anchor Bank of Minnesota for $303 million. The acquisition will add 17 locations in the Twin Cities and 1 in Mankato plus $1.7 billion in deposits and $2.1 billion in assets. In June 2018, KleinBank, based in Chaska, Minnesota, announced its 21 locations were being acquired by Old National, increasing Old National's presence in the western suburbs of Minneapolis.

In 2021, Old National merged with First Midwest Bancorp, combining the companies' assets, retaining the Old National name, and maintaining headquarters in Chicago and Evansville.

On April 10, 2023, a mass shooting at the Louisville, Kentucky branch resulted in five fatalities (all employees) and eight other injured people, including a rookie police officer. The injured officer's partner subsequently killed the perpetrator, who was a current bank employee.

In 2024, it was announced that CapStar Financial Holdings Inc. merged its operations with those of the bank. As a result, CapStar Bank became a division of Old National Bank.

On November 25, 2024, Old National announced its purchase of Minnesota-based Bremer Bank in a $1.4 billion sale which was finalized in October, 2025. The merger created a combined bank worth $70 billion.

== Services ==
The company offers retail banking (checking accounts, savings accounts and certificates of deposit, consumer loans including home mortgages, and small business banking & lending), business or commercial banking (checking accounts, savings accounts & CDs, commercial loans and lines of credit, credit cards, capital markets, treasury management, and merchant services), and wealth management, investment, trust and retirement products and services.
