= TNInvestco =

TNInvestco is a US$200 million investment fund run by the State of Tennessee. Founded in 2009, its aim is to invest in the state economy and create jobs for Tennesseans.

== History ==
TNInvestco was established in 2009 by Matt Kisber, the commissioner of the Tennessee Department of Economic and Community Development, and Reagan Farr, the Commissioner of the Tennessee Department of Revenue.

By 2012, state auditors found "pervasive noncompliance with program requirements," leading to possible "risk of fraud, waste and abuse."

TNInvestco invested in Council Capital, a private equity and venture capital healthcare firm based in Nashville. In 2014, it invested US$750,000 in Digital Reasoning, an intelligence firm headquartered in Franklin, Tennessee.
