= Digital Reasoning =

American cognitive computing company

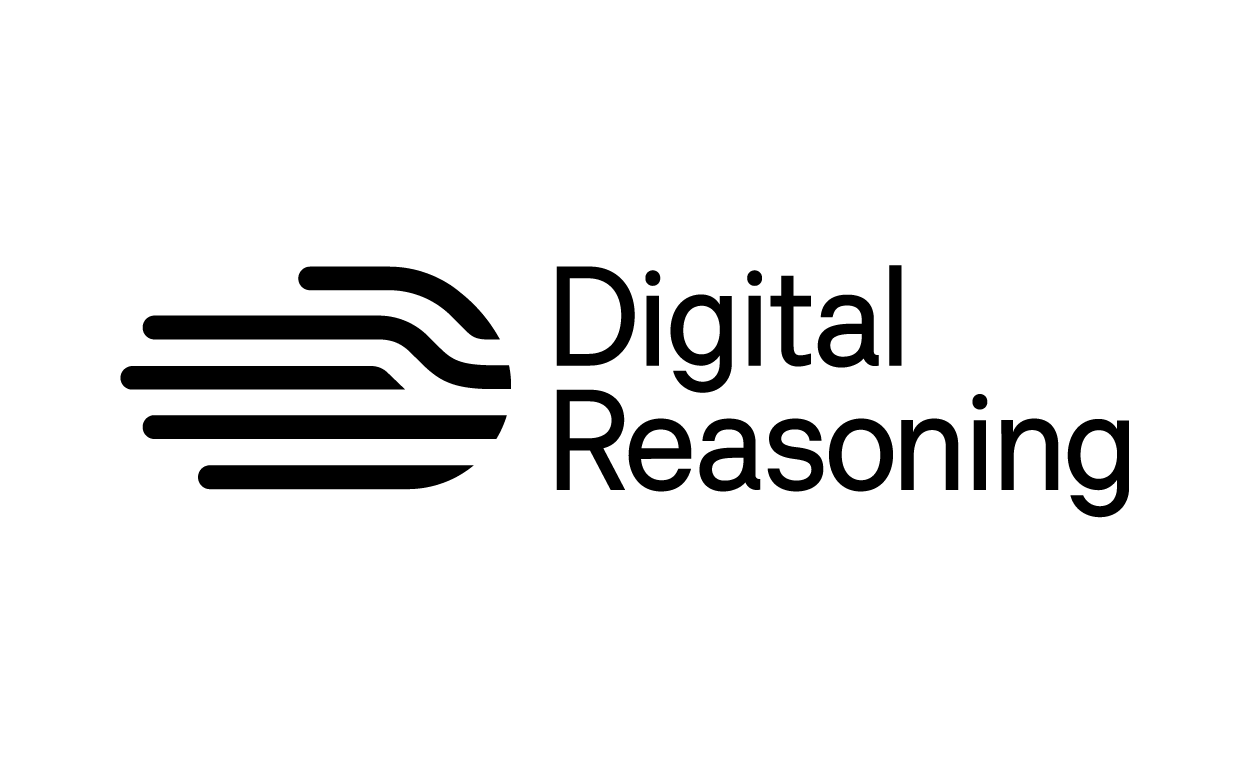
- Type: Private
- Founded: 2000; 26 years ago
- Founder: Tim Estes
- Defunct: November
- Fate: Acquired by Smarsh
- Headquarters: Franklin, Tennessee, United States
- Website: digitalreasoning.com

Digital Reasoning was an American company headquartered in Franklin, Tennessee. It offered cognitive computing services to intelligence agencies, financial institutions and healthcare organizations in the United States.

== History ==
Digital Reasoning was founded in 2000 by Tim Estes, a Knoxville-born philosophy senior at the University of Virginia with investment support from his mother, Dot Curry. It was headquartered in Franklin, Tennessee, with offices in Washington, D.C., New York City and London. At its peak in August 2015, the Franklin headquarters had 100 employees, 30 of whom had top secret clearance.

The firm presented its Synthesys software to the United States Army in 2002. They signed a contract with the National Ground Intelligence Center, a subsidiary of the United States Army Intelligence and Security Command, in 2004. Synthesys was used to track enemies in the War in Afghanistan from 2004 onwards. Six years later, in 2010, it received funding from In-Q-Tel, the venture capital firm of the Central Intelligence Agency.

Since 2012, the firm commercialized Synthesys software into banks and hedge funds, including UBS and Point72 Asset Management. Financial institutions use Synthesys to scan internal communications in search of unfamiliar patterns between employees, in terms of word-specific content, frequency and interpersonal connections. The software served as an electronic forensics investigatory tool and automated communications monitoring to detect fraud, insider trading and other white collar crimes in order to comply with SEC and Sarbanes-Oxley financial regulations.

In 2014, the firm received US$750,000 from the Tennessee Angel Fund of TNInvestco, a US$200 million fund from the State of Tennessee. It also received US$24 million from Credit Suisse Asset Management's NEXT Investors as well as Goldman Sachs. Other investors include the Partnership for New York City and the Nashville Capital Network. In 2016, with HCA as a tenet client, Digital Reasoning established a healthcare division led by Hal Andrews to leverage the Synthesys platform and proprietary NLP technologies to develop solutions for healthcare.

In March 2018, the firm announced US$30 million in funding led by BNP Paribas and joined by Barclays and Square Capital. Previous investors Goldman Sachs, Nasdaq, Lemhi Ventures, HCA, and the Partnership Fund for New York City also joined the round. This investment round was tied to hiring Brett Jackson as CEO in April 2017 and moving Estes into a non-operating role as President with the objective to move the company's core business into profitability.

In February 2019, Macquarie Group invested an undisclosed amount in Digital Reasoning. Simultaneously, senior executive leaders responsible for operations, including CEO Jackson and COO Marten den Haring, departed the company. In April 2020, company announced that co-founder Tim Estes assumed a co-CEO role with Brook Hazelton, an existing investor. Hazelton and the board navigated an acquisition by financial technology software company Smarsh in November 2020. Smarsh has maintained the Digital Reasoning compliance intelligence software as part of their financial technology services portfolio. Estes left Smarsh after the negotiated post-acquisition contractual period, followed by lawsuits and counter-suits in a fight to obtain financial incentive bonus payments which Smarsh contends Estes did not meet the criteria or fulfill the obligations to earn.

In April 2022, Chris Cashwell led the successful spin-out of the Digital Reasoning healthcare division into its own start-up Azra AI. As of April 2023, Azra AI has expanded into nearly 300 hospitals with AI software automating the detection, triage and treatment of cancer across over 10 million patients' electronic medical records with recognition as the Technology Company Start-Up of the Year by the Nashville Technology Council in 2023.
