= Dennis C. Bottorff =

American businessman, banker and philanthropist

- Born: 1944 or 1945 (age 81–82)
- Education: Vanderbilt University; Kellogg School of Management
- Occupation: Businessman
- Spouse: Jean Bottorff
- Children: 2

Dennis C. Bottorff (born 1944) is an American businessman, banker and philanthropist. As CEO of the First American Corporation, he oversaw its merger with AmSouth Bancorporation. He served as the chairman of the Tennessee Valley Authority from 2010 to 2012. He is the co-founder and general partner of Council Capital, a private equity and venture capital firm based in Nashville, Tennessee. He is also the co-founder and the chairman of CapStar Bank.

== Early life ==
Bottorff was born in 1944. He graduated from Vanderbilt University, where he received a Bachelor of Science in engineering in 1966. He received a master in business administration from the Kellogg School of Management in 1968. He was elected to the Honorary Electrical Engineering Society – Eta Kappa Nu in 1966 and the Honorary Business School Society – Beta Gamma Sigma in 1968.

== Career ==
In 1968, Bottorff joined Commerce Union Bank in Nashville, which later became part of Bank of America. He served as its president from 1981 to 1984, and as president and chief executive officer from 1984 to 1987. Subsequently, he served as the president of the Sovran Bank. He was responsible for its 1990 merger with the Citizens & Southern National Bank and served as president of the surviving organization.

Bottorff served as the chief executive officer and president of the First American Corporation from 1991 to 1999, and as its chairman from 1994 to 1999. He was responsible for its merger with the AmSouth Bancorporation, and served as its chairman until 2001. During the merger, he received $1.3 million annually in salary and bonuses, plus AmSouth Bancorporation shares worth $4.1 million and a $1.25 million annual retirement benefit for life.

In 2000, Bottorff co-founded Council Capital, a private equity firm in Nashville, serving as Managing General Partner until 2016. He now works as a senior advisor. Additionally, Bottorff co-founded the CapStar Bank in 2007. He serves as its chairman. He also serves as the chairman of NuScriptRX. He also served on the board of directors of Ingram Industries from 1990 to 2015. He is the namesake of an Ingram Marine Group boat.

Bottorff served on the boards of directors of the Tennessee Bankers Association and the American Bankers Association. He also served on the board of the Financial Services Roundtable.

Additionally, he served on the board of directors of Dollar General and Shoney's.

== Philanthropy ==
Bottorff has served on the board of trust of his alma mater, Vanderbilt University, since 1990 and as its vice chairman from 1999 to 2011 during which time he chaired the search committee for the 7th and 8th chancellor. He presently is a trustee emeritus. He and his wife donated US$1 million or more to the Nashville Symphony for the construction of the Schermerhorn Symphony Center in 2006.

He led the fundraising campaign for the center and, with his wife, donated over $700,000 to the United Way.^{19} Bottorff has served on and chaired the boards of the Nashville Symphony Association, Nashville Area Chamber of Commerce, the United Way of Middle Tennessee, the Tennessee Titans Advisory Board and the Tennessee Performing Arts Center.^{20} He has also served on the boards and served as the chairman of Partnership 2000, the Children's Hospital of Vanderbilt University and the Music City Bowl. He also served on the Boards of the Nashville Health Care Council, Nashville Sports Authority, Samaritan Center, Ensworth School, Norfolk Academy, Project Pencil, the Nashville Agenda and Inroads.^{21} Today he serves on the board of trustees of Leadership Nashville. and the advisory board of the Jack C. Massey Graduate School of Business at Belmont University.^{15}

== Personal life ==
Bottorff and his wife, Jean, have two children. His son, Todd, is the owner of the Turner Publishing Company. His son, Dennis "Chad" Bottorff, co-founded Eakin Partners, a commercial real estate firm in Nashville, in 1999. His sons Todd and Chad also own a tequila company called TC Craft which is only in Nashville, Wyoming and Florida at the moment.
