= Vincenzo Piuri =

Italian scientist and electrical engineer

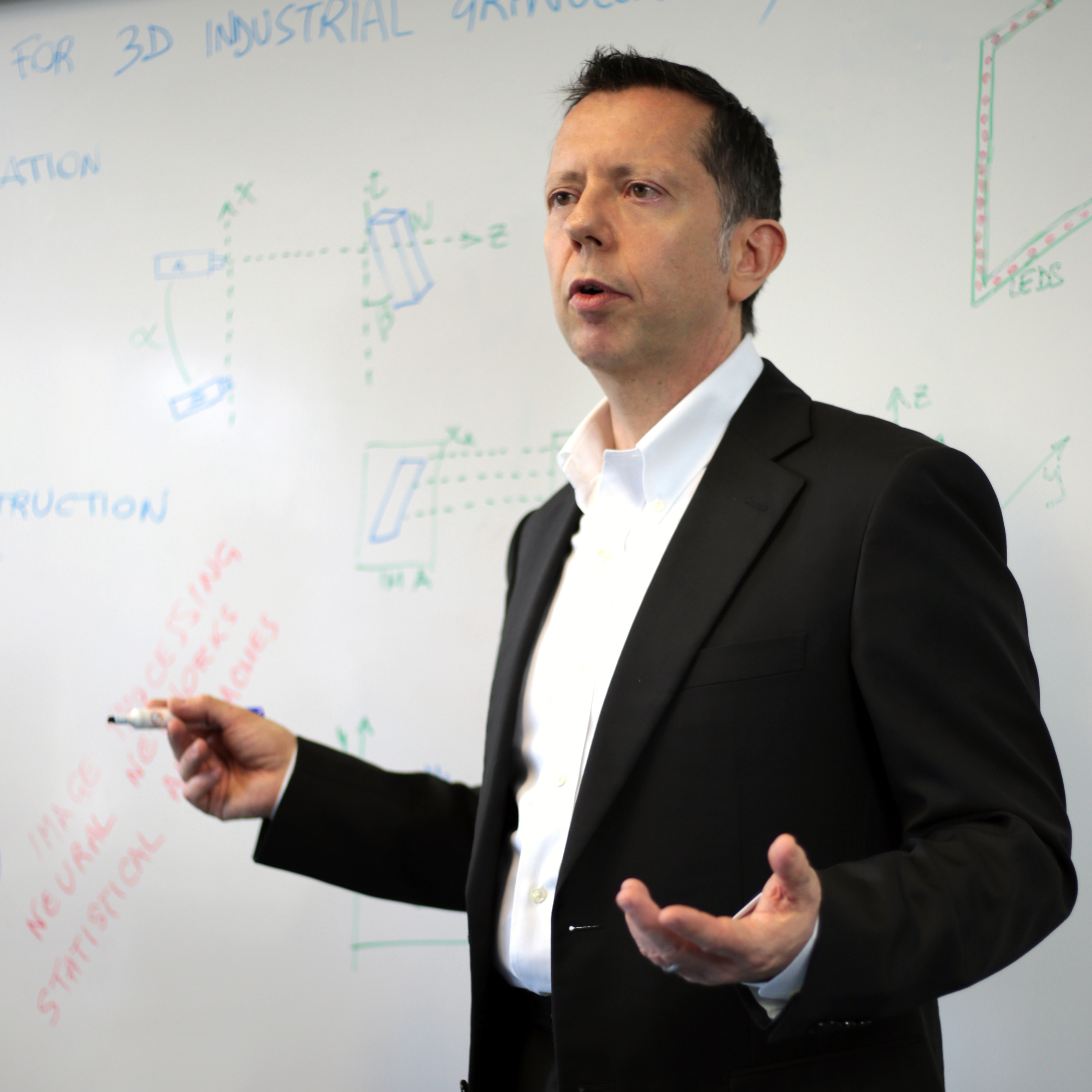
Piuri in 2018

Vincenzo Piuri (Italian pronunciation: [vinˈtʃɛntso ˈpjuːri]) is an Italian scientist. He is an IEEE Fellow and an ACM Distinguished Member. He is known for his work in the field of information processing, with specific focus on artificial intelligence, computational intelligence, signal/image processing, biometrics, industrial applications, measurement systems, arithmetic units and fault-tolerant architectures.

Piuri was elected for 2021–22 IEEE Region 8 Director-Elect (2023–24 IEEE Region 8 Director).

== Education and career ==
Piuri studied Electronic Engineering at the Polytechnic University of Milan, where he also obtained a Ph.D. in Electronic Engineering in 1989. Since 2000, he is a Professor of Computer Science at the University of Milan. Piuri was also visiting professor at the University of Texas in Austin and at George Mason University in Fairfax, Virginia.

He was the co-founder and president of Sensure, a start-up company in the area of intelligent systems for industrial applications.

== Scientific production ==
Vincenzo Piuri published 395 scientific papers in international journals and conferences and he is listed as one of the top Italian scientist in engineering.

He has been editor-in-chief of the IEEE Systems Journal (2013-2019). He is an Associate Editor of the IEEE Transactions on Computers (since 2014), the IEEE Transactions on Cloud Computing (since 2016), and Soft Computing (Springer, since 2011). He served as associate editor for the IEEE Transactions on Neural Networks (2001–04), the Journal of Systems Architecture (Elsevier, 2001–04) and the IEEE Transactions on Instrumentation and Measurement (1997-2002).

=== Books ===
Vincenzo Piuri co-authored four research books:

- (2015) Touchless Fingerprint Biometrics, CRC Press, ISBN 9781498707619
- (2014) Touchless Palmprint Recognition Systems, Springer, ISBN 978-3-319-10364-8
- (2013) 3D Surface Reconstruction, Springer, ISBN 978-1-4614-5631-5
- (2013) Semantic Analysis and Understanding of Human Behavior in Video Streaming, Springer, ISBN 978-1-4614-5485-4

== Awards ==
Vincenzo Piuri is an IEEE Fellow, an ACM Distinguished Member and an International Neural Network Society (INNS) Senior Member. He is an IEEE Eta Kappa Nu alumnus.

He received the IEEE Technical Activities Board Hall of Honor (2019), the IEEE Systems Council Outstanding Service Award (2018), the IEEE Instrumentation and Measurement Society Distinguished Service Award (2008), and the IEEE Instrumentation and Measurement Society Technical Award (2002).

He has been appointed as Honorary Professor at Northeastern University (Shenyang, China, 2018), Amity University (Noida, India, 2017), Muroran Institute of Technology (Japan, 2016), Obuda University (Budapest, Hungary, 2014), and Guangdong University of Petrochemical Technology (Maoming, China, 2014).

== Services ==
Vincenzo Piuri is a long-time member of the IEEE, which he served in many different roles. He was IEEE Vice President for Technical Activities (2015) and in the Technical Activities Strategic Planning Committee (2016, chair; 2011-2014, member). He was IEEE Director (2010-2012, 2015) and member of the IEEE Strategic Planning AdHoc Committee (2014, 2016).

He is President of the IEEE Systems Council (2020-2021). He was President of the IEEE Computational Intelligence Society (2006-2007), where he also served as Vice President for Members Activities (2003-2004). He is the founder and co-chair of the IEEE Environmental Engineering Initiative (since 2016). He was member of the Steering Committee of the IEEE Internet of Things Initiative (2016). He was Founding Chair of both of the IEEE Systems Council Italy Chapter (2008-2009) and the IEEE Biometrics Council Italy Chapter (2009). He was Vice Chair of the IEEE NTDC Technical Committee on Biometrics (2005-2008) and contributed to the creation of the IEEE Biometric Council (2006-2008). He was Funding Co-Chair of the Technical Committee on Intelligent Measurement Systems of the IEEE Instrumentation and Measurement Society (1997-2002). He also served as Co-Chair of the Technical Activity Committee on Defect Tolerance of the IEEE Computer Society Test Technology Technical Committee (1995-2006).

He served in the IEEE MGA Strategic Direction and Environmental Assessment Committee (2016), the IEEE Publication Services and Products Board (2013), the IEEE PSPB Strategic Planning Committee (2013, 2009–11), and the IEEE TAB/PSPB Products & Services Committee (2013, 2008–09, 2005–06). He has been Chair of the IEEE Awards Board Technical Field Awards Council (2017–18), where he also served as member (2014-2015, 2006-2008).
