= Tennessee Bankers Association =

- Formation: 1890 in Memphis, Tennessee
- Type: Industry trade group Professional association Advocacy group
- Region served: Tennessee
- Website: tnbankers.org

The Tennessee Bankers Association is a trade association for the banking industry in Tennessee, USA. It was established on October 13, 1890 in Memphis, Tennessee.
