= Council Capital =

American private equity and venture capital

- Founded: 2000
- Founder: Dennis C. Bottorff
- Headquarters: 30 Burton Hills Boulevard, Nashville, Tennessee, United States
- Website: councilcapital.com

Council Capital is a private equity and venture capital healthcare firm based in Nashville, Tennessee, U.S.

== History ==
The firm was founded in 2000 by Nashville businessman Dennis C. Bottorff as Council Ventures. It changed its name to Council Capital in 2011. It has US$150 million of assets under management.

Council Capital invests in "growth and early-growth stage health care companies." It has received funding from TNInvestco.

== Investments ==
The firm invested in Senior Whole Health, a Massachusetts-based healthcare insurance company, in 2004. By 2011, it sold its stake.

In 2011, it invested in Payment America Systems Inc., a healthcare company which provides "total revenue cycle management" of "patient-responsibility receivables."

It invested US$3.25 million in Ingenious Med, a healthcare software company headquartered in Atlanta, Georgia, in 2011. By 2014, after vastly expanding its marketshare, including selling its product to the Hospital Corporation of America, Council Capital sold its stake to North Bridge Growth Equity, a private equity firm based in Massachusetts.

In 2013, the firm acquired a majority stake in TMG Gases, a medical gas (including oxygen) company.

In October 2018, Council Capital invested in The Center for Neurological and Neurodevelopmental Health and The Clinical Research Center of New Jersey.
