= Joseph Bordogna =

American engineer

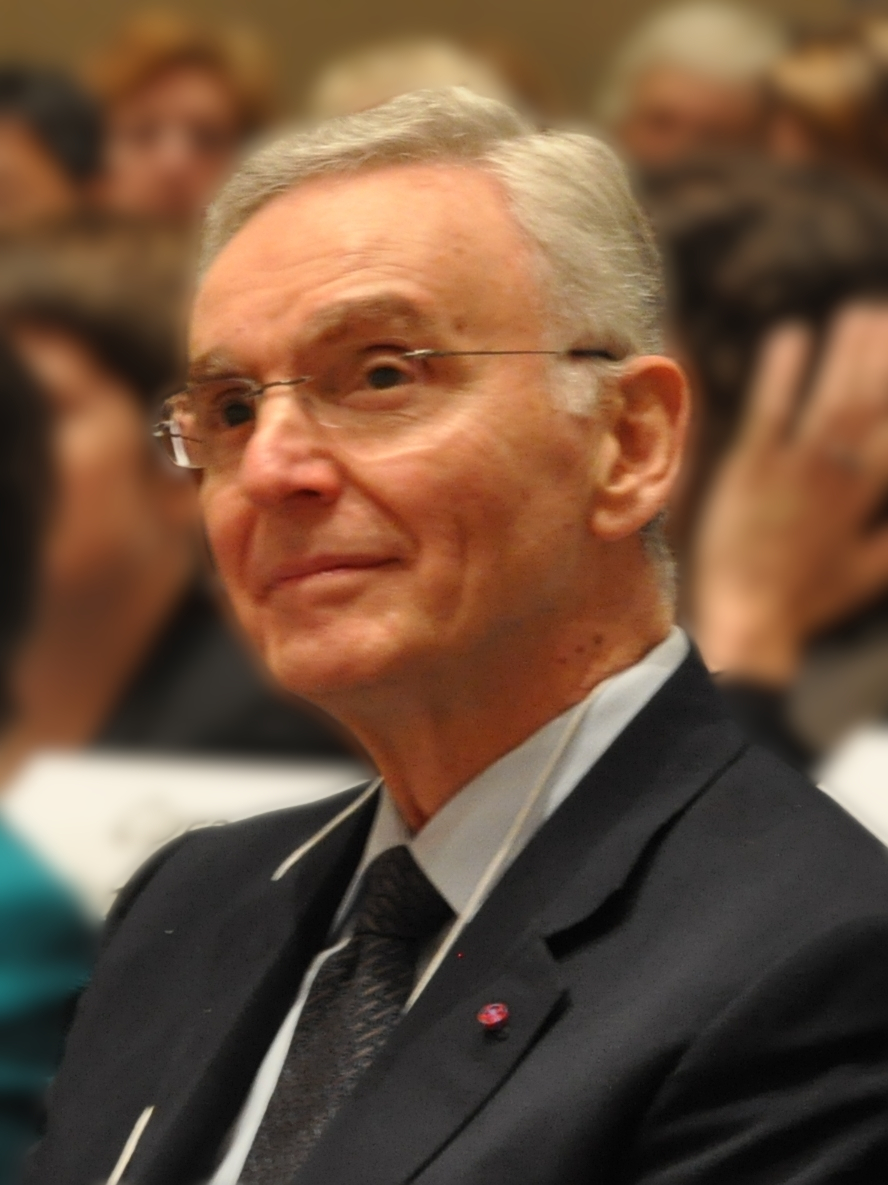
- Joseph Bordogna
- Born: 1933; United States
- Died: 2019 (aged 85–86); United States
- Occupations: Engineer and scientist

Joseph Bordogna (1933–2019) was an American scientist and engineer.

== Early life ==
Bordogna was born on March 22, 1933, in Scranton, Pennsylvania, United States. He was the son of Raymond and Rose Bordogna. He graduated from John Bartram Public High School in Philadelphia.

He completed his Bachelor of Science in Electrical Engineering at the University of Pennsylvania in 1955. He completed his Master of Science at the Massachusetts Institute of Technology in 1960.

He completed his PhD at the University of Pennsylvania in 1964.

== Career ==
He was the deputy director and chief operating officer of the National Science Foundation from 1999 to 2005. He served as the president of IEEE in 1998.

He was the Alfred Fitler Moore Professor of Engineering at the University of Pennsylvania where he served also as Director of The Moore School of Electrical Engineering, and Dean of the School of Engineering and Applied Science.

From 1991 to 2005, he worked at the U.S. National Science Foundation (NSF), first as head of the Directorate for Engineering, then appointed by the President as deputy director and chief operating officer of NSF. Complementary to these tasks he was a member of the President's Management Council and chaired committees on Manufacturing, Environmental Technologies, and Automotive Technologies in the President's National Science and Technology Council (NSTC).

== Awards and honours ==
He received the National Science Foundation Distinguished Service Medal; was an Eminent Member of Eta Kappa Nu; was a member of the IEEE Honor Society; and he was awarded IEEE's 2008 James H. Mulligan Jr. Education Medal, the Lifetime Achievement Award of the DC Council of Engineering and Architectural Societies, the US Government Leadership Award of the Semiconductor Industry Association and the Leadership in Technology Management Award from the International Conference on Management of Engineering and Technology.

== Personal life ==
Bordogna father job was as a carpenter for U.S. Naval Shipyard and his Mother was an assembly worker at a manufacturing plant

He graduated from John Bartram High School as Valedictorian with a General Electric prize for academic achievement.

He died on November 25, 2019, at the age of 86. He is survived by his wife Frances, son Ray and granddaughter Avery.

== See also ==
- Institute of Electrical and Electronics Engineers
- University of Pennsylvania
