= Richard B. Wells =

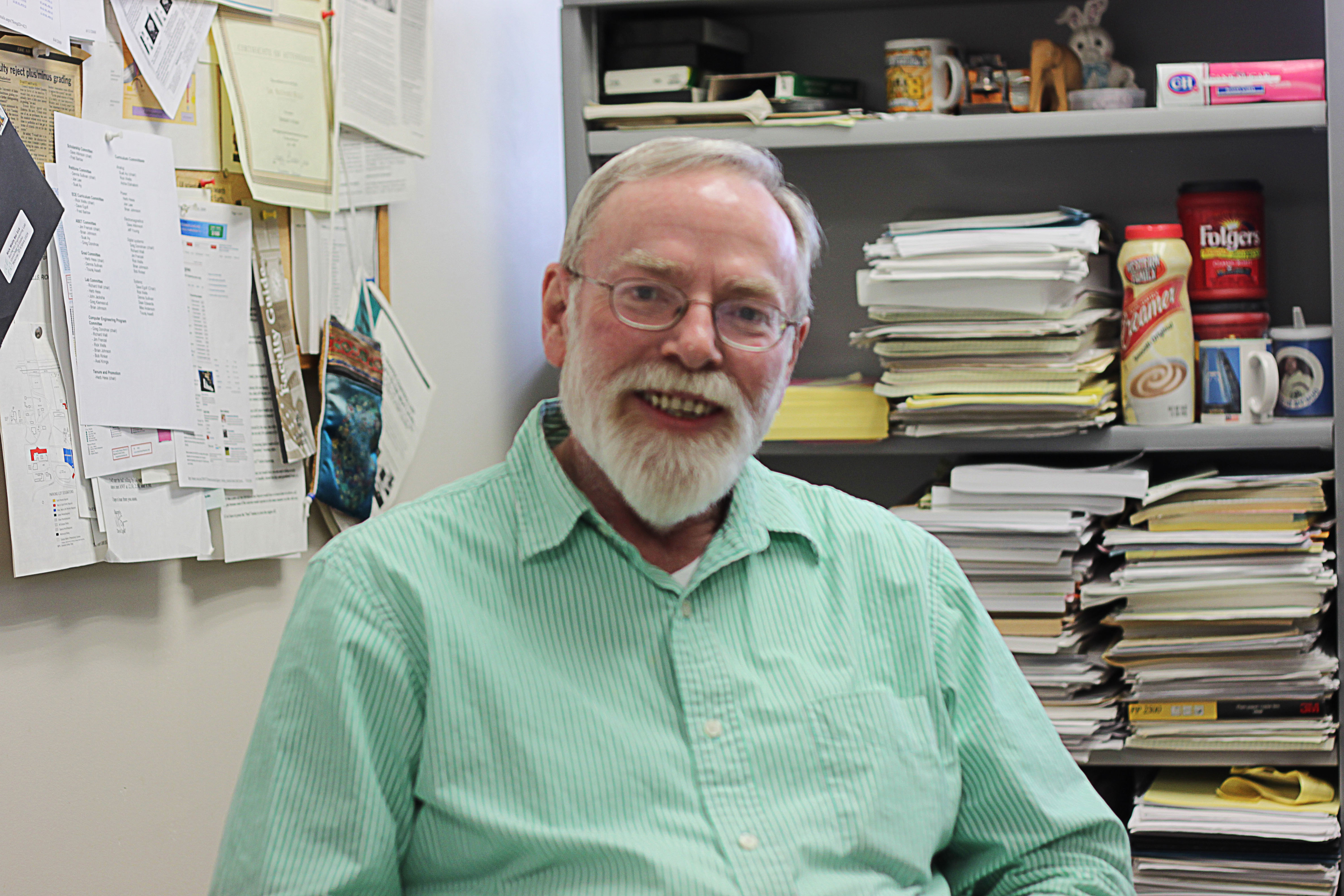
- Wells in 2013
- Born: September 6, 1953 (age 73); Maquoketa, Iowa, United States
- Died: February 13, 2024; Boise, Idaho
- Occupation: Professor Emeritus

Academic background
- Education: Ph.D., Electrical Engineering
- Alma mater: University of Idaho
- Thesis: System Theoretic Modeling of High-Density Digital Magnetic Recording (1985)

Richard B. Wells (born 1953) was a Professor Emeritus at the University of Idaho in Moscow, Idaho. From 2006 until his retirement in 2013, he held concurrent appointments as Professor of Electrical and Computer Engineering, Professor of Neuroscience, Adjunct Professor of Philosophy, and Adjunct Professor of Materials Science & Engineering. He was named as Senior Member of the Institute of Electrical and Electronics Engineers in 2001.

== Early life and education ==
Wells holds a B.S. degree in electrical engineering from Iowa State University in Ames, Iowa, where he graduated with distinction in May 1975. He received his M.S. in electrical engineering in May 1979 from Stanford University and his Ph.D. in electrical engineering in May 1985 from the University of Idaho.

== Textbooks ==
- Wells, Richard B. (1999). Applied Coding and Information Theory for Engineers. Prentice Hall. ISBN 9780139613272.
