= Leila De Floriani =

Italian computer scientist

- Born: Italy
- Education: University of Genova (Advanced degree in mathematics, 1977)
- Occupation: Computer scientist
- Employer: University of Maryland, College Park
- Organizations: IEEE Computer Society (President, 2020), Editor-in-Chief, IEEE Transactions on Visualization and Computer Graphics (2015–2018)
- Known for: Geometric modeling, image analysis, scientific visualization

Leila De Floriani is an American-Italian computer scientist and a professor at the University of Maryland at College Park. She was formerly a professor at the University of Genova (Italy). She was the 2020 IEEE Computer Society President and the Editor in Chief of the IEEE Transactions on Visualization and Computer Graphics from 2015 to 2018. In 1977, she received the advanced degree in mathematics from University of Genova.

She was named Fellow of the International Association for Pattern Recognition in 1998 for contributions to geometric modeling and image analysis, and Fellow of the Eurographics Association in 2020 for outstanding contributions, leadership, and service to the fields of Computer Graphics, Visualization, and for foundational contribution to starting one of the most vital research communities in Geometry and Graphics in Italy. She is also a Pioneer of the Solid Modeling Association for her seminal work in solid and feature-based modeling and an inducted member of the IEEE Visualization Academy. She is an IEEE Computer Society Golden Core member and an inducted member of the IEEE Honor Society Eta Kappa Nu.
