= CapStar Bank =

Bank based in Tennessee, United States

- Founded: July 14, 2008; 17 years ago
- Founder: Dennis C. Bottorff; Claire W. Tucker
- Headquarters: Suite 700, 1201 Demonbreun Street, Nashville, Tennessee, United States
- Key people: Dennis C. Bottorff; (Chairman); Timothy K. Schools; (CEO and President)
- Total assets: US$3 billion (2021)
- Owner: Old National Bancorp; (2024–present)
- Website: capstarbank.com

CapStar Bank is a bank based in Nashville, Tennessee, United States. Founded in 2008, it offers a full range of commercial and consumer financial products and services.

The bank has branches in Athens, Brentwood, Cleveland, Collinwood, Etowah, Hendersonville, Gallatin, Knoxville, Lawrenceburg, Madisonville, Manchester, Murfreesboro, Nashville, Sweeetwater, Waynesboro and Woodbury.

== History ==
CapStar Bank was co-founded by Dennis C. Bottorff and Claire W. Tucker on July 14, 2008, with U.S. $88 million. It had grown upwards of U.S. $3 billion in assets by 2021.

In 2018, four years after its parent CapStar Financial Holdings (CSFH) formed Farmington Mortgage as its home mortgage subsidiary, the bank acquired Athens Bancshares Corp. (Athens Federal Community Bank), adding eight East Tennessee financial centers. In 2020, it purchased FBC Corporation, including the First National Bank of Manchester and the Bank of Waynesboro.

In April 2024, it was announced that CSFH had completed the merger of its operations with those of Old National Bancorp. With this transaction, CapStar Bank will become a division of Old National.
