= Wilbur R. LePage =

American academic

Wilbur Reed LePage (Nov 16, 1911-Apr 9, 1996) was an American professor and department chair of electrical engineering at Syracuse University. A native of Kearny, N.J., LePage lived in Syracuse for 48 years. He joined the staff of Syracuse University's college of applied sciences in 1947 and served as chairman of the electrical engineering department from 1956 to 1974. He was the author of numerous textbooks, including Complex Variables and the Laplace Transform for Engineers and Applied APL Programming. He was a noted authority on the APL programming language.

During World War II, he helped develop the proximity fuze, used to detonate explosives when they are close enough to damage their target.

In 1953, LePage testified before Senator Joseph McCarthy, denying having any Communist affiliations during his time at the Griffiss Air Force Base radar research center.

LePage graduated from Cornell University with a degree in electrical engineering in 1933, earned a master's from the University of Rochester, and returned to Cornell to earn a PhD in 1941. He was a member of the Quill and Dagger society. He also held membership in the American Institute of Electrical Engineers, Sigma Xi, Tau Beta Pi, Eta Kappa Nu, and Phi Kappa Phi.
