= Alloy broadening =

Alloy broadening is a mechanism by which the spectral lines of an alloy are broadened by the random distribution of atoms within the alloy. It is one of a number of spectral line broadening mechanisms.

Alloy broadening occurs because the random distribution of atoms in an alloy causes a different material composition at different positions. In semiconductors and insulators the different material composition leads to different band gap energies. This gives different exciton recombination energies. Therefore, depending on the position where an exciton recombines the emitted light has a different energy. The alloy broadening is an inhomogeneous line broadening, meaning that its shape is Gaussian.

== Binary alloy ==
In the mathematical description it is assumed that no clustering occurs within the alloy. Then, for a binary alloy of the form $\ce{A_{1-x}B_{x}}$, e.g. $\ce{Si_{1-x}Ge_{x}}$, the standard deviation of the composition is given by:

$$\Delta x = \sqrt{\frac{x \cdot (1-x)}{N}}$$,

where $N$ is the number of atoms within the excitons' volume, i.e. $N = V_{exc} \cdot n$ with $n$ being the atoms per volume. In general, the band gap energy $E_{g}$ of a semiconducting alloy depends on the composition, i.e. $E_{g}$. The band gap energy can be considered to be the fluorescence energy. Therefore, the standard deviation in fluorescence is:

$$\Delta E = \frac{\mathrm d E_{g}}{\mathrm dx} \cdot \sqrt{x \cdot \frac{1-x}{N}}$$

As the alloy broadening belongs to the group of inhomogeneous broadenings the line shape of the fluorescence intensity $I(E)$ is Gaussian:

$$I(E) \sim \exp\left(- \frac{(E - E_{0})^2}{2 \cdot \Delta E^2}\right)$$
