= List of federal judges appointed by Abraham Lincoln =

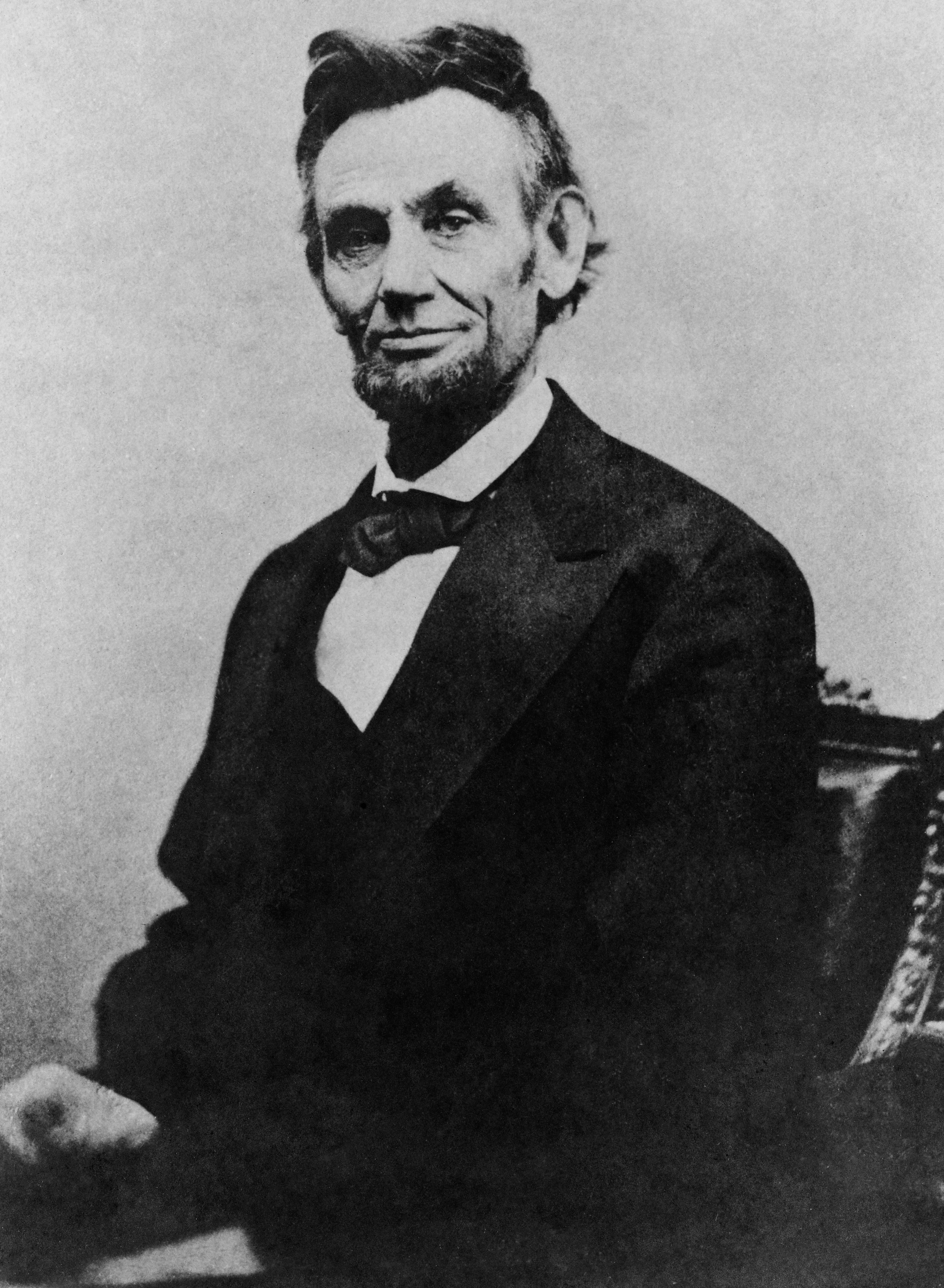
Abraham Lincoln.

Following is a list of all Article III United States federal judges appointed by President Abraham Lincoln during his presidency. In total Lincoln appointed 32 Article III federal judges, including 4 Associate Justices and 1 Chief Justice to the Supreme Court of the United States, and 27 judges to the United States district courts. Lincoln appointed no judges to the United States circuit courts during his time in office.

In 1863, the United States Circuit Court for the District of Columbia, which had existed since 1801, was abolished. The Supreme Court of the District of Columbia (now the United States District Court for the District of Columbia) was established in its place with 1 Chief Justice and 3 Associate Justices, all 4 positions being filled by Lincoln. These 4 positions are included in the 27 District Judges appointed by Lincoln.

Lincoln appointed 4 judges to the United States Court of Claims, an Article I tribunal. He later laterally reappointed 1 of those judges as Chief Justice of the same court.

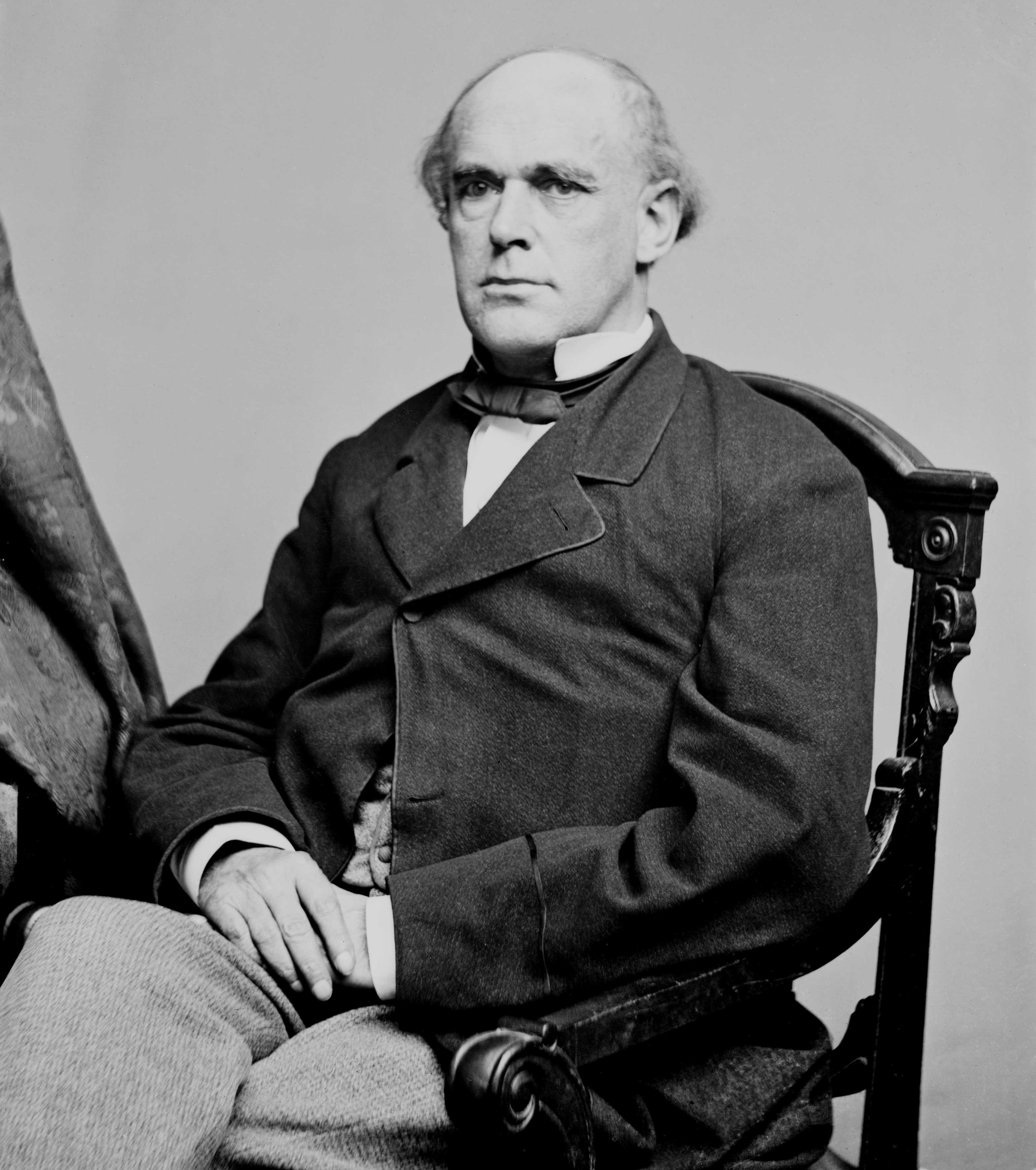
Salmon Portland Chase was Lincoln's choice to be Chief Justice of the United States.

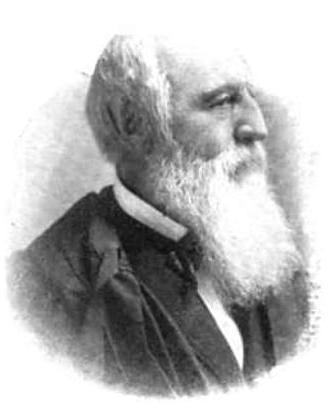
John Jay Jackson, Jr. was appointed to what was then the Western District of Virginia - which became the District of West Virginia. He remained on the bench until 1905.

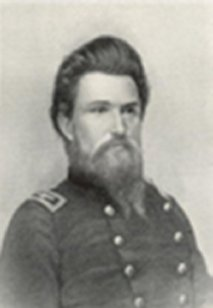
Appointed by Lincoln to the United States District Court for the Eastern District of Arkansas, Henry Clay Caldwell was later elevated by President Benjamin Harrison to sit on the Eighth Circuit.

== United States Supreme Court justices ==
#	Justice	Seat	State	Former justice	Nomination date	Confirmation date	Began active service	Ended active service
1	Noah Haynes Swayne	6	Ohio	John McLean	January 21, 1862	January 24, 1862	January 24, 1862	January 24, 1881
2	Samuel Freeman Miller	4	Iowa	Peter Vivian Daniel	July 16, 1862	July 16, 1862	July 16, 1862	October 13, 1890
3	David Davis	8	Illinois	John Archibald Campbell	December 1, 1862	December 8, 1862	October 17, 1862	March 4, 1877
4	Stephen Johnson Field	9	California	Seat established	March 6, 1863	March 10, 1863	March 10, 1863	December 1, 1897
5	Salmon P. Chase	Chief	Ohio	Roger B. Taney	December 6, 1864	December 6, 1864	December 6, 1864	May 7, 1873

== District courts ==
#	Judge	Court (Note: See List of United States district and territorial courts)	Nomination date	Confirmation date	Began active service	Ended active service
1	Archibald Williams	D. Kan.	March 8, 1861	March 12, 1861	March 12, 1861	September 21, 1863
2	George Washington Lane	M.D. Ala. N.D. Ala. S.D. Ala.	March 26, 1861	March 28, 1861	March 28, 1861	November 12, 1863
3	John Jay Jackson Jr.	W.D. Va./D. W.Va./ N.D. W. Va.	July 26, 1861	August 3, 1861	August 3, 1861	March 15, 1905
4	Fletcher Mathews Haight	S.D. Cal.	August 5, 1861	August 5, 1861	August 5, 1861	February 23, 1866
5	Bland Ballard	D. Ky.	December 9, 1861	January 22, 1862	October 16, 1861	July 29, 1879
6	Philip Fraser	N.D. Fla.	June 14, 1862	July 17, 1862	July 17, 1862	July 26, 1876
7	Connally Findlay Trigg	E.D. Tenn. M.D. Tenn. W.D. Tenn.	July 16, 1862	July 17, 1862	July 17, 1862	April 25, 1880; April 25, 1880; June 14, 1878
8	Caleb Blood Smith	D. Ind.	December 16, 1862	December 22, 1862	December 22, 1862	January 7, 1864
9	Richard Stockton Field	D.N.J.	January 14, 1863	January 14, 1863	January 14, 1863	April 25, 1870
10	David Kellogg Cartter	D.D.C.	March 10, 1863	March 11, 1863	March 11, 1863	April 16, 1887
11	George P. Fisher	D.D.C.	March 10, 1863	March 11, 1863	March 11, 1863	May 1, 1870
12	Abram B. Olin	D.D.C.	March 10, 1863	March 11, 1863	March 11, 1863	January 13, 1879
13	Solomon Lewis Withey	W.D. Mich.	February 26, 1863 (Note: Renominated on March 10, 1863.)	March 11, 1863	March 11, 1863	April 25, 1886
14	Andrew Wylie	D.D.C.	March 18, 1863 (Note: Originally nominated on March 10, 1863. Confirmed on March 12, 1863. Senate voted to reconsider nomination on March 13, 1863. Renominated on January 5, 1864.)	January 20, 1864	March 18, 1863	May 1, 1885
15	John Curtiss Underwood	E.D. Va./D. Va.	January 5, 1864	January 25, 1864	March 27, 1863	December 7, 1873
16	Edward Henry Durell	E.D. La./D. La.	January 5, 1864 (Note: Originally nominated on January 5, 1864. Nomination returned on February 3, 1864. Renominated on February 8, 1864.)	February 17, 1864	May 20, 1863	December 4, 1874
17	Mark W. Delahay	D. Kan.	December 14, 1863	March 15, 1864	October 6, 1863	December 12, 1873
18	Thomas Jefferson Boynton	S.D. Fla.	January 5, 1864	January 20, 1864	October 19, 1863	January 1, 1870
19	Richard Busteed	M.D. Ala. N.D. Ala. S.D. Ala.	January 5, 1864	January 20, 1864	November 17, 1863	October 20, 1874
20	Albert Smith White	D. Ind.	January 14, 1864	January 18, 1864	January 18, 1864	September 4, 1864
21	Henry Clay Caldwell	E.D. Ark. W.D. Ark.	May 2, 1864	May 28, 1864	June 20, 1864	March 13, 1890; March 3, 1871
22	David McDonald	D. Ind.	December 12, 1864	December 13, 1864	December 13, 1864	August 25, 1869
23	J. Russell Bullock	D.R.I.	February 9, 1865	February 11, 1865	February 11, 1865	September 15, 1869
24	Charles L. Benedict	E.D.N.Y.	March 6, 1865	March 9, 1865	March 9, 1865	January 1, 1897
25	Arnold Krekel	W.D. Mo.	March 6, 1865	March 9, 1865	March 9, 1865	June 9, 1888
26	Alexander W. Baldwin	D. Nev.	March 10, 1865	March 11, 1865	March 11, 1865	November 14, 1869
27	John Lowell	D. Mass.	March 11, 1865	March 11, 1865	March 11, 1865	January 9, 1879

== Specialty courts (Article I) ==
=== United States Court of Claims ===
#	Judge	Nomination date	Confirmation date	Began active service	Ended active service
1	Joseph Casey	July 9, 1861	July 22, 1861	May 23, 1861	March 13, 1863
1.1	Joseph Casey	March 12, 1863	March 13, 1863	March 13, 1863	December 1, 1870
2	Ebenezer Peck	March 6, 1863	March 10, 1863	March 10, 1863	May 1, 1878
3	David Wilmot	March 6, 1863	March 7, 1863	March 7, 1863	March 16, 1868
4	Charles C. Nott	February 21, 1865	February 22, 1865	February 22, 1865	November 23, 1896

== Notes ==
Renominations

== Sources ==
- Federal Judicial Center
