= List of United States federal courthouses in Kansas =

Following is a list of current and former courthouses of the United States federal court system located in Kansas. Each entry indicates the name of the building along with an image, if available, its location and the jurisdiction it covers, the dates during which it was used for each such jurisdiction, and, if applicable the person for whom it was named, and the date of renaming. Dates of use will not necessarily correspond with the dates of construction or demolition of a building, as pre-existing structures may be adapted or court use, and former court buildings may later be put to other uses. Also, the official name of the building may be changed at some point after its use as a federal court building has been initiated.

== Courthouses ==
Courthouse	City	Image	Street address	Jurisdiction	Dates of use	Named for
U.S. Court House & Post Office	Fort Scott		First Street & Scott Avenue	D. Kan.	1890–1936; Razed in 1946	n/a
U.S. Post Office & Court House	Fort Scott		120 South National Avenue	D. Kan.	1936–? Still in use as a post office.	n/a
U.S. Post Office	Kansas City		7th & Minnesota	D. Kan. United States Circuit Court	1902–1959; 1948–1959; Razed in 1962.	n/a
Wyandotte County Court Services Building	Kansas City		812 North 7th Street	D. Kan.	1959–1994; Now in use by Wyandotte County.	n/a
Robert J. Dole U.S. Court House	Kansas City		500 State Avenue	D. Kan.	1994–present	U.S. Senator Bob Dole
U.S. Court House & Post Office	Leavenworth		Northeast corner Shawnee & 4th Sts.	D. Kan. United States Circuit Court	1890–1859; 1890–1912; Razed ca. 1959.	n/a
U.S. Post Office & Court House	Salina		7th & Iron Sts.	D. Kan.	1896–1938; Razed in 1962.	n/a
U.S. Post Office & Court House	Salina		211 West Iron Avenue	D. Kan.	1938–? Now the Smoky Hill Museum.	n/a
U.S. Court House & Post Office	Topeka		5th & Kansas Ave.	D. Kan. United States Circuit Court	1884–1932; 1884–1912; Razed in 1933.	n/a
U.S. Post Office and Court House^{†}	Topeka		424 Kansas Street	D. Kan.	1933–1977; Still in use as a post office.	n/a
Frank Carlson Federal Building & U.S. Courthouse	Topeka		444 Southeast Quincy Street	D. Kan.	1977–present	Governor, U.S. Representative, and U.S. Senator Frank Carlson
U.S. Post Office & Court House	Wichita		Market & William Sts.	D. Kan.	1890–1932; Razed in 1936.	n/a
U.S. Post Office and Federal Building†	Wichita		401 North Market Street	D. Kan.	1932–present	n/a

== Key ==
^{†}	Listed on the National Register of Historic Places (NRHP)
^{††}	NRHP-listed and also designated as a National Historic Landmark
