= Kate E. Brubacher =

American lawyer

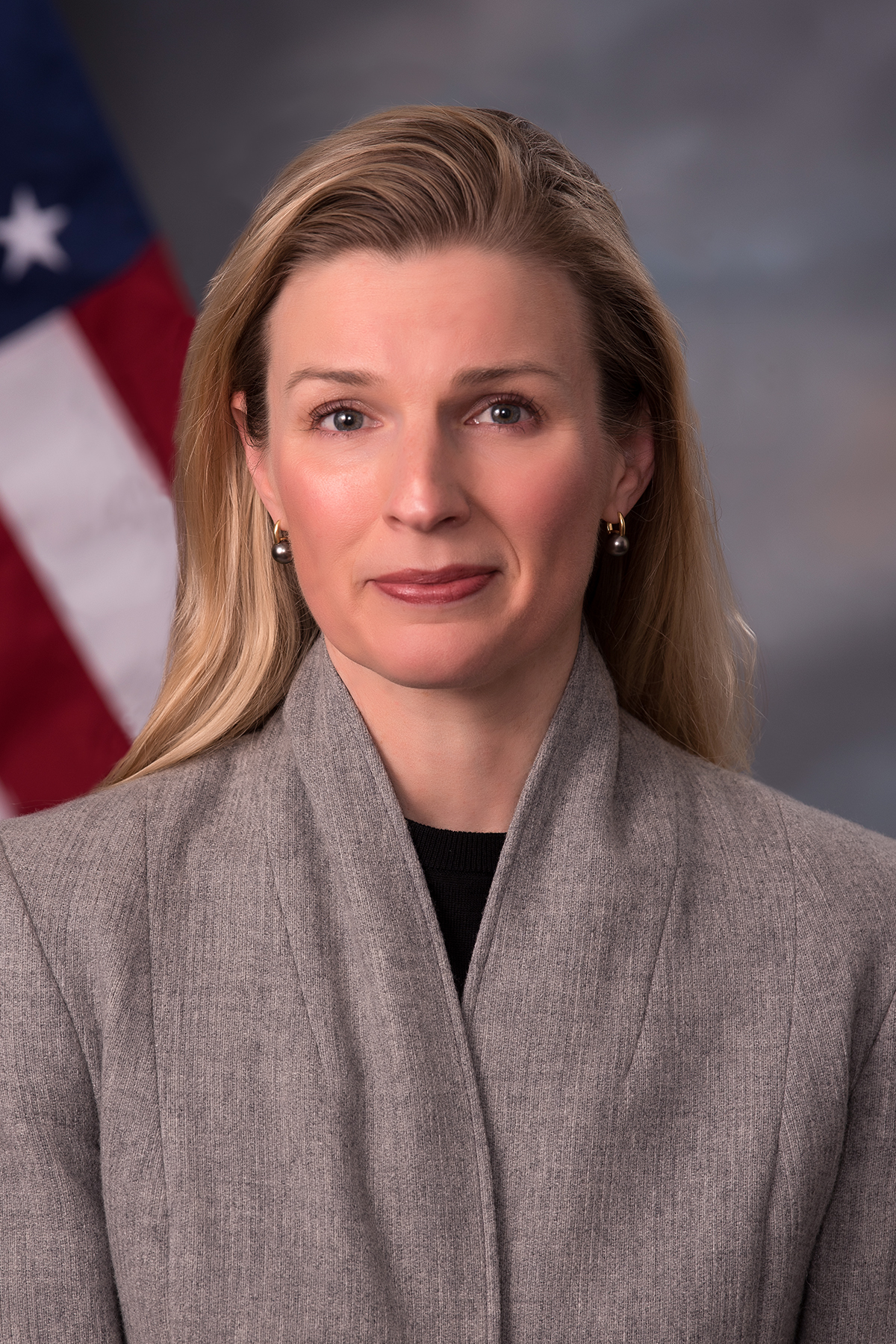

United States Attorney for the District of Kansas
- In office March 10, 2023 – January 23, 2025
- Appointed by: Joe Biden
- Preceded by: Stephen McAllister; Duston J. Slinkard
- Succeeded by: Ryan A. Kriegshauser

Personal details
- Education: Stanford University (BA, MA); Yale University (MAR, JD)

Kate Emily Brubacher is an American lawyer who served as the United States attorney for the District of Kansas from March 2023 to January 2025.

== Early life and education ==
Brubacher is a native of North Newton, Kansas. She received a Bachelor of Arts and Master of Arts from Stanford University in 2003. She received a Master of Arts from Yale Divinity School in 2007 and a Juris Doctor from Yale Law School in 2010.

== Career ==
After graduating from law school, Brubacher was an analyst with Essex Management Company in New York City from 2010 to 2011. From 2011 to 2012, she was an associate at Cravath, Swaine & Moore in New York City. From 2012 to 2016, she was an associate at Cooley LLP. From 2016 to August 2022, she served as an assistant prosecuting attorney in the Jackson County, Missouri Prosecuting Attorney's Office. She was part of a team that successfully fought for the release of Kevin Strickland, a Kansas City man who served more than 40 years in prison for a triple murder he did not commit.

=== Nomination as U.S. attorney ===
On November 29, 2022, President Joe Biden nominated Brubacher to be the United States attorney for the District of Kansas. On January 3, 2023, her nomination was returned to the president under Rule XXXI, Paragraph 6 of the United States Senate. She was renominated on January 23, 2023. On February 16, 2023, her nomination was reported out of the Senate Judiciary Committee by a 14–7 vote. She was confirmed by a voice vote on March 7, 2023. She was sworn in on March 10, 2023.

Legal offices
Preceded by Stephen McAllister; Duston J. Slinkard	United States Attorney for the District of Kansas; 2023–present	Incumbent
