= United States District Court for the District of Kansas =

United States federal district court of Kansas

Coordinates: 39.11701°N 94.62218°W

- (D. Kan.)
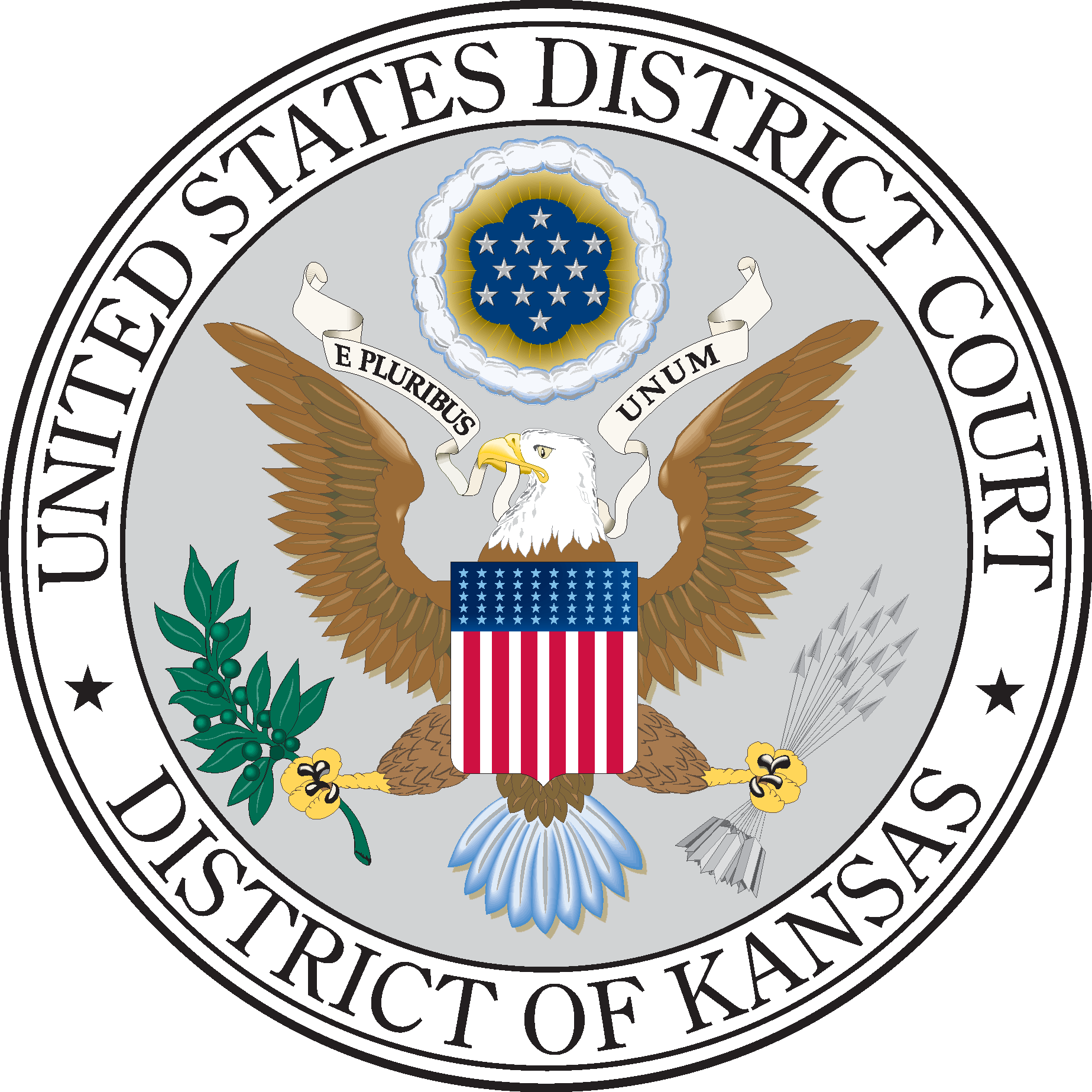

- Location: Kansas City More locations: Topeka; United States Post Office and Federal Building (Wichita); Lawrence; Leavenworth; Salina; Hutchinson; Dodge City; Fort Scott
- Appeals to: Tenth Circuit
- Established: January 29, 1861
- Judges: 6
- Chief Judge: John W. Broomes

Officers of the court
- U.S. Attorney: Ryan Kriegshauser
- U.S. Marshal: Ronald L. Miller
- www.ksd.uscourts.gov

The United States District Court for the District of Kansas (in case citations, D. Kan.) is the federal district court whose jurisdiction is the state of Kansas. The Court operates out of the Robert J. Dole United States Courthouse in Kansas City, Kansas, the Frank Carlson Federal Building in Topeka, and the United States Courthouse in Wichita. The District of Kansas was created in 1861, replacing the territorial court that preceded it, and President Abraham Lincoln appointed Archibald Williams as the Court's first judge.

Appeals from the District of Kansas are made to the United States Court of Appeals for the Tenth Circuit (except for patent claims and claims against the U.S. government under the Tucker Act, which are appealed to the Federal Circuit).

As of July 31, 2025 the United States attorney is Ryan Kriegshauser. On March 12, 2015, Ronald L. Miller, most recently police chief of Topeka, Kansas, was confirmed as U.S. Marshal.

The clerk of court is Skyler B. O'Hara, who is located in Topeka.

== Current judges ==
As of June 18, 2026:

#	Title	Judge	Duty station	Born	Term of service			Appointed by
#	Title	Judge	Duty station	Born	Active	Chief	Senior	Appointed by
29	Chief Judge	John W. Broomes	Wichita	1969	2018–present	2025–present	—	Trump
30	District Judge	Holly Teeter	Kansas City	1979	2018–present	—	—	Trump
31	District Judge	Toby Crouse	Kansas City	1975	2020–present	—	—	Trump
32	District Judge	Anthony J. Powell	Wichita	1962	2026–present (Note: Despite identical commission dates, Judges Powell, Mattivi and Kuhlman are organized chronologically by virtue of seniority of age.)	—	—	Trump
33	District Judge	Tony Mattivi	Topeka	1964	2026–present	—	—	Trump
34	District Judge	Jeffrey M. Kuhlman	Wichita	1989	2026–present	—	—	Trump
21	Senior Judge	John Lungstrum	Kansas City	1945	1991–2010	2001–2007	2010–present	G.H.W. Bush
22	Senior Judge	Monti Belot	inactive	1943	1991–2008	—	2008–present	G.H.W. Bush
23	Senior Judge	Kathryn H. Vratil	Kansas City	1949	1992–2014	2008–2014	2014–present	G.H.W. Bush
26	Senior Judge	Julie A. Robinson	Kansas City	1957	2001–2022	2017–2021	2022–present	G.W. Bush
27	Senior Judge	Eric F. Melgren	Wichita	1956	2008–2025	2021–2025	2025–present	G.W. Bush
28	Senior Judge	Daniel D. Crabtree	Kansas City	1956	2014–2025	—	2025–present	Obama

== Former judges ==
#	Judge	Born–died	Active service	Chief Judge	Senior status	Appointed by	Reason for termination
1	Archibald Williams	1801–1863	1861–1863	—	—	Lincoln	death
2	Mark W. Delahay	1828–1879	1863–1873 (Note: Recess appointment; formally nominated on December 14, 1863, confirmed by the United States Senate on March 15, 1864, and received commission the same day.)	—	—	Lincoln	resignation
3	Cassius Gaius Foster	1837–1899	1874–1899	—	—	Grant	retirement
4	William Cather Hook	1857–1921	1899–1903	—	—	McKinley	elevation
5	John Calvin Pollock	1857–1937	1903–1937	—	—	T. Roosevelt	death
6	George McDermott	1886–1937	1928–1929	—	—	Coolidge	elevation
7	Richard Joseph Hopkins	1873–1943	1929–1943	—	—	Hoover	death
8	Guy T. Helvering	1878–1946	1943–1946	—	—	F. Roosevelt	death
9	Arthur Johnson Mellott	1888–1957	1945–1957	1948–1957	—	Truman	death
10	Delmas Carl Hill	1906–1989	1949–1961 (Note: Recess appointment; formally nominated on January 5, 1950, confirmed by the Senate on March 8, 1950, and received commission on March 9, 1950.)	1957–1961	—	Truman	elevation
11	Arthur Jehu Stanley Jr.	1901–2001	1958–1971	1961–1971	1971–2001	Eisenhower	death
12	Wesley E. Brown	1907–2012	1962–1979	1971–1977	1979–2012	Kennedy	death
13	Henry George Templar	1904–1988	1962–1974	—	1974–1988	Kennedy	death
14	Frank Gordon Theis	1911–1998	1967–1981	1977–1981	1981–1998	L. Johnson	death
15	Earl Eugene O'Connor	1922–1998	1971–1992	1981–1992	1992–1998	Nixon	death
16	Richard Dean Rogers	1921–2016	1975–1989	—	1989–2016	Ford	death
17	Dale E. Saffels	1921–2002	1979–1990	—	1990–2002	Carter	death
18	Patrick F. Kelly	1929–2007	1980–1995	1992–1995	1995–1996	Carter	retirement
19	Sam A. Crow	1926–2022	1981–1996	—	1996–2022	Reagan	death
20	George Van Bebber	1931–2005	1989–2000	1995–2000	2000–2005	G.H.W. Bush	death
24	J. Thomas Marten	1951–present	1996–2017	2014–2017	2017–2021	Clinton	retirement
25	Carlos Murguia	1957–present	1999–2020	—	—	Clinton	resignation

== Chief judges ==
Chief judges have administrative responsibilities with respect to their district court. Unlike the Supreme Court, where one justice is specifically nominated to be chief, the office of chief judge rotates among the district court judges. To be chief, a judge must have been in active service on the court for at least one year, be under the age of 65, and have not previously served as chief judge.

A vacancy is filled by the judge highest in seniority among the group of qualified judges. The chief judge serves for a term of seven years, or until age 70, whichever occurs first. The age restrictions are waived if no members of the court would otherwise be qualified for the position.

When the office was created in 1948, the chief judge was the longest-serving judge who had not elected to retire, on what has since 1958 been known as senior status, or declined to serve as chief judge. After August 6, 1959, judges could not become or remain chief after turning 70 years old. The current rules have been in operation since October 1, 1982.

== Succession of seats ==
Seat 1
Seat established on January 29, 1861 by 12 Stat. 126
Williams	1861–1863
Delahay	1864–1873
Foster	1874–1899
Hook	1899–1903
Pollock	1903–1937
Seat abolished on January 24, 1937 (temporary judgeship expired)

Seat 2
Seat established on January 7, 1928 pursuant to 40 Stat. 1156 (temporary)
McDermott	1928–1929
Hopkins	1929–1943
Seat became permanent upon the abolition of Seat 1 on January 24, 1937
Helvering	1943–1946
Seat abolished on July 4, 1946 (temporary judgeship expired)

Seat 3
Seat established on October 16, 1945 by 59 Stat. 545 (temporary)
Seat became permanent upon the abolition of Seat 2 on July 4, 1946
Mellott	1945–1957
Stanley, Jr.	1958–1971
O'Connor	1971–1992
Vratil	1992–2014
Teeter	2018–present

Seat 4
Seat established on August 3, 1949 by 63 Stat. 493
Hill	1950–1961
Brown	1962–1979
Kelly	1980–1995
Marten	1996–2017
Broomes	2018–present

Seat 5
Seat established on May 19, 1961 by 75 Stat. 80
Templar	1962–1974
Rogers	1975–1989
Van Bebber	1989–2000
Robinson	2001–2022
Powell	2026–present

Seat 6
Seat established on March 18, 1966 by 80 Stat. 75 (temporary)
Seat made permanent on June 2, 1970 by 84 Stat. 294
Theis	1967–1981
Crow	1981–1996
Murguia	1999–2020
Crouse	2020–present

Seat 7
Seat established on October 20, 1978 by 92 Stat. 1629
Saffels	1979–1990
Lungstrum	1991–2010
Crabtree	2014–2025
Mattivi	2026–present

Seat 8
Seat established on December 1, 1990 by 104 Stat. 5089 (temporary)
Belot	1991–2008
Seat made permanent on December 23, 2024 by 138 Stat. 2693
Melgren	2008–2025
Kuhlman	2026–present

== U.S. Attorneys ==
- Andrew Jackson Isacks 1854-57
- William Weer 1857-58
- Alson C. Davis 1858-61
- Thomas Means 1861
- John T. Burris 1861
- Robert Crozier 1861-64
- James S. Emory 1864-67
- Samuel Riggs 1867-69
- Albert H. Horton 1869-73
- Cyrus I. Scofield 1873
- George R. Peck 1874-79
- James R. Hallowell 1879-85
- William C. Perry 1885-89
- Joseph W. Ady 1889-93
- William C. Perry 1893-97
- Isaac E. Lambert 1897-1901
- John S. Dean 1901-05
- Harry J. Bone 1905-13
- Fred Robertson 1913-21
- Albert F. Williams 1921-30
- Sardius M. Brewster 1930-34
- Summerfield S. Alexander 1934-42
- George H. West 1942-45
- Randolph Carpenter 1945-48
- Lester Luther 1948-52
- Eugene W. Davis 1952-53
- George Templar 1953-54
- William C. Farmer 1954-58
- William C. Leonard 1958-61
- Newell A. George 1961-68
- Benjamin E. Franklin 1968-69
- Robert J. Roth 1969-75
- E. Edward Johnson 1975-77
- James P. Buchele 1977-81
- Jim J. Marquez 1981-84
- Benjamin L. Burgess, Jr. 1984-90
- Lee Thompson 1990-93
- Jackie N. Williams 1993
- Randy Rathbun 1993-96
- Jackie N. Williams 1996-2001
- Eric Melgren 2002-2008
- Marietta Parker 2008-2009
- Lanny Welch (acting) 2009-2010
- Barry Grissom 2010-2016
- Stephen McAllister 2018-2021
- Duston J. Slinkard (acting) 2021-2023
- Kate E. Brubacher 2023-2025
- Duston J. Slinkard (acting) 2025
- Ryan A. Kriegshauser 2025-Present

== See also ==
- Courts of Kansas
- List of current United States district judges
- List of United States federal courthouses in Kansas
