= John Calvin Pollock =

American judge (1857–1937)

Judge of the United States District Court for the District of Kansas
- In office December 1, 1903 – January 24, 1937
- Appointed by: Theodore Roosevelt
- Preceded by: William Cather Hook
- Succeeded by: Seat abolished

Personal details
- Born: John Calvin Pollock; October 5, 1857 Belmont County, Ohio, U.S.
- Died: January 24, 1937 (aged 79)
- Education: Franklin College (A.B.) read law

John Calvin Pollock (October 5, 1857 – January 24, 1937) was a United States district judge of the United States District Court for the District of Kansas.

== Education and career ==
Born in Belmont County, Ohio, Pollock received an Artium Baccalaureus degree from Franklin College in 1882 and read law to enter the bar in 1884. He was in private practice in Newton, Iowa from 1884 to 1885, then in Hartsville, Missouri until 1886, and then in Winfield, Kansas until 1901. He was a justice of the Supreme Court of Kansas from 1901 to 1903.

== Federal judicial service ==
Pollock was nominated by President Theodore Roosevelt on November 25, 1903, to a seat on the United States District Court for the District of Kansas vacated by Judge William Cather Hook. He was confirmed by the United States Senate on December 1, 1903, and received his commission the same day. On January 7, 1928, President Calvin Coolidge certified Pollock involuntarily as disabled in accordance with the act of February 25, 1919, 40 Stat. 1156, which entitled the president to appoint an additional judge for the court and provided that no successor to the judge certified as disabled be appointed. George Thomas McDermott was appointed to the additional judgeship. Pollock's service terminated on January 24, 1937, due to his death.

== In popular culture ==
In the 2023 film Killers of the Flower Moon, directed by Martin Scorsese, Pollock was portrayed by actor Steve Eastin.

== See also ==
- List of United States federal judges by longevity of service

== Sources ==
Legal offices
Preceded by William Cather Hook	Judge of the United States District Court for the District of Kansas; 1903–1937	Succeeded by Seat abolished
