= Richard Joseph Hopkins =

American judge

Judge of the United States District Court for the District of Kansas
- In office December 19, 1929 – August 28, 1943
- Appointed by: Herbert Hoover
- Preceded by: George Thomas McDermott
- Succeeded by: Guy T. Helvering

Justice of the Kansas Supreme Court
- In office January 8, 1923 – December 27, 1929
- Preceded by: Silas Wright Porter
- Succeeded by: William D. Jochems

24th Kansas Attorney General
- In office January 13, 1919 – January 8, 1923
- Governor: Henry Justin Allen
- Preceded by: Sardius Mason Brewster
- Succeeded by: Charles Benjamin Griffith

19th Lieutenant Governor of Kansas
- In office January 9, 1911 – January 13, 1913
- Governor: Walter R. Stubbs
- Preceded by: William James Fitzgerald
- Succeeded by: Sheffield Ingalls

Personal details
- Born: April 4, 1873 Jefferson City, Missouri, US
- Died: August 28, 1943 (aged 70) Kansas City, Kansas, US
- Resting place: Highland Park Cemetery; Kansas City, Kansas
- Education: Northwestern University Pritzker School of Law (LL.B.)

Richard Joseph Hopkins (April 4, 1873 – August 28, 1943) was a justice of the Kansas Supreme Court and a United States district judge of the United States District Court for the District of Kansas.

== Education and career ==
Born in Jefferson City, Missouri, Hopkins received a Bachelor of Laws from Northwestern University Pritzker School of Law in 1901. He was in private practice in Chicago, Illinois, from 1901 to 1906, and in Garden City, Kansas, from 1906 to 1913. He was a member of the Kansas House of Representatives in 1909, and was thereafter the 19th Lieutenant Governor of Kansas, from 1911 to 1912 serving under Governor Walter R. Stubbs. Hopkins was a city attorney of Garden City from 1913 to 1918. He was the Kansas Attorney General from 1919 to 1923. He was a justice of the Kansas Supreme Court from 1923 to 1929.

== Federal judicial service ==
On October 17, 1929, Hopkins was nominated by President Herbert Hoover to a seat on the United States District Court for the District of Kansas vacated by Judge George Thomas McDermott. Hopkins was confirmed by the United States Senate on December 19, 1929, and received his commission the same day. Hopkins served in that capacity until his death on August 28, 1943, in Kansas City, Kansas.

== Sources ==
Political offices
Preceded by William James Fitzgerald	Lieutenant Governor of Kansas; 1911–1913	Succeeded by Sheffield Ingalls
Legal offices
Preceded by Sardius Mason Brewster	Attorney General of Kansas; 1919–1923	Succeeded by Charles Benjamin Griffith
Preceded by George Thomas McDermott	Judge of the United States District Court for the District of Kansas; 1929–1943	Succeeded by Guy T. Helvering
