= Ryan Kriegshauser =

US Attorney Kansas

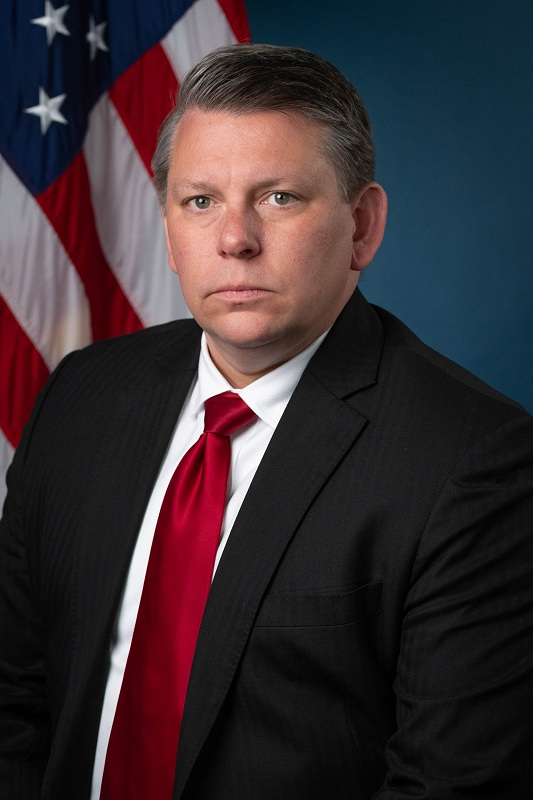

United States Attorney for the District of Kansas
- Incumbent
- Assumed office July 28, 2025; Interim: July 28, 2025 – December 18, 2025
- President: Donald Trump
- Preceded by: Kate E. Brubacher

Personal details
- Education: Georgetown University (BA) University of Missouri-Kansas City School of Law (JD)

Ryan Kriegshauser is an American lawyer who has served as the United States attorney for the District of Kansas since July 2025.

== Early life, education, and military service ==
Ryan Kriegshauser grew up in Kansas. He graduated with a Bachelor of Arts from Georgetown University. Kriegshauser obtained his Juris Doctor from the University of Missouri at Kansas City School of Law. He also attended the University of Foreign Military and Cultural Studies, the Naval Justice School, and the Naval War College.

Kriegshauser has served in the military since 2006, when he enlisted in the United States Navy Reserve and deployed to Afghanistan in 2018. On July 1, 2025, Kriegshauser was promoted to commander. His military decorations include the Defense Meritorious Service Medal, Joint Service Commendation Medal, Joint Service Achievement Medal, as well as numerous awards, campaign ribbons, and service awards.

== Career ==
After law school, Kriegshauser practiced at Graves Bartle Marcus and Garrett, where he represented Anita Moncrief against the Association of Community Organizations for Reform Now and Project Vote. He primarily litigated constitutional claims, complex commercial litigation, and regulatory defense matters. In 2011, Kriegshauser became a Deputy Assistant Secretary of State at the Office of the Kansas Secretary of State, where he represented the State of Kansas in the 2012 redistricting lawsuit. He later served as a prosecutor at the Office of the Kansas Securities Commissioner and as a Deputy County Attorney for Jefferson County.

=== Kriegshauser Ney Law Group ===
Kriegshauser founded the Kriegshauser Ney Law Group with Joshua Ney, where he won campaign finance cases against the Kansas Governmental Ethics Commission and represented Topeka area Senator Rick Kloos in the Internal Revenue Service's church examination of God's Storehouse. He also was involved in other efforts challenging government decisions during the COVID-19 pandemic, in which the Kansas City Star's editorial board noted he had "remarkable success."

=== United States Attorney for the District of Kansas ===
Kriegshauser was nominated by President Donald J. Trump on July 16, 2025. In July 2025, Attorney General Pam Bondi appointed him interim United States Attorney for the District of Kansas. On November 20, 2025, Chief United States District Judge John Broomes extended his appointment indefinitely as the interim United States attorney for the District of Kansas while awaiting Senate confirmation. The same day, his nomination was favorably reported out of the Senate Judiciary Committee. He was confirmed by the United States Senate on December 18, 2025.
