= John Watson Lungstrum =

American judge (born 1945)

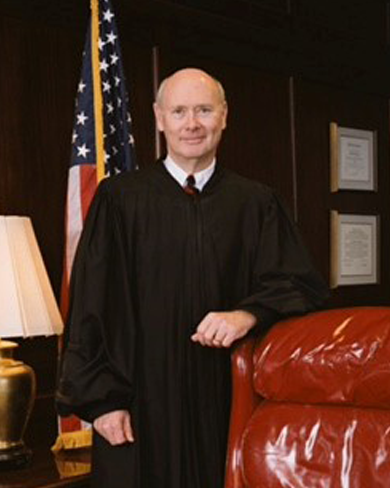

Senior Judge of the United States District Court for the District of Kansas
- Incumbent
- Assumed office November 2, 2010

Chief Judge of the United States District Court for the District of Kansas
- In office 2001–2007
- Preceded by: George Thomas Van Bebber
- Succeeded by: Kathryn H. Vratil

Judge of the United States District Court for the District of Kansas
- In office November 5, 1991 – November 2, 2010
- Appointed by: George H. W. Bush
- Preceded by: Dale E. Saffels
- Succeeded by: Daniel D. Crabtree

Personal details
- Born: 1945 (age 80–81) Topeka, Kansas, U.S.
- Education: Yale University (BA); University of Kansas (JD)

John Watson Lungstrum (born 1945) is a senior United States district judge of the United States District Court for the District of Kansas.

== Education and career ==
Lungstrum was born in Topeka, Kansas. He grew up in Kansas City, Missouri, where he graduated from the Pembroke Country-Day School in 1963. He received a Bachelor of Arts degree from Yale University in 1967 where he was a prominent leader of the Yale Political Union. He received a Juris Doctor from the University of Kansas School of Law in 1970. He practiced law in Los Angeles, California from 1970 to 1971, after which he served as a lieutenant in the United States Army from 1971 to 1972. He reentered private practice in Lawrence, Kansas from 1972 to 1991, during which time he was a lecturer at the University of Kansas School of Law.

=== Federal judicial service ===
On July 24, 1991, President George H. W. Bush nominated Lungstrum to be a United States district judge of the United States District Court for the District of Kansas, to fill the seat vacated by Judge Dale E. Saffels, who assumed senior status on November 16, 1990. The United States Senate confirmed Lungstrum's nomination on October 31, 1991, and he received his commission on November 5, 1991. From 2001 and 2007, he served as the chief judge. Lungstrum assumed senior status on November 2, 2010.

== Sources ==
Legal offices
Preceded by Dale E. Saffels	Judge of the United States District Court for the District of Kansas; 1991–2010	Succeeded by Daniel D. Crabtree
Preceded by George Thomas Van Bebber	Chief Judge of the United States District Court for the District of Kansas; 2001–2007	Succeeded by Kathryn H. Vratil
