= Jacob Trieber =

American judge (1853–1927)

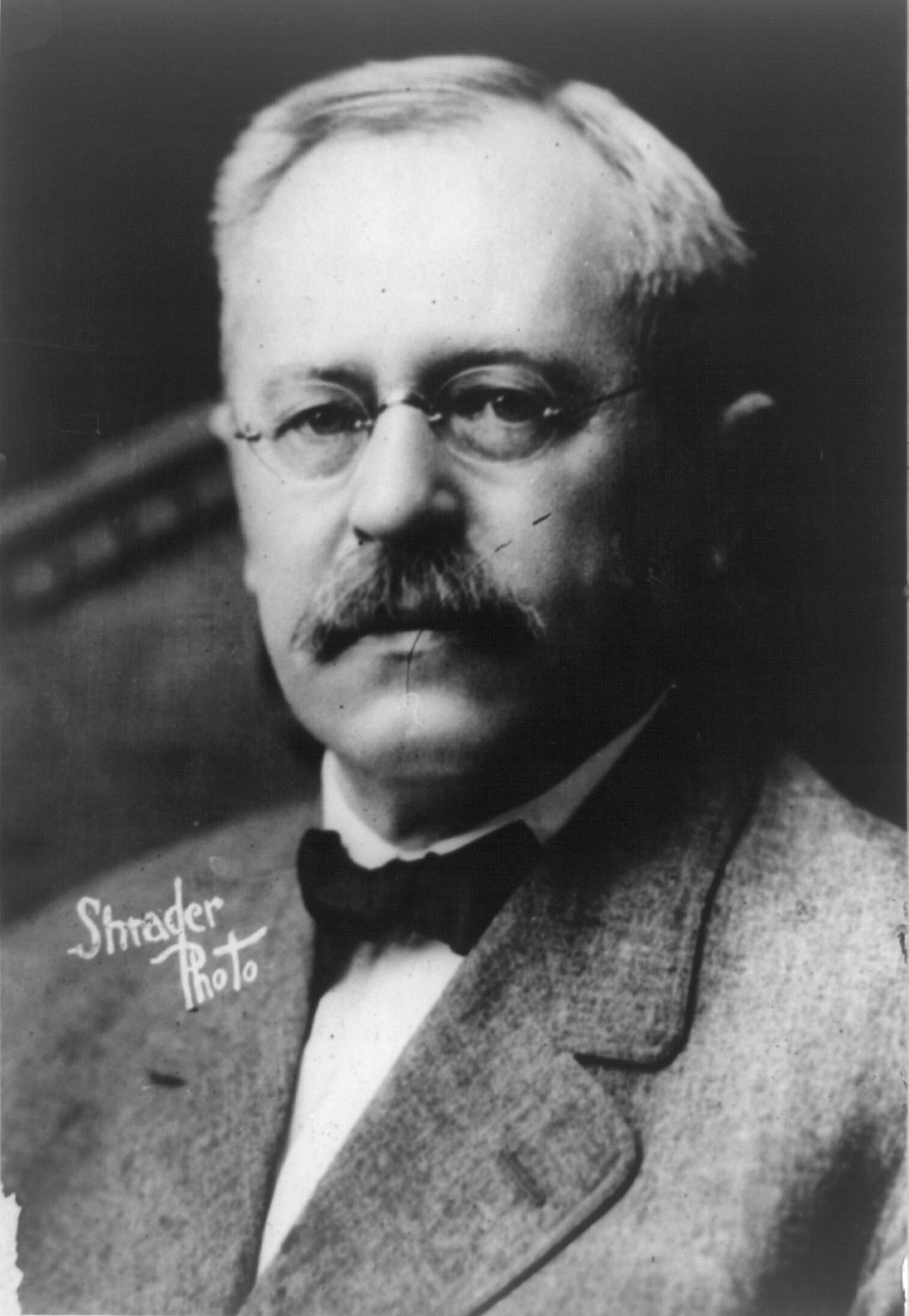
- Trieber in 1890

Judge of the United States District Court for the Eastern District of Arkansas
- In office July 26, 1900 – September 17, 1927
- Appointed by: William McKinley
- Preceded by: John A. Williams
- Succeeded by: John Ellis Martineau

Personal details
- Born: October 6, 1853 Raschkow, Kingdom of Prussia
- Died: September 17, 1927 (aged 73) Scarsdale, New York, U.S.
- Spouse(s): Ida Schradski, m.1872

Jacob Trieber (October 6, 1853 – September 17, 1927) was a United States district judge of the United States District Court for the Eastern District of Arkansas.

== Education and career ==
Born on October 6, 1853, in Raschkow, Kingdom of Prussia, Trieber read law under the supervision of Marshall L. Stephenson, a former justice of the Arkansas Supreme Court. Trieber and Stephenson formed a law partnership for a time, and after it ended, Trieber served as the United States Attorney for the Eastern District of Arkansas from 1897 to 1900.

== Federal judicial service ==
Trieber received a recess appointment from President William McKinley on July 26, 1900, to a seat on the United States District Court for the Eastern District of Arkansas vacated by Judge John A. Williams. He was nominated to the same position by President McKinley on December 4, 1900. He was confirmed by the United States Senate on January 9, 1901, and received his commission the same day. His service terminated due to his death at his daughter's home in Scarsdale, New York on September 17, 1927. During his tenure, Judge Trieber heard civil rights cases, and became unpopular in the white community for holding that federal law permitted protection of African Americans. Trieber was the first Jewish person to serve as a United States federal judge.

== Honor ==
In 2016, the federal courthouse in Helena–West Helena, Arkansas was renamed in Trieber's honor.

== See also ==
- List of first minority male lawyers and judges in the United States
- List of Jewish American jurists

== Sources ==
Legal offices
| Preceded by John A. Williams | Judge of the United States District Court for the Eastern District of Arkansas; 1900–1927 | Succeeded by John Ellis Martineau |
