= Daniel D. Crabtree =

American judge (born 1956)

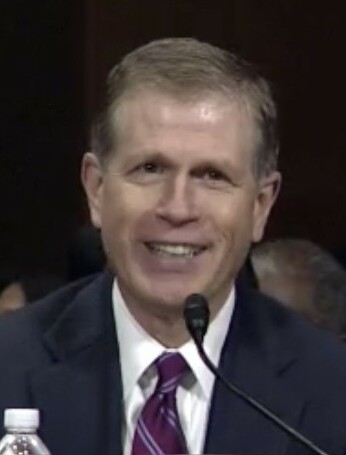
- Crabtree in 2013

Senior Judge of the United States District Court for the District of Kansas
- Incumbent
- Assumed office August 11, 2025

Judge of the United States District Court for the District of Kansas
- In office May 1, 2014 – August 11, 2025
- Appointed by: Barack Obama
- Preceded by: John Watson Lungstrum
- Succeeded by: Tony Mattivi

Personal details
- Born: Daniel Dale Crabtree; August 10, 1956 (age 69) Kansas City, Missouri, U.S.
- Education: Ottawa University (BA); University of Kansas (JD)

Daniel Dale Crabtree (born August 10, 1956) is a senior United States district judge of the United States District Court for the District of Kansas.

== Biography ==
Crabtree received a Bachelor of Arts degree in 1978 from Ottawa University. He received a Juris Doctor in 1981 from the University of Kansas School of Law. He has spent his entire law career at the law firm of Stinson Morrison Hecker LLP (now Stinson LLP) in Wichita, starting as an associate in 1981 and becoming a partner in 1988. He has represented businesses and governmental entities in complex civil litigation in federal and state courts. He also served as general counsel to the Kansas City Royals. He has also served as a member of the board of directors and executive committee of the Providence Medical Center and St. John Hospital.

=== Federal judicial service ===
On August 1, 2013, President Barack Obama nominated Crabtree to serve as a judge of the United States District Court for the District of Kansas, to the seat vacated by Judge John Watson Lungstrum, who assumed senior status on November 2, 2010. On January 16, 2014, his nomination was reported out of committee by a voice vote. On April 11, 2014, Senate Majority Leader Harry Reid filed a motion to invoke cloture on the nomination. On April 29, 2014, the United States Senate invoked cloture on his nomination by a 57–39 vote. On April 30, 2014, his nomination was confirmed by a 94–0 vote. He received his judicial commission on May 1, 2014. He assumed senior status on August 11, 2025.

Legal offices
Preceded by John Watson Lungstrum	Judge of the United States District Court for the District of Kansas; 2014–2025	Succeeded by Tony Mattivi
