= William Cather Hook =

American judge (1857–1921)

Judge of the United States Court of Appeals for the Eighth Circuit
- In office November 17, 1903 – August 11, 1921
- Appointed by: Theodore Roosevelt
- Preceded by: Henry Clay Caldwell
- Succeeded by: Robert E. Lewis

Judge of the United States Circuit Courts for the Eighth Circuit
- In office November 17, 1903 – December 31, 1911
- Appointed by: Theodore Roosevelt
- Preceded by: Henry Clay Caldwell
- Succeeded by: Seat abolished

Judge of the United States District Court for the District of Kansas
- In office January 31, 1899 – December 1, 1903
- Appointed by: William McKinley
- Preceded by: Cassius Gaius Foster
- Succeeded by: John Calvin Pollock

Personal details
- Born: William Cather Hook; September 24, 1857 Waynesburg, Pennsylvania, U.S.
- Died: August 11, 1921 (aged 63) Sayner, Wisconsin, U.S.
- Education: Washington University in St. Louis (LLB)

William Cather Hook (September 24, 1857 – August 11, 1921) was a United States circuit judge of the United States Court of Appeals for the Eighth Circuit and of the United States Circuit Courts for the Eighth Circuit and previously was a United States district judge of the United States District Court for the District of Kansas.

== Education and career ==
Born on September 24, 1857, in Waynesburg, Pennsylvania, Hook received a Bachelor of Laws in 1878 from the Washington University School of Law. He entered private practice in Leavenworth, Kansas from 1878 to 1899. He was city attorney for Leavenworth. He was city legal adviser for Leavenworth from 1889 to 1895.

== Federal judicial service ==
=== District Court service ===
Hook was nominated by President William McKinley on January 28, 1899, to a seat on the United States District Court for the District of Kansas vacated by Judge Cassius Gaius Foster. Hook's nomination was opposed by railroad companies, who were displeased that Hook had successfully won judgments against them while in private practice. Nevertheless, he was confirmed by the United States Senate on January 31, 1899, and received his commission the same day. His service terminated on December 1, 1903, due to his elevation to the Eighth Circuit.

=== Court of Appeals service ===
Hook was nominated by President Theodore Roosevelt on November 10, 1903, to a joint seat on the United States Court of Appeals for the Eighth Circuit and the United States Circuit Courts for the Eighth Circuit vacated by Judge Henry Clay Caldwell. He was confirmed by the Senate on November 17, 1903, and received his commission the same day. On December 31, 1911, the Circuit Courts were abolished and he thereafter served only on the Court of Appeals. His service terminated on August 11, 1921, due to his death in Sayner, Wisconsin.

== Failed consideration for the Supreme Court ==
On February 6, 1912, President William Howard Taft announced that he would nominate Hook to fill the vacancy on the United States Supreme Court that had been caused by the death of Justice John Marshall Harlan. Opposition was raised, however, by leaders of the NAACP, the Washington Bee, and other African-American newspapers and organizations. Concerned parties discussed Hook's decision in upholding the constitutionality of an Oklahoma Jim Crow law discriminating against African American passengers on trains crossing the state line between Kansas and Oklahoma. The railroad interests also continued their opposition to Hook, as did large corporations displeased with his rulings in antitrust cases. A prominent critic of the nomination was Governor of Nebraska Chester Hardy Aldrich. Mahlon Pitney was selected by the President in place of Hook.

== Sources ==
Legal offices
Preceded by Cassius Gaius Foster	Judge of the United States District Court for the District of Kansas; 1899–1903	Succeeded by John Calvin Pollock
Preceded by Henry Clay Caldwell	Judge of the United States Circuit Courts for the Eighth Circuit; 1903–1911	Succeeded by Seat abolished
Preceded by Henry Clay Caldwell	Judge of the United States Court of Appeals for the Eighth Circuit; 1903–1921	Succeeded by Robert E. Lewis
