= Toby Crouse =

American judge (born 1975)

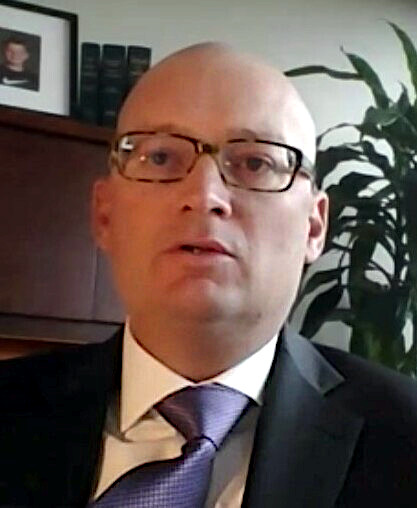

Judge of the United States District Court for the District of Kansas
- Incumbent
- Assumed office December 2, 2020
- Appointed by: Donald Trump
- Preceded by: Carlos Murguia

Solicitor General of Kansas
- In office January 26, 2018 – December 2, 2020
- Attorney General: Derek Schmidt
- Preceded by: Stephen McAllister
- Succeeded by: Brant Laue

Personal details
- Born: 1975 (age 49–50) McPherson, Kansas, U.S.
- Education: Kansas State University (BS); University of Kansas (JD)

Toby Jon Crouse (born 1975) is a United States district judge of the United States District Court for the District of Kansas. He was formerly the Solicitor General of Kansas from 2018 to 2020.

== Biography ==
Crouse graduated from Kansas State University in 1997 with a Bachelor of Science. He then attended the University of Kansas School of Law, where he was an articles editor of the Kansas Law Review. He graduated in 2000 with a Juris Doctor and was inducted into the Order of the Coif.

Crouse began his career as a law clerk to Judge Monti Belot of the United States District Court for the District of Kansas and Judge Mary Beck Briscoe of the United States Court of Appeals for the Tenth Circuit. He then worked as Special Counsel at the law firm Foulston Siefkin in their Overland Park office. Crouse has been a member of the Federalist Society since 2019.

Crouse served as Solicitor General of Kansas from January 2018 to December 2020. As Solicitor General, he argued and won two cases before the Supreme Court of the United States. Those cases are Kahler v. Kansas and Kansas v. Glover. He left the Kansas Attorney General's office after his appointment to the bench.

=== Federal judicial service ===
On May 7, 2020, President Donald Trump announced his intent to nominate Crouse to serve as a United States district judge of the United States District Court for the District of Kansas. On May 21, 2020, his nomination was sent to the United States Senate. Crouse was nominated to the seat vacated by Judge Carlos Murguia, who resigned on April 1, 2020. A hearing on his nomination before the Senate Judiciary Committee was held on July 29, 2020. On September 17, 2020, his nomination was reported out of committee by a 12–10 vote. On November 17, 2020, the United States Senate invoked cloture on his nomination by a 51–44 vote. Later that day, his nomination was confirmed by a 50–43 vote. He received his judicial commission on December 2, 2020.

Legal offices
Preceded by Stephen McAllister	Solicitor General of Kansas; 2018–2020	Succeeded by Brant Laue
Preceded by Carlos Murguia	Judge of the United States District Court for the District of Kansas; 2020–present	Incumbent
