= Henry Clay Caldwell =

American judge (1832–1915)

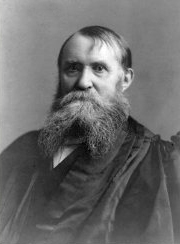

Judge of the United States Court of Appeals for the Eighth Circuit
- In office June 16, 1891 – June 4, 1903
- Appointed by: operation of law
- Preceded by: Seat established by 26 Stat. 826
- Succeeded by: William Cather Hook

Judge of the United States Circuit Courts for the Eighth Circuit
- In office March 4, 1890 – June 4, 1903
- Appointed by: Benjamin Harrison
- Preceded by: David Josiah Brewer
- Succeeded by: William Cather Hook

Judge of the United States District Court for the Eastern District of Arkansas
- In office June 20, 1864 – March 13, 1890
- Appointed by: Abraham Lincoln
- Preceded by: Daniel Ringo
- Succeeded by: John A. Williams

Judge of the United States District Court for the Western District of Arkansas
- In office June 20, 1864 – March 3, 1871
- Appointed by: Abraham Lincoln
- Preceded by: Daniel Ringo
- Succeeded by: Seat abolished

Member of the Iowa House of Representatives
- In office 1859–1861

Personal details
- Born: Henry Clay Caldwell; September 4, 1832 Marshall County, Virginia, U.S.
- Died: February 15, 1915 (aged 82) Los Angeles, California, U.S.
- Education: Read law

Henry Clay Caldwell (September 4, 1832 – February 15, 1915) was a United States district judge of the United States District Court for the Eastern District of Arkansas and the United States District Court for the Western District of Arkansas and later was a United States Circuit Judge of the United States Court of Appeals for the Eighth Circuit and of the United States Circuit Courts for the Eighth Circuit.

== Education and career ==
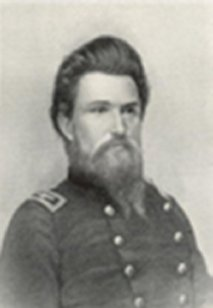
Col. Henry Clay Caldwell of the 3rd Iowa Volunteer Cavalry

Born on September 4, 1832, in Marshall County, Virginia (now West Virginia), Caldwell read law in 1851. He entered private practice in Keosauqua, Iowa from 1852 to 1856. He was prosecutor for Van Buren County, Iowa from 1856 to 1858. He was a member of the Iowa House of Representatives from 1859 to 1861. He served in the United States Army from 1861 to 1864, during the American Civil War. As a Colonel he commanded the 3rd Iowa Volunteer Cavalry Regiment that fought against Colonel Joseph C. Porter who was commanding the 1st Northeast Missouri Cavalry.

== Federal judicial service ==
Caldwell was nominated by President Abraham Lincoln on May 2, 1864, to a joint seat on the United States District Court for the Eastern District of Arkansas and the United States District Court for the Western District of Arkansas vacated by Judge Daniel Ringo. He was confirmed by the United States Senate on May 28, 1864, and received his commission on June 20, 1864. On March 3, 1871, Caldwell was reassigned by operation of law to serve only in the Eastern District. His service terminated on March 13, 1890, due to his elevation to the Eighth Circuit.

Caldwell was nominated by President Benjamin Harrison on February 27, 1890, to a seat on the United States Circuit Courts for the Eighth Circuit vacated by Judge David Josiah Brewer. He was confirmed by the Senate on March 4, 1890, and received his commission the same day. Caldwell was assigned by operation of law to additional and concurrent service on the United States Court of Appeals for the Eighth Circuit on June 16, 1891, to a new seat authorized by 26 Stat. 826 (Evarts Act). His service terminated on June 4, 1903, due to his retirement.

== Death ==
Caldwell died on February 15, 1915, in Los Angeles, California.

== See also ==
- List of United States federal judges by longevity of service

== Works ==
- "Railroad Receiverships in the Federal Courts of the United States: Remarks of the Hon. Henry C. Caldwell before the Greenleaf Club." St. Louis, 1896.
- "Trial by Judge and Jury." American Federationist, vol. 17 (May 1910), pp. 385–389.

== Sources ==
- Appleton's Cyclopedia of American Biography, 1888
- Harper's Weekly, January 1864
- Joseph A. Mudd, With Porter in Northeast Missouri (1909)
- Richard S. Arnold, George C. Freeman, III JUDGE HENRY CLAY CALDWELL 23 U. Ark. Little Rock L. Rev. 317 Winter, 2001
- "The Political Graveyard: Index to Politicians: Caldwell". politicalgraveyard.com.
- Scott, Henry Wilson (April 15, 1891). "Distinguished American Lawyers: With Their Struggles and Triumphs in the Forum ..." C.L. Webster. pp. 115–116 – via Google Books.

Legal offices
Preceded by Daniel Ringo	Judge of the United States District Court for the Western District of Arkansas; 1864–1871	Succeeded by Seat abolished
Preceded by Daniel Ringo	Judge of the United States District Court for the Eastern District of Arkansas; 1864–1890	Succeeded by John A. Williams
Preceded by David Josiah Brewer	Judge of the United States Circuit Courts for the Eighth Circuit; 1890–1903	Succeeded by William Cather Hook
Preceded by Seat established by 26 Stat. 826	Judge of the United States Court of Appeals for the Eighth Circuit; 1891–1903	Succeeded by William Cather Hook
