= Archibald Williams (judge) =

American judge

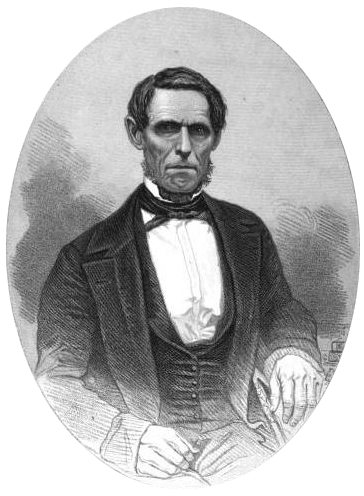

Judge of the United States District Court for the District of Kansas
- In office March 12, 1861 – September 21, 1863
- Appointed by: Abraham Lincoln
- Preceded by: Seat established by 12 Stat. 126
- Succeeded by: Mark W. Delahay

Personal details
- Born: Archibald Williams; June 10, 1801 Montgomery County, Kentucky
- Died: September 21, 1863 (aged 62) Quincy, Illinois
- Resting place: Woodland Cemetery; Quincy, Illinois
- Party: Whig; Republican
- Education: read law

Archibald Williams (June 10, 1801 – September 21, 1863) was a United States district judge of the United States District Court for the District of Kansas. Williams was a friend and political ally of President Abraham Lincoln.

== Education and career ==
Born in Montgomery County, Kentucky, the son of John Williams and Amelia Gill Williams, Williams read law to enter the bar in 1828. In 1829, he entered private practice in Quincy, Illinois. For several months in early 1832, he served as a volunteer in the Black Hawk War against Native Americans. In the fall of 1832, he supported Henry Clay for President of the United States. He was the United States Attorney for the District of Illinois from 1849 to 1853. He served in both the Illinois House of Representatives and the Illinois Senate.

=== State senate service ===
While in the Illinois Senate, Williams studied and reported on School Financing to the Senate, arguing for local control of schools rather than establishing a statewide system. Later in his legislative career, he labeled the Illinois Internal Improvements program "Infernal Improvements" due to its financial difficulties leading to bankruptcy.

=== Service as United States Attorney and Fugitive Slave Act ===
As the United States Attorney for Illinois, it was Williams's job to prosecute cases in the United States District Court. The job became more difficult for Williams in 1850 when Congress enacted the Compromise of 1850, which included a new Fugitive Slave Law. This law required Williams, in his role as United States Attorney, to oversee the capture of runaway slaves and their return to their owners in the South. Williams was opposed to slavery personally but, in the 1850s, acknowledged the right of slave owners in the South to keep their slaves. He fully discharged his duties under the Fugitive Slave Act.

== Federal judicial service ==
On March 8, 1861, Williams was nominated by President Abraham Lincoln to a new seat on the United States District Court for the District of Kansas created by 12 Stat. 126. He was confirmed by the United States Senate on March 12, 1861, and received his commission the same day. Williams served in that capacity until his death in Quincy on September 21, 1863.

Williams was the first person to hold the office of United States District Judge in Kansas, Kansas itself having just achieved statehood. Williams moved to Topeka, Kansas, the state capital, where he served more than two years as Judge. He moved back to Quincy shortly before his death.

=== Notable cases ===
During his tenure as the United States District Judge for Kansas, Williams worked on such issues as building a branch of the transcontinental railroad across Kansas, fair treatment of Native Americans in railroad matters, and the loyalty to the Union cause of a United States Army officer stationed in Kansas.

=== Last call on Lincoln ===
While still serving in Kansas, Williams traveled to Washington, D.C., and, on May 29, 1862, paid a last visit to his old friend Lincoln in the White House.

== Relationship with Lincoln ==
Lincoln was elected to the state legislature in 1834. Williams and Lincoln became good friends and both subsequently joined the Whig Party. Lincoln was said to have seen Williams as a great "reasoner." The two men were described as "sitting next to each other in the southeast corner of the statehouse." It was noted: "Lincoln did not hesitate to consult Williams at all times, and the two men were often associated in legal work."

Williams ran for the United States Senate as a Whig in 1836 and in 1842. At those times the selection of United States Senators was made by both houses of the state legislature. Lincoln voted for Williams the first time he ran for United States Senator in 1836. The second time Williams ran, in 1842, Lincoln was no longer in the state legislature and thus could not vote for his friend. In both instances, Williams was not elected.

Lincoln was admitted to practice law in the United States Circuit Court on December 3, 1839. United States District Judge Nathaniel Pope presided over the ceremony. A Quincy newspaper noted that Williams was present at the ceremony.

Williams presided over a Whig Party state convention meeting in Springfield, Illinois, in 1843. Lincoln attended the convention and was elected a Whig Party presidential elector for the 1844 presidential election. Unfortunately for the Whigs, Democrat James K. Polk of Tennessee won the presidential election.

In June 1844, Williams was elected president of an Illinois state Whig Party convention in Peoria, Illinois. Lincoln spoke to the convention in support of the United States charging higher tariffs on imported goods, a major Whig position at the time.

Along with Lincoln, Williams in the 1840s supported the African colonization of freed slaves by joining the Illinois colonization society. Although opposed to slavery, both men believed Southerners should be allowed to keep their slaves but also should be urged to free their slaves voluntarily and return them to Africa. This was thought to be a reasonable and non-coercive solution to the slavery problem.

=== 1848 election ===
In the 1848 presidential election, Lincoln was backing General Zachary Taylor, a Mexican War hero, for the Whig Party nomination. A problem developed when Orville H. Browning, a Whig Party leader in Quincy supported the nomination of past Whig Party favorite Henry Clay. On April 30, 1848, Lincoln wrote a letter to Williams urging him to support Zachary Taylor and, if possible, also enlist the support of Browning.

Washington, April 30, 1848

Dear Williams,

I have not seen in the papers any evidence of a movement to send a delegate from your circuit to the June convention—I wish to say that I think it all important that a delegate should be sent—Mr. Clay's chance for election is just no chance at all. He might get New York, and that would have elected in 1844 but it will not now; because he must now at the least, have Tennessee, which he had then and, in addition, the fifteen new votes of Florida, Texas, Iowa, and Wisconsin. I know that our good friend Browning is a great admirer of Mr. Clay, and I therefore fear he is favoring his nomination. If he is, ask him to discard feeling, and try if he can possibly, as a matter of judgement, count the votes necessary to elect him.

In my judgment, we can elect nobody but Gen. Taylor, and we cannot elect him without a nomination—Therefore don't fail to send a delegation—

Your friend as ever,

A. Lincoln

This letter demonstrates the close friendship and easygoing familiarity between Lincoln and Williams. It also reveals Lincoln's developing skills as an up-and-coming Illinois politician. It is not known whether Williams prevailed on Orville Browning to support Zachary Taylor for the Whig nomination for president in 1848.

Once in the White House in Washington, D.C., newly elected President Zachary Taylor appointed Williams the United States District Attorney for the state of Illinois. Lincoln had sent the following letter in support of Williams's nomination:

Washington, March 8, 1849

Hon: John M. Clayton

Secretary of State

Dear Sir:

We Recommend that Archibald Williams, of Quincy, Illinois, be appointed U.S. District Attorney for the District of Illinois, when that office shall become vacant.

Your Obt. Servts.

A. Lincoln

== The Mormon Problem in Illinois ==
Joining with his friend and fellow Quincy lawyer Orville Browning, Williams in 1841 helped to defend Mormon leader Joseph Smith from being extradited to Missouri to face possible execution for alleged crimes. Joseph Smith was the founder of the Latter Day Saints movement (Mormons), and he and his church were unpopular because of the voting power of his supporters and their belief in men having multiple wives. Thanks to Browning's and Williams's arguments in court, Smith was not extradited to Missouri but remained in Illinois and founded a Mormon colony at Nauvoo, Illinois.

Four years later, in 1844, Smith and his brother Hyrum were murdered by a mob while incarcerated in the jail at Carthage, Illinois. Williams and Browning switched sides and helped to defend in court the accused murderers of Joseph and Hyrum Smith. The defendants were all found not-guilty.

Shortly afterward, Williams chaired a meeting in Quincy that sought to arrange for a peaceful departure of the Mormons from Illinois to the far western Utah Territory. Williams appointed a delegation of Quincy citizens that traveled to Nauvoo and convinced the new Mormon leader, Brigham Young, to leave Illinois for Utah in an orderly manner. Brigham Young said the Mormons could not leave immediately, but when "grass grows and water runs," both signs of spring. The following spring the Mormons peacefully left Illinois for Utah, traveling mainly by wagon train.

== The Illinois Constitutional Convention of 1847 ==
Williams was elected to the Illinois Constitutional Convention of 1847 as a Whig. The convention met in the state capitol in Springfield and proceeded to write an improved state constitution. Williams was elected in a Democratic district against a Democratic candidate. Although the Democrats had a majority of the delegates to the convention, the Whigs could break away Democratic votes when they needed them and ended up dominating the convention. A historian noted: "James W. Singleton of Mount Sterling, Archibald Williams of Quincy, and David M. Woodson of Carrollton aggressively upheld the Whig cause against the attacks of various capable Democratic opponents."

At the constitutional convention, Williams and the Whig Party supported the rights of property, strict voting requirements in state elections, and allowing the state legislature to override the governor's veto by a majority vote rather than a two-thirds vote. Two issues were sent to the state's voters—one calling for the creation of an Illinois state bank and the other limiting the immigration into Illinois of freed slaves from the slave states. The voters of Illinois rejected the idea of an Illinois state bank but approved limiting the immigration of freed slaves.

Williams gave a major speech at the constitutional convention opposing the idea that the Illinois Supreme Court should meet at various locations throughout the state rather than only in the state capital of Springfield. After the constitutional convention adjourned, the voters of Illinois approved the new constitution by a ratio of almost 4 to 1.

The Constitutional Convention of 1847 was a landmark in the legal and political career of Williams. He succeeded in furthering the ideals and policies of the Whig Party against stiff Democratic Party opposition. He was three months in Springfield, the state capital, meeting and working with many of the leading politicians and government officials from throughout the state. It helped to make him a significant figure in Illinois political and governmental history.

== Anti-Nebraska movement and William's failed run for Congress ==
In the early 1850s, United States Senator Stephen Douglas of Illinois sought the adoption of the Kansas-Nebraska Act. The bill provided for Kansas and Nebraska to become territories with provision for "popular sovereignty," the idea that the citizens of each new territory would be allowed to vote on whether the territory should be slave or free. This produced a sharp reaction on the part of those opposed to slavery in the territories, because the Missouri Compromise of 1820 had stated that the lands that comprised Kansas and Nebraska should be free territory, not slave territory.

The result was the anti-Nebraska movement, which opposed popular sovereignty for Nebraska on the grounds that the citizens of the territory might vote for slavery and thereby spread slavery further into the territories. Williams and Lincoln both became anti-Nebraska men. For his part, Williams ran for the United States House of Representatives in 1854 on a strong anti-Nebraska platform.

Williams was running against incumbent Democratic Representative William Alexander Richardson, a formidable opponent. The United States House district that comprised Quincy was strongly Democratic. On the other hand, Richardson was a close political ally of Stephen Douglas and had strongly backed popular sovereignty for Nebraska in the United States House. Williams and his supporters hoped the wave of anti-Nebraska sentiment sweeping the northern states might just be strong enough to defeat Richardson, despite the strong Democratic voting tendency of the House district.

On October 31, 1854, Lincoln arrived in Quincy to give a speech in support of Williams's candidacy for the United States House of Representatives. It took two days for him to travel by railroad and stagecoach to Quincy. In a letter to a friend and political ally, Lincoln wrote: "I am here now going to Quincy, to try to give Mr. [Archibald] Williams a little life."

Even with Lincoln's help, Williams lost the election to William Richardson. The overall election was a success for the anti-Nebraska movement, however, as the anti-Nebraska forces won enough seats to gain a majority in the United States House of Representatives. After 1854, Williams and Lincoln and other anti-Nebraskans took the lead in forming the Republican Party in Illinois around the issue of "no slavery in the territories."

Lincoln wrote a letter in which he said he was ready to "fuse" with other anti-slavery groups according to "principles" adopted at a public meeting in Quincy. The purpose of fusion was to bring many disparate anti-slavery groups together to form the Republican Party. Lincoln's letter noted that the principles had been drawn up by a three-person committee led "by Mr. Archibald Williams." The principles centered on the idea that Southern slave owners could keep their slaves but that slavery would be forbidden in the territories.

Williams and his committee either influenced Lincoln directly on "fusion," or else they confirmed a position on "fusion" that Lincoln had already adopted.

== At the United States Supreme Court ==
Williams argued a case before the United States Supreme Court on December 6 and 7, 1855. Orville Browning, Williams's good friend from Quincy, Illinois, was the opposing lawyer. The issue in dispute dealt with rival claims for lands and centered on whether the question of "bad faith" in the matter should be decided by a judge or by a jury. The Court ruled in Wright v. Mattison that "bad faith" should not be decided by the judge but by the jury, which had been the precedent. The Court ordered the case to be retried in a lower court. The outcome was a victory for Browning and a loss for Williams.

== The Republican Party in Illinois ==
In 1856, Williams was the temporary chairman at a major anti-Nebraska convention in Bloomington, Illinois. Williams led the convention until a permanent chairman had been elected. While attending the convention, Lincoln and Williams slept in the same bed at the Bloomington home of David Davis, a close friend of both men. A historian noted:

"At Bloomington, Lincoln, Williams, his old associate in the Legislature, [and] T. Lyle Dickey, of Ottawa, Illinois, a good lawyer, went to [David] Davis's house and lived there during the Convention. Lincoln and Williams slept in one bed and Dickey and Whitney in another ... The course of the historic Bloomfield Convention was decisively influenced by the counsels that came from the steady men in the Davis House."

Although the name "Republican" was applied at a later date, the anti-Nebraska convention in Bloomington was considered the birthplace of the Republican Party in Illinois. Some historians argued that Williams, Orville H. Browning, and Lincoln did not exactly "found" the Illinois Republican Party at Bloomington in 1856. It was more likely the three men were part of a "band of Whigs who, by May, 1856, had taken over the Republican Party [in Illinois] and organized it on conservative lines."

At Bloomington, Williams, Browning, and Lincoln made "No slavery in the territories" the watchword of an emerging state political party that previously had abolitionist tendencies.

In 1858, at a state party convention in Springfield, Lincoln was nominated to be the Republican candidate for United States Senator from Illinois. A resolution passed at the convention stated that Lincoln "was the first and only choice of the Republicans of Illinois for the United States Senate."

In the famous Lincoln–Douglas debates in the 1858 Illinois United States Senate race, Democratic candidate Stephen Douglas attacked Lincoln three times for having been described as "the first and only choice" of Illinois Republicans for the Senate seat. All three times, Douglas pointed to Williams as an Illinois Republican who would have been an acceptable alternate choice to Lincoln in that contest.

Williams traveled and spoke throughout the state of Illinois in Lincoln's behalf during the 1858 United States Senate race. A newspaper in Quincy allied with the Republican Party, printed: "Old Archie Williams is doing good service for the Republican cause ... He has already spoken at Macomb, Oquawka, Monmouth, Cameron, Galesburg, and other points ... to large assemblages; and everywhere, he has created enthusiasm and confidence among our friends and animated the lukewarm ... In the winter of his life ... Mr. Williams is found battling for the cause of Republicanism."

The Illinois state legislature chose Stephen Douglas over Lincoln in the 1858 United States Senate race. A close friend of Lincoln's wrote: "In January, 1859, while the Democrats were celebrating the election of Stephen A. Douglas to the United States Senate, Williams ... came into Lincoln's office and finding him writing said: 'Well, the Democrats are making a great noise over their victory.' Looking up Lincoln replied: 'Yes, Archie, Douglas has taken this trick, but the game is not played out.'"

The Lincoln–Douglas debates became so well known that Lincoln gave personally signed presentation copies of the debates to his best friends and political associates. The one given to Williams was inscribed in Lincoln's handwriting: "To Hon: Archibald Williams, with respects of A. Lincoln." It was one more sign of Lincoln's close friendship and strong political alliance with Williams.

On December 25, 1859, a number of leading Republicans in Quincy, Illinois, including Williams, met with Horace Greeley, a prominent national journalist and editor of the New York Tribune. Greeley had famously stated "Go west, young man. Go west!" Williams and the other Quincy Republicans talked to Greeley about Lincoln possibly becoming the Republican candidate for president in 1860.

Williams spoke throughout Illinois in behalf of Lincoln during Lincoln's successful 1860 campaign for the White House in Washington, D.C.

== Supreme Court offer ==
Following his election to the United States presidency in 1860, Lincoln offered to nominate Williams to a seat on the United States Supreme Court. Williams declined the offer due to his ill health and advanced age. Williams recommended that Lincoln appoint a younger court nominee who could live for more years and thereby serve longer on the Court.

== Memorial ==
Williams was praised in obituaries as a leading attorney in Illinois in the mid-19th Century. His many political and governmental activities were noted, along with his deep friendship with Lincoln. The bar association in Quincy donated a large marble grave marker for Williams. The base of the marker was a stack of law books; an obelisk was placed on top of the law books. He was buried in Woodland Cemetery in Quincy at a grave site that overlooks the Mississippi River.

== Family ==
Williams married Nancy Kemp, who also had come from Kentucky, on July 28, 1831. They had nine children, but only five grew to be adults. She died on March 16, 1854, giving birth to a daughter, Nancy Williams. The baby survived the birth and lived to be an adult. Archibald and Nancy Williams had been married for 22 years. Williams married his second wife, Ellen M. Parker, on September 24, 1861. The marriage lasted a little less than two years until Williams's death.

== Sources ==
- "Williams, Archibald - Federal Judicial Center". www.fjc.gov.
- Robert D. Loevy and Walton T. Loevy, "Archibald Williams: A Friend of Abraham Lincoln," unpublished manuscript (public domain), Brenner Library, Quincy University, Quincy, Illinois. Copies also at Historical Society of Quincy, Illinois, and Adams County; the Quincy, Illinois, Public Library; and the Abraham Lincoln Presidential Library in Springfield, Illinois.
- Norma Lorene Johnston, "Lincoln's Relationships with Four Quincy Republicans," Masters Thesis, University of Wisconsin, 1955.
- Maurice G. Baxter, Orville H. Browning: Lincoln's Friend and Critic (Bloomington, IN: Indiana University Press, 1957).
- Theodore C. Pease and James G. Randall, The Diary of Orville Hickman Browning (Springfield, IL: Illinois State Historical Library, 1925 and 1933), Volumes I–II.
- Earl Schenck Myers, Ed., Lincoln Day by Day – A Chronology, 1809–1865 (Dayton, OH: Morningside, 1991).
- Roy P. Basler, Collected Works of Abraham Lincoln (Springfield. IL: 1953), Volumes I–VI.
- Dallin H. Oaks and Marvin S. Hill, Carthage Conspiracy: The Trial of the Accused Assassins of Joseph Smith (Urbana, IL: University of Illinois Press, 1975).
- Arthur Charles Cole, Ed., The Constitutional Debates of 1847 (Springfield, IL: Illinois Historical Library, 1919).
- Dennis J. Thavenet, "William Alexander Richardson, 1811–1875," PhD. dissertation, University of Nebraska, 1967.
- Paul Simon, Lincoln's Preparation for Greatness: The Illinois Legislative Years (Norman, OK: University of Oklahoma Press, 1965).
- Mr. Lincoln and Friends(https://www.MrLincolnAndFriends.org), click on Politicians, click on Archibald Williams.
- Archibald Williams Family of Quincy, Illinois (http://faculty1.coloradocollege.edu/~bloevy/WilliamsFamilyQuincy)
- Archibald Williams: A Friend of Abraham Lincoln
- (http://faculty1.coloradocollege.edu/~bloevy/ArchibaldWilliamsBook)

Legal offices
| Preceded by Seat established by 12 Stat. 126 | Judge of the United States District Court for the District of Kansas; 1861–1863 | Succeeded by Mark W. Delahay |
