= John A. Williams (judge) =

American judge (1835–1900)

Judge of the United States District Court for the Eastern District of Arkansas
- In office September 22, 1890 – July 7, 1900
- Appointed by: Benjamin Harrison
- Preceded by: Henry Clay Caldwell
- Succeeded by: Jacob Trieber

Personal details
- Born: John A. Williams; May 1, 1835 Remsen, New York
- Died: July 7, 1900 (aged 65) Manitou Springs, Colorado

John A. Williams (May 1, 1835 – July 7, 1900) was a United States district judge of the United States District Court for the Eastern District of Arkansas.

== Education and career ==
Born in Remsen, New York, Williams was a merchant in Delafield, Wisconsin until 1860, and clerk of the County Court for Waukesha County, Wisconsin until 1861. He was in the United States Army during the American Civil War from 1861 to 1865, achieving the rank of captain. He was then in private practice in Pine Bluff, Arkansas from 1866 to 1877. He became a Judge of the Eleventh Judicial Circuit Court of Arkansas, serving in that office until 1882, and thereafter returning to private practice in Pine Bluff.

== Federal judicial service ==
On August 14, 1890, Williams was nominated by President Benjamin Harrison to a seat on the United States District Court for the Eastern District of Arkansas vacated by Judge Henry Clay Caldwell. Williams was confirmed by the United States Senate on September 22, 1890, and received his commission the same day. Williams served in that capacity until his death on July 7, 1900, in Manitou Springs, Colorado.

== Sources ==
Legal offices
Preceded by Henry Clay Caldwell	Judge of the United States District Court for the Eastern District of Arkansas; 1890–1900	Succeeded by Jacob Trieber
