= Tony Mattivi =

American judge (born 1964)

Anthony Wayne Mattivi
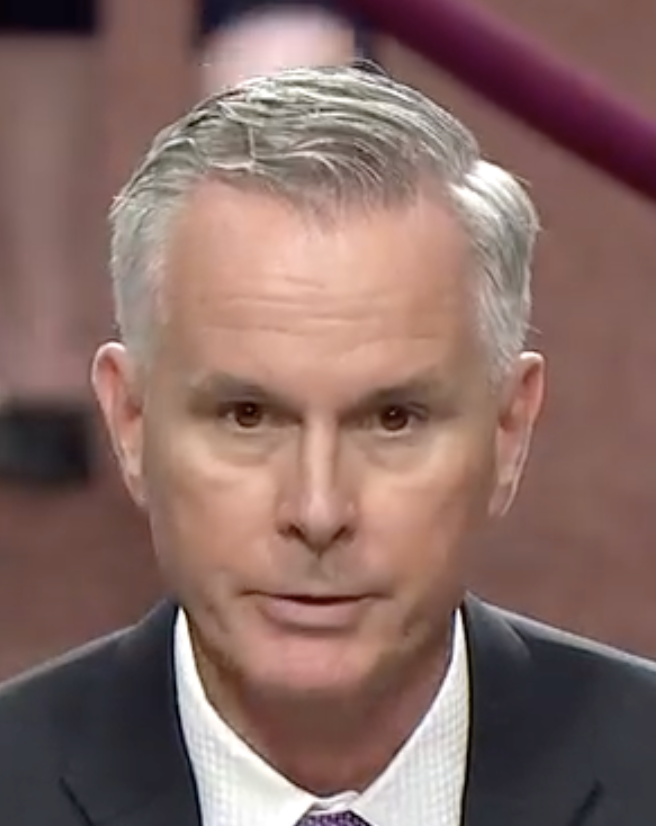

Judge of the United States District Court for the District of Kansas
- Incumbent
- Assumed office June 18, 2026
- Appointed by: Donald Trump
- Preceded by: Daniel D. Crabtree

Director of the Kansas Bureau of Investigation
- In office 2023–2026
- Appointed by: Kris Kobach
- Preceded by: Kirk D. Thompson

Personal details
- Born: 1964 (age 61–62) Atwater, California, U.S.
- Education: Metropolitan State University of Denver (BS); Washburn University (JD)

Anthony Wayne Mattivi (born 1964) is an American attorney who has served as a United States district judge of the United States District Court for the District of Kansas since 2026. He previously served as the director of the Kansas Bureau of Investigation from 2023 to 2026.

== Early life and education ==
Mattivi was born in 1964, in Atwater, California. He grew up in Colorado, and attended the University of Colorado for one year, before leaving to spend several years as an emergency medical technician and paramedic before returning to school. He received his Bachelor of Science degree in 1990 from the Metropolitan State College of Denver (now the Metropolitan State University of Denver). At first, he wanted to become a doctor, but after a difficult organic chemistry class, he went to law school. He received a Juris Doctor in 1994 from the Washburn University School of Law.

== Career ==
After working as an assistant district attorney in Shawnee County, Kansas, Mattivi joined the Kansas Attorney General's office, before beginning a 22-year-long career at the United States Department of Justice. During this time, he held an assortment of positions, including assistant United States attorney.

=== 2022 campaign for Attorney General of Kansas ===
Mattivi sought the Republican nomination for Attorney General of Kansas in the 2022 election. However, he lost in the primary to former Secretary of State Kris Kobach, who would then go on to nominate him as Director of the Kansas Bureau of Investigation in 2023. He was confirmed by the Kansas State Senate on February 9, 2023. In this role, he ordered the raids on 18 Cannabidiol dispensaries. He backed mandatory background checks for all school employees.

=== Federal judicial service ===
President Donald Trump announced his intent to nominate Mattivi to the United States District Court for the District of Kansas in February 2026. On March 2, 2026, Trump formally appointed Mattivi to the seat vacated by Judge Daniel D. Crabtree. On April 15, 2026, the Senate Judiciary Committee held a hearing on his nomination. On May 14, 2026 his nomination was reported to the United States Senate by a 12–10 party-line vote. On June 8, 2026, the Senate invoked cloture on his nomination by a 49–42 vote. On June 9, 2026, his nomination was confirmed by a 51–46 vote. He received his judicial commission on June 18, 2026.

== Personal ==
Mattivi met his wife, Judge Mary Mattivi of the Shawnee County District Court, while attending law school and they were married the year after they graduated.

Legal offices
Preceded by Daniel D. Crabtree	Judge of the United States District Court for the District of Kansas; 2026–present	Incumbent
