= Cassius Gaius Foster =

American judge

Judge of the United States District Court for the District of Kansas
- In office March 10, 1874 – February 28, 1899
- Appointed by: Ulysses S. Grant
- Preceded by: Mark W. Delahay
- Succeeded by: William Cather Hook

Member of the Kansas Senate
- In office 1863-1864

Personal details
- Born: Cassius Gaius Foster; June 22, 1837 Webster, New York, U.S.
- Died: June 21, 1899 (aged 61) Topeka, Kansas, U.S.
- Education: read law

Cassius Gaius Foster (June 22, 1837 – June 21, 1899) was a United States district judge of the United States District Court for the District of Kansas.

== Education and career ==
Born in Webster, New York, Foster read law to enter the bar in 1859. He was in private practice in Rochester, New York in 1859, and in Atchison, Kansas from 1859 to 1863. He was a member of the Kansas Senate from 1863 to 1864, returning to private practice in Atchison from 1864 to 1867. He then served as Mayor of Atchison in 1867, returning to private practice in 1868, where he continued through 1874.

== Federal judicial service ==
On March 9, 1874, Foster was nominated by President Ulysses S. Grant to a seat on the United States District Court for the District of Kansas vacated by Judge Mark W. Delahay. Foster was confirmed by the United States Senate on March 10, 1874, and received his commission the same day. Foster served in that capacity until his retirement on February 28, 1899.

== Death ==
Foster died on June 21, 1899, in Topeka, Kansas.

== Sources ==
Legal offices
Preceded by Mark W. Delahay	Judge of the United States District Court for the District of Kansas; 1874–1899	Succeeded by William Cather Hook
