= Henry George Templar =

American judge

Senior Judge of the United States District Court for the District of Kansas
- In office November 1, 1974 – August 5, 1988

Judge of the United States District Court for the District of Kansas
- In office April 12, 1962 – November 1, 1974
- Appointed by: John F. Kennedy
- Preceded by: Seat established by 75 Stat. 80
- Succeeded by: Richard Dean Rogers

Personal details
- Born: Henry George Templar; October 18, 1904 Cowley County, Kansas
- Died: August 5, 1988 (aged 83)
- Education: Washburn University School of Law (LL.B.)

Henry George Templar (October 18, 1904 – August 5, 1988) was a United States district judge of the United States District Court for the District of Kansas.

== Education and career ==
Born in Cowley County, Kansas, Templar received a Bachelor of Laws from Washburn University School of Law in 1927. He was in private practice in Arkansas City, Kansas from 1927 to 1953. He was a deputy oil inspector for the State of Kansas from 1930 to 1932. He was a member of the Kansas House of Representatives from 1933 to 1941. He was a member of the Kansas Senate from 1945 to 1953. He was the United States Attorney for the District of Kansas from 1953 to 1954. He was in private practice in Arkansas City from 1955 to 1962.

== Federal judicial service ==
Templar was nominated by President John F. Kennedy on March 21, 1962, to the United States District Court for the District of Kansas, to a new seat created by 75 Stat. 80. He was confirmed by the United States Senate on April 11, 1962, and received his commission on April 12, 1962. He assumed senior status on November 1, 1974. Templar served in that capacity until his death on August 5, 1988.

== Sources ==
Legal offices
Preceded by Seat established by 75 Stat. 80	Judge of the United States District Court for the District of Kansas; 1962–1974	Succeeded by Richard Dean Rogers
