= Richard Haines =

- Born: Richard Haines; December 29, 1906; Marion, Iowa
- Died: August 10, 1990 (aged 83); Los Angeles, California
- Occupations: artist, muralist

Kansas Farming (1936), Haines's mural for the United States Post Office and Federal Building in Wichita, Kansas

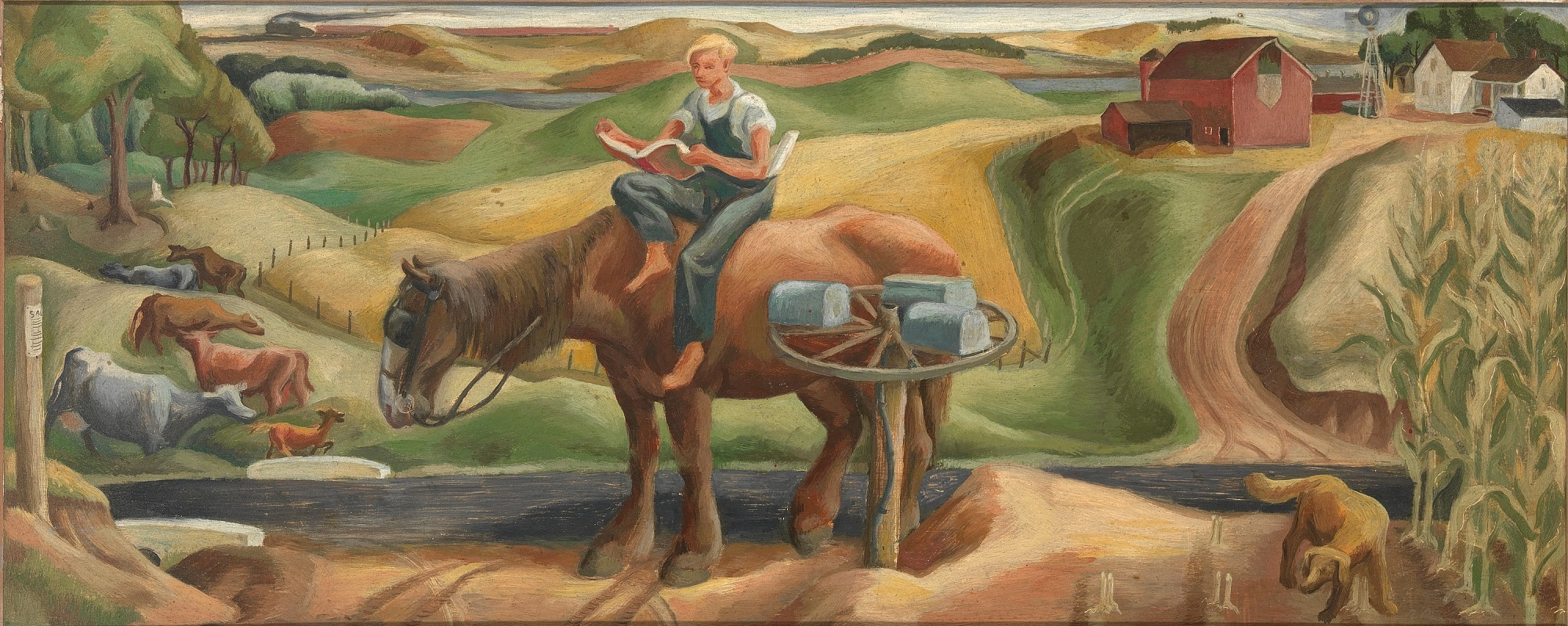
Study for Arrival of the Fall Catalogue (1938), Haines's post office mural in Hastings, Minnesota

Richard Haines (born Marion, Iowa, December 29, 1906, died, Los Angeles, California October 9, 1984) was an American New Deal muralist.

== Murals ==
Murals were produced from 1934 to 1943 in the United States through the Section of Painting and Sculpture, later called the Section of Fine Arts, of the Treasury Department. Haines was commissioned to paint an oil-on-canvas mural for the Berwyn, Illinois post office In 1942, and the Hastings, Minnesota post office. Arrival of the Fall Catalogue was completed in 1938. He also painted a fresco mural in the Sebeka, Minnesota High School building in 1938.

== Death ==
Richard Haines died in 1984 in Los Angeles, California.
