= Richard Dean Rogers =

American judge

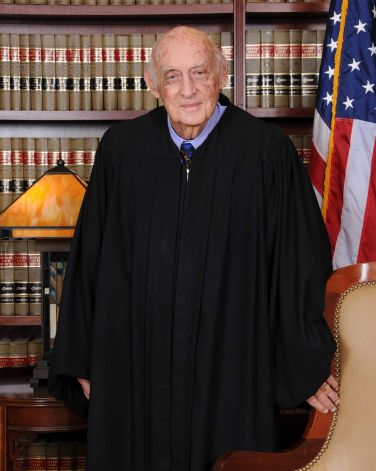

Senior Judge of the United States District Court for the District of Kansas
- In office January 1, 1989 – November 25, 2016

Judge of the United States District Court for the District of Kansas
- In office August 5, 1975 – January 1, 1989
- Appointed by: Gerald Ford
- Preceded by: Henry George Templar
- Succeeded by: George Thomas Van Bebber

President of the Kansas Senate
- In office 1975 – August 8, 1975
- Preceded by: Robert Frederick Bennett
- Succeeded by: Ross Doyen

Member of the Kansas Senate from the 22nd district
- In office 1973 – August 8, 1975
- Succeeded by: Donn Everett

Member of the Kansas Senate from the 15th district
- In office January 12, 1969 – 1972
- Preceded by: Robert Frederick Bennett
- Succeeded by: John Vermillion

Personal details
- Born: December 29, 1921 Oberlin, Kansas
- Died: November 25, 2016 (aged 94) Topeka, Kansas
- Education: Kansas State University (B.S.); University of Kansas School of Law (J.D.)

Richard Dean Rogers (December 29, 1921 – November 25, 2016) was a United States district judge of the United States District Court for the District of Kansas.

== Education and career ==
Born in Oberlin, Kansas, Rogers received a Bachelor of Science degree from Kansas State University in 1943. He served in the United States Army Air Corps as a Captain Bombardier during World War II, flying 33 missions over Europe from 1943 to 1945. He received a Juris Doctor from the University of Kansas School of Law in 1947. He was in private practice in Manhattan, Kansas from 1947 to 1975. He was an instructor at Kansas State University from 1948 to 1952. He was a city commissioner of Manhattan from 1950 to 1952. He was the Mayor of Manhattan in 1952. He was the county attorney of Riley County, Kansas from 1954 to 1958. He was a city commissioner of Manhattan from 1959 to 1965. He was General Counsel of the Kansas Farm Bureau and Service Companies in Manhattan from 1960 to 1975. He was again Mayor of Manhattan in 1964. He was a member of the Kansas House of Representatives from 1964 to 1968. He was a member of the Kansas Senate from 1968 to 1975. He was President of the Kansas Senate during 1975.

== Federal judicial service ==
On July 15, 1975, Rogers was nominated by President Gerald Ford to a seat on the United States District Court for the District of Kansas vacated by Judge Henry George Templar. Rogers was confirmed by the United States Senate on July 31, 1975, and received his commission on August 5, 1975. He assumed senior status on January 1, 1989. He was succeeded by Judge George Thomas Van Bebber. He took inactive senior status on August 7, 2015, and continued in that status until his death on November 25, 2016, in Topeka, Kansas.

== See also ==
- List of mayors of Manhattan, Kansas

== Sources ==
Legal offices
Preceded by Henry George Templar	Judge of the United States District Court for the District of Kansas; 1975–1989	Succeeded by George Thomas Van Bebber
