= Barry Grissom =

American attorney

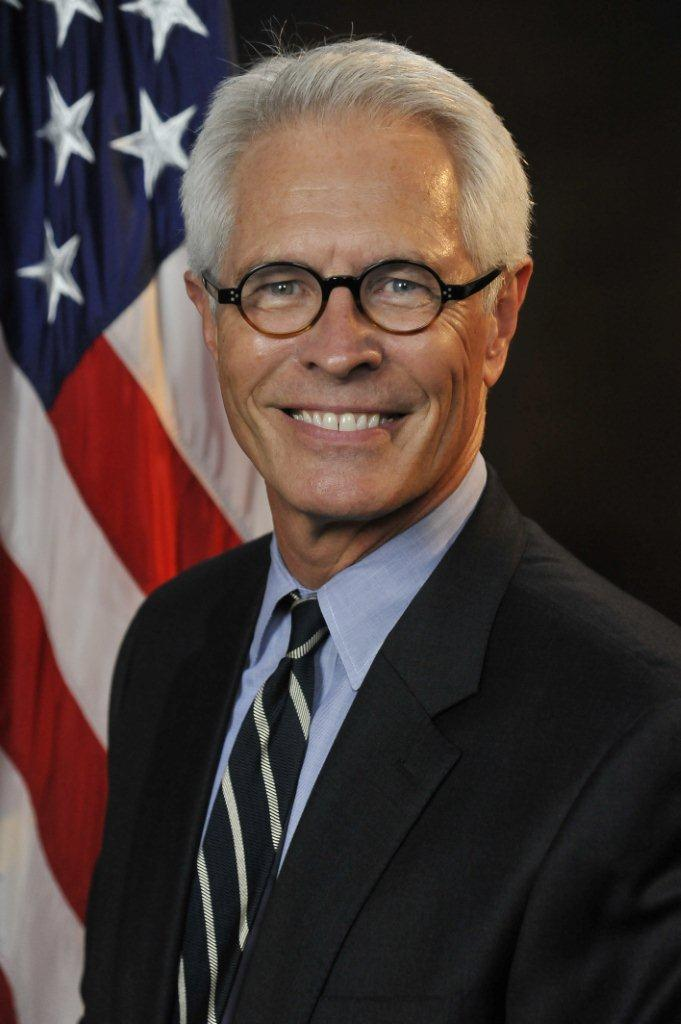

United States Attorney for the District of Kansas
- In office August 20, 2010 – April 15, 2016
- President: Barack Obama
- Preceded by: Lanny Welch (acting)
- Succeeded by: Stephen McAllister

Personal details
- Born: April 12, 1954 (age 72) Lebanon, Kentucky, U.S.
- Party: Democratic
- Education: University of Kansas (BS); Oklahoma City University (JD)

Barry Ray Grissom (born April 12, 1954) is an American attorney who served as the United States Attorney for the District of Kansas from 2010 to 2016. On July 1, 2019, Barry Grissom officially launched his campaign for the Democratic Party nomination for U.S. Senate. On October 17, 2019, he dropped out of the race, and endorsed former Kansas state Senator Barbara Bollier for the race.

== Education ==
Grissom graduated from Willowbrook High School in 1972 and went to Johnson County Community College and then the University of Kansas where he earned a bachelor's degree in Science in 1977. He then studied law at the Oklahoma City University School of Law, earning a JD in 1981. At OCU Law, he was a member of the Law Review, the Moot Court Board and the Order of the Barristers.

== Career ==
Returning to Kansas, he began a private practice in 1983, focused on representing victims of negligence, on civil rights and labor issues, including Fair Labor Standards Act cases. From 1986 to 2010 he was a member of the board of governors for the Kansas Trial Lawyers Association. He was appointed the U.S. Attorney for Kansas by President Barack Obama in 2010, serving until April 2016, after which he joined the national Polsinelli law firm. He had been a member of Eric Holder's Attorney General's Advisory Committee, as well as becoming a panelist on the Brennan Center's Blue Ribbon Panel on the redefinition of federal prosecution priorities. The panel's report emphasized both targeting violent offenders at the same time addressing issues of over-incarceration.

In April 2018, he founded the Grissom Law Group which additionally focused on public policy advocacy. In 2018, he became the Senior Vice President of Electrum Partners.

== U.S. Attorney ==
As the U.S. Attorney for the District of Kansas, Barry Grissom focused on civil rights enforcement and community outreach. During his tenure, Grissom founded the Kansas Civil Rights Symposium (which promoted efforts to improve community relations with law enforcement), the District's first Human Trafficking Working Group (which coordinated the work of NGO's with law enforcement to curb human trafficking), directed the District's Project Safe Neighborhood program (which targeted felons who unlawfully possessed firearms), and oversaw the District's Project Safe Childhood program (which targeted child sex offenders).

During his tenure as US Attorney, various subordinates kept recordings of attorney-client phone calls of inmates in a detention facility. The US District Court found the office to be in contempt of court. A number of convictions and/or cases have been reversed or abandoned due to this unconstitutional activity. Grissom claimed to be unaware.

== 2020 U.S. Senate campaign ==
On July 1, 2019, Grissom announced he would run for the U.S. Senate in Kansas.

He dropped out of the race on October 17, 2019, and endorsed state Senator Barbara Bollier.

== External sources ==
PBS Interview on gun violence
