= Kansas Bureau of Investigation =

Bureau of investigation of the US state of Kansas

- Official patch of the Kansas Bureau of Investigation

- Official seal for the Kansas Bureau of Investigation
- Abbreviation: KBI
- Motto: “Dedication. Service. Integrity.”

Agency overview
- Formed: 1939
- Employees: 253

Jurisdictional structure
- Operations jurisdiction: Kansas, USA
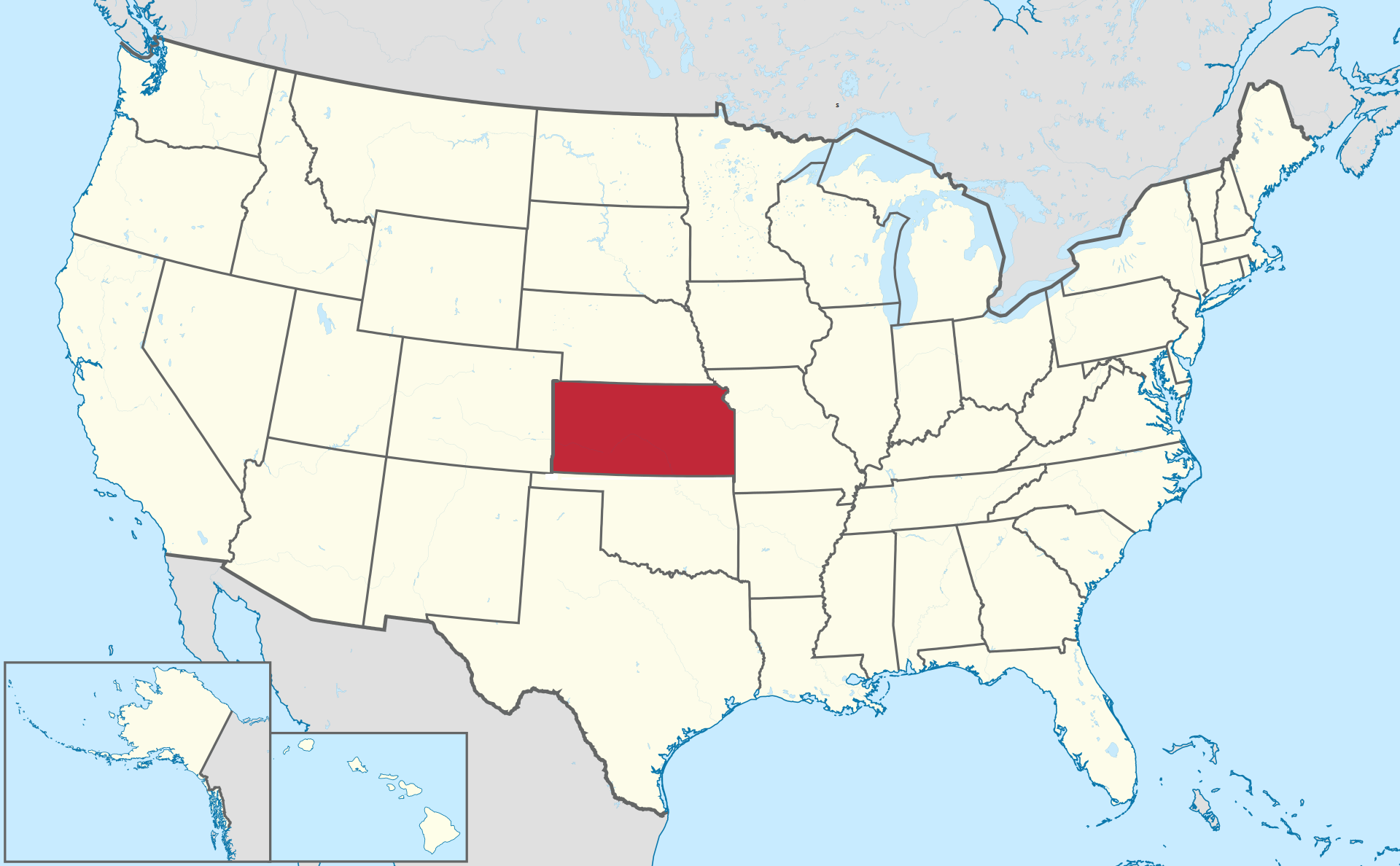
- Jurisdiction of the KBI
- Legal jurisdiction: Government of Kansas
- Governing body: Attorney General of the State of Kansas
- General nature: Civilian police

Operational structure
- Headquarters: 1620 SW Tyler Street; Topeka, Kansas
- Special agents: 72
- Civilians: 181
- Elected officer responsible: Kris W. Kobach, Kansas Attorney General
- Agency executive: Robert Jacobs, Interim Director

Website
- KBI Website

The Kansas Bureau of Investigation (KBI) is the state bureau of investigation of the U.S. state of Kansas. The KBI is a division of the Kansas Attorney General and responsible for providing investigative and criminal laboratory services to criminal justice agencies, as well as investigating and preventing crime in the state of Kansas. Robert Jacobs is the current interim director of the KBI.

The KBI has nearly 300 employees including 72 special agents and 181 civilian employees.

== The KBI's mission ==
The Kansas Bureau of Investigation is dedicated to providing professional investigative, laboratory and criminal justice information services to criminal justice agencies for the purpose of promoting public safety and preventing crime in Kansas.

—KBI Web site

== History ==
The Kansas Legislature established The Kansas Bureau of Investigation in 1939. The bureau is a division of the Office of the Attorney General. The KBI assists local law enforcement agencies with more mobile and criminal activity. In the early years, the crimes were often bank robberies. Today, the KBI’s main task is providing expertise and assistance to local law enforcement departments in handling criminal incidents. The KBI has also been given the authority to maintain the state’s criminal justice records. Years later, the KBI Forensic Science Laboratory was added to assist the criminal justice community in Kansas with forensic science services.

The KBI was the primary agency involved in the murder investigation chronicled in Truman Capote's In Cold Blood as well as confirming the identity of the BTK Killer in Wichita.

== Organization of the KBI ==
The KBI Divisions include:

1. Field Investigations Division
2. Special Operations Division
3. Forensic Laboratory Division
4. Information Services Division
5. Information Technology

== Directors ==
Since its founding, the KBI has had 13 directors.

1. Lou Richter (1939–1956)
2. Logan H. Sanford (1957–1969)
3. Harold R. Nye (1969–1971)
4. Fred H. Howard II (1971–1975)
5. William H. Albott (1975–1979)
6. Thomas E. Kelly (1979–1987)
7. David E. Johnson (1987–1989)
8. James G. Malson (1989–1992)
9. Robert B. Davenport (1992–1994)
10. Larry Welch (1994–2007)
11. Robert E. Blecha (2007–2011)
12. Kirk D. Thompson (2011–2023)
13. Tony Mattivi (2023–2026)
14. Robert Jacobs (2026–present)

== Office locations ==
The KBI maintains offices at the following locations.

=== Headquarters ===
- Topeka

=== Regional offices ===
- Overland Park
- Great Bend
- Wichita
- Pittsburg (Southeast Kansas Drug Enforcement Taskforce)

== KBI programs ==
=== Drug Enforcement ===
The KBI is involved in the fight against drugs and does its part to educate citizens on the signs and activity of illegal drug use and abuse.

=== KS Missing Person ===
The KBI provides information that will aid law enforcement, parents, missing children’s agencies and others seeking to find their loved ones. The goal of the Kansas Bureau of Investigation is the resolution of all missing or unidentified person cases. Additionally, the KBI provides support groups for people involved in missing person cases.

==== Resources ====
- Missing Persons Brochure
- Kansas Missing Children's Day Poster Contests
- Parental Abductions
- You Can Help!
- Kansas AMBER Alert Web Site

==== Support groups ====
- Take Root
- Team Hope
- NetSmartz Workshop
- 2 Smart 4 U

=== Kansas Most Wanted ===
The KBI keeps records of Kansas’ most wanted criminals and provides resources for assisting law enforcement.

=== Kansas Sexual Assault Kit Initiative ===
The KBI started the Kansas Sexual Assault Kit Initiative (SAKI) in 2014. They began determining the number of submitted sexual assault kits had been collected by forensic nurses and turned over to law enforcement without being sent to a crime laboratory for forensic analysis. The Bureau of Justice Assistance awarded the KBI a $2 million grant in 2015 to support their efforts. In addition to collecting untested kits, the KBI started a multidisciplinary working group to evaluate the underlying factors contributing to the accumulation of this forensic evidence. The group has been working to create evidence-based recommendations and model policy to address the inventory and prevent an accumulation in the future. More information about the results of the initiative can be in the Kansas SAKI Brochure.

=== Registered Offender Search ===
The KBI created the Registered Offender Search to facilitate public access to information about persons who have been convicted of certain sex, violent and drug offenses that are set forth in the Kansas Offender Registration Act. The Website is updated every fifteen minutes, and the KBI works to ensure the information is complete, accurate and up to date.

- Conduct a Kansas Registered Offenders Search
- Conduct a National Sex Offender Search
- Conduct a KASPER (DOC) Search
