= Guy T. Helvering =

American judge

Guy Helvering
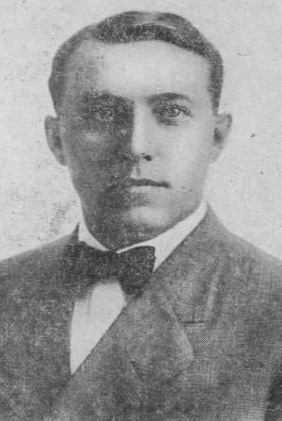

Judge of the United States District Court for the District of Kansas
- In office October 11, 1943 – July 4, 1946
- Appointed by: Franklin D. Roosevelt
- Preceded by: Richard Joseph Hopkins
- Succeeded by: Seat abolished

Commissioner of Internal Revenue
- In office June 6, 1933 – October 8, 1943
- President: Franklin D. Roosevelt
- Preceded by: Pressly R. Baldridge (Acting)
- Succeeded by: Robert E. Hannegan

Member of the U.S. House of Representatives from Kansas's 5th district
- In office March 4, 1913 – March 3, 1919
- Preceded by: Rollin R. Rees
- Succeeded by: James G. Strong

Personal details
- Born: Guy Tresillian Helvering; January 10, 1878 Felicity, Ohio, U.S.
- Died: July 4, 1946 (aged 68) Washington, D.C., U.S.
- Party: Democratic
- Education: University of Kansas; University of Michigan (LLB)

Military service
- Allegiance: United States
- Branch/service: United States Army
- Rank: Corporal
- Unit: Company M, 22nd Kansas Volunteer Infantry
- Battles/wars: Spanish–American War

Guy Tresillian Helvering (January 10, 1878 – July 4, 1946) was a United States representative from Kansas, Commissioner of Internal Revenue and a United States district judge of the United States District Court for the District of Kansas.

== Education and career ==
Born on January 10, 1878, in Felicity, Clermont County, Ohio, Helvering moved to Kansas in 1887 with his parents, who settled in Beattie, Marshall County, Kansas. Helvering attended the public schools, then attended the University of Kansas, before receiving a Bachelor of Laws in 1906 from the University of Michigan Law School. He served in the United States Army as a corporal in Company M of the 22nd Kansas Volunteer Infantry from May 12, 1898, to November 3, 1898, during the Spanish–American War. He was admitted to the bar and entered private practice in Marysville, Kansas from 1906 to 1913. He was prosecutor for Marshall County from 1907 to 1911.

== Congressional service ==
Helvering was an unsuccessful Democratic candidate for election in 1910 to the 62nd United States Congress. He was elected as a Democrat to the United States House of Representatives of the 63rd, 64th and 65th United States Congresses, serving from March 4, 1913, to March 3, 1919. He was an unsuccessful candidate for reelection in 1918 to the 66th United States Congress.

== Later career ==
Helvering was a banker in Salina, Kansas from 1919 to 1926. He was the Mayor of Salina from 1926 to 1930. He was the Chairman of the Kansas Democratic Party from 1930 to 1934. He was the highway director for the State of Kansas from 1931 to 1932. He was the Commissioner of Internal Revenue of the Bureau of Internal Revenue (now the Internal Revenue Service) in the United States Department of the Treasury from 1933 to 1943.

== Federal judicial service ==
Helvering was nominated by President Franklin D. Roosevelt on September 14, 1943, to a seat on the United States District Court for the District of Kansas vacated by Judge Richard Joseph Hopkins. He was confirmed by the United States Senate on September 28, 1943, and received his commission on October 11, 1943. His service terminated on July 4, 1946, due to his death in Washington, D.C. He was interred in Marysville Cemetery in Marysville.

== See also ==
- List of mayors of Salina, Kansas

== Sources ==
- United States Congress. "Guy T. Helvering (id: H000466)". Biographical Directory of the United States Congress.

U.S. House of Representatives
Preceded by Rollin R. Rees	Member of the U.S. House of Representatives from Kansas's 5th congressional district 1913–1919	Succeeded by James G. Strong
Government offices
Preceded by Pressly R. Baldridge; Acting	Commissioner of Internal Revenue; 1933–1943	Succeeded by Robert E. Hannegan
Legal offices
Preceded by Richard Joseph Hopkins	Judge of the United States District Court for the District of Kansas; 1943–1946	Seat abolished
