= Mark W. Delahay =

American judge

Mark Delahay
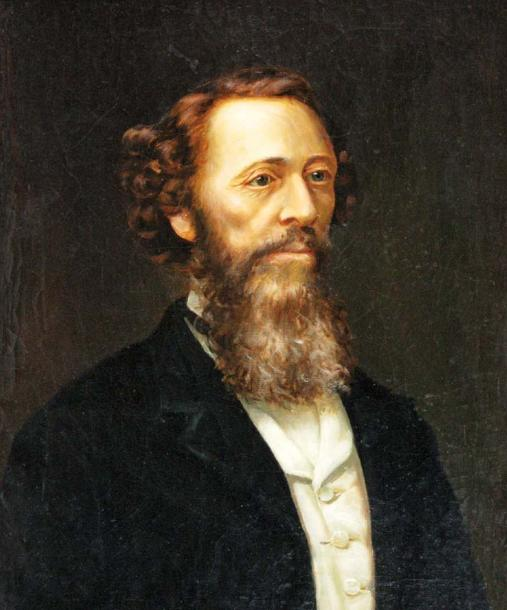

Judge of the United States District Court for the District of Kansas
- In office October 6, 1863 – December 12, 1873
- Appointed by: Abraham Lincoln
- Preceded by: Archibald Williams
- Succeeded by: Cassius Gaius Foster

Personal details
- Born: Mark William Delahay; 1817; Talbot County, Maryland, U.S.
- Died: May 8, 1879 (aged 61–62); Kansas City, Kansas, U.S.
- Political party: Republican

Mark William Delahay (1817 – May 8, 1879) was a United States district judge of the United States District Court for the District of Kansas. He resigned after being impeached by the United States House of Representatives due to allegations of alcoholism.

== Career ==
Born in 1817, in Talbot County, Maryland, Delahay entered private practice in Illinois until 1853. He was the editor of the Virginia Observer located in Virginia, Illinois. He resumed private practice in Mobile, Alabama from 1853 to 1855, then in Leavenworth, Kansas Territory from 1855 to 1857. He was owner and editor of The Territorial Register in the Kansas Territory starting in 1857. He was chief clerk of the Kansas Territorial House of Representatives from 1860 to 1861. He was Surveyor General of the Kansas Territory (State of Kansas from January 29, 1861) and the Nebraska Territory from 1861 to 1863.

== Relationship with Abraham Lincoln ==
Delahey had a personal friendship with Abraham Lincoln originating with their mutual cause in establishing the Republican Party. In 1859, Delahay sought the Republican nomination for a United States Senate seat for Kansas.

He evidently wanted Lincoln to intercede with General James H. Lane in his behalf. Instead of approaching Lane directly, as Delahay asked, Lincoln sought to accomplish the desired end by a somewhat circuitous, but equally effective route. He wrote Delahay a letter in which he committed himself to his candidacy, at the same time telling him he might show the letter to General Lane and thus gain the latter's support — a suggestive specimen of Lincoln's subtlety as a politician. In April, 1861, Lincoln appointed Delahay Surveyor-General of Kansas and Nebraska, which office he seems to have filled till October 5, 1863, when Lincoln appointed him United States District Judge for Kansas. His daughter, Mary E. Delahay, is authority for the statement that Lincoln offered to appoint him Minister to Chile, which post he declined.

== Federal judicial service ==
Delahay received a recess appointment from President Abraham Lincoln on October 6, 1863, to a seat on the United States District Court for the District of Kansas vacated by Judge Archibald Williams. He was nominated to the same position by President Lincoln on December 14, 1863. He was confirmed by the United States Senate on March 15, 1864, and received his commission the same day. His service terminated on December 12, 1873, due to his resignation.

=== Impeachment and resignation ===
Delahay was impeached by the United States House of Representatives on February 28, 1873. The investigating committee reported to the House of Representatives that Delahay’s "personal habits unfitted him for the judicial office . . . and that his sobriety would be the exception and not the rule." According to one source, Delahay was "intoxicated off the bench as well as on the bench." While Delahay was impeached, the United States House of Representatives never drew up specific articles of impeachment against him and his resignation ended impeachment proceedings before they ever reached the United States Senate.

== Death ==
Delahay died on May 8, 1879, in Kansas City, Kansas.

== Sources ==
Legal offices
Preceded by Archibald Williams	Judge of the United States District Court for the District of Kansas; 1863–1873	Succeeded by Cassius Gaius Foster
