= United States Post Office and Federal Building (Wichita, Kansas) =

- U.S. Post Office and Federal Building-Wichita
- U.S. National Register of Historic Places
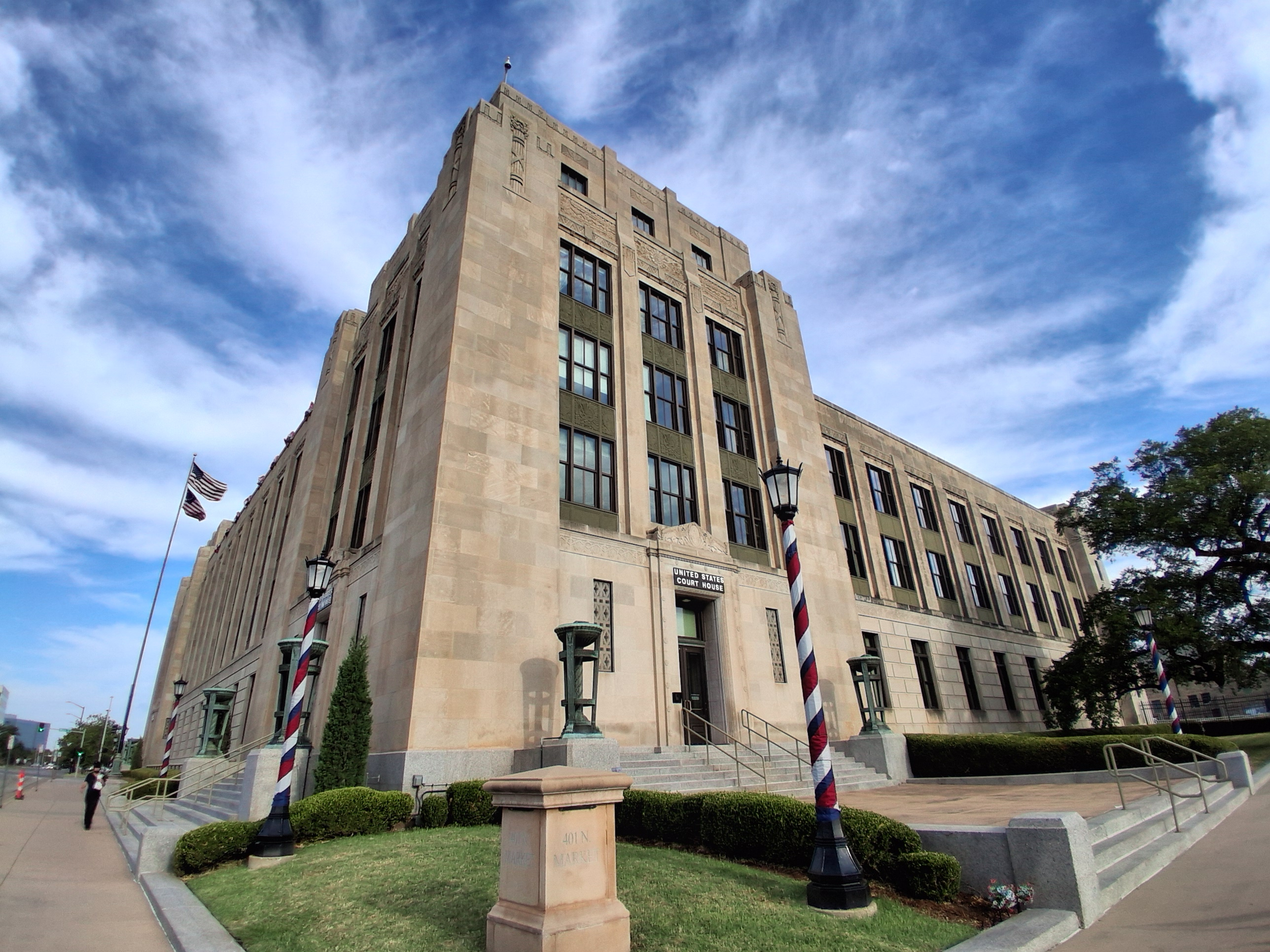
- U.S. Courthouse in 2026

- Location within Kansas Location within the United States
- Location: 401 N. Market, Wichita, Kansas
- Coordinates: 37°41′30″N 97°20′18″W
- Area: less than one acre
- Built: 1936
- Architect: James A. Wetmore, Louis A. Simon
- Architectural style: Moderne
- MPS: Kansas Post Offices with Artwork, 1936--1942 MPS
- NRHP reference No.: 89000792
- Added to NRHP: July 18, 1989

The U.S. Courthouse, Wichita, Kansas is a historic post office, courthouse, and Federal office building located at Wichita in Sedgwick County, Kansas. It is a courthouse for the United States District Court for the District of Kansas.

== Building history ==
The U.S. Courthouse in Wichita, originally the U.S. Post Office and Courthouse, is distinguished by its modern facade and Depression-era murals. The building is listed in the National Register of Historic Places as part of a group of Kansas Post Offices noted for their artwork. The U.S. Courthouse demonstrates a skillful blending of Art Deco and classical influences; it retains the symmetry and proportions of Classical architecture while modernizing exterior ornamentation. It is representative of the large and cohesive body of architectural work by Louis A. Simon, who was responsible for the design of government buildings at the Office of the Supervising Architect under James A. Wetmore. The building was constructed between August 1930 and April 1932 at a cost of $1.2 million.

As a courthouse and post office, the building was significant in the development of the city of Wichita. From the time of the earliest settlement, the Wichita Post Office was a focal point of the community, and when the location of the post office shifted, the downtown commercial area grew up around it. When the site for the new U.S. Courthouse, which was to include the new post office, was selected at 401 North Market Street, it was only a few blocks from the site of Wichita's original post office in the Durfee Ranch Store. The new building provided an anchor for development and helped draw businesses north along Main Street from Douglas Avenue.

== Architecture ==
Modernistic for its time, the U.S. Courthouse is a U-shaped, flat-roofed, steel-framed building clad in beige Bedford limestone. The building is 224 feet by 157 feet, and is three levels in height, with a fourth level across the south elevation, and a fifth level at the towers of the east and west corners. While the receding walls of the towers stress the vertical, the long facades of the building express an overall horizontal emphasis. All windows are in slightly recessed planes, with pilasters between openings. The even fenestration pattern and the rusticated first story of the building are common themes in classically inspired architecture. The main entrances in the towers on the south elevation have heavy molded surrounds, ornamental reveals, and shelf heads. Above the shelf are two winged limestone lions holding a plaque.

Stone carving on the exterior-primarily around the entrances and near the tops of the towers-combines classically inspired, Art Deco, and regional motifs such as winged lions, eagles, buffalo, Native Americans, wheat, and ears of corn. The latter symbols reflect Wichita's cultural and historic heritage. An ornamental band with a stylized, winged-bird motif is centered between the window heads and the cornice line.

Styles displayed on the exterior are continued throughout the interior of the building, where regional motifs blend with classicism. The entrances in the towers on the south elevation open into marble-clad vestibules. The interior doors are hollow bronze set in a wrought-bronze and glass-panel framework. A cast-bronze cornice with four bronze eagles tops the entire framework. The plaster ceiling is coffered with egg-and-dart molding and a star pattern inside the coffers.

The walls of the primary corridors on the second level are clad in Kasota Cream marble. Two pairs of double walnut-panel doors with oval windows open into the District Courtroom. The coffered ceilings feature ornamental plaster work, and the elaborate cornice is also plaster.

The exterior of the U.S. Courthouse retains its original appearance. The most impressive interior spaces with grand materials remain intact; these include the lobbies, corridors, and courtrooms. When the Postal Service moved out in 1986, the U.S. General Services Administration (GSA) restored the finishes of the main lobby and transformed the postal workroom with its wood block floor and warehouse appearance into two courtrooms. Original marble was painstakingly matched and the original paint colors were recreated. Light fixtures, wood paneling and judges' benches were accurately replicated using historic documentation. GSA undertook additional renovations in 1998.

Oil-on-canvas murals, painted in 1935–1936, are located on the east and west walls of the lobby. Artists J. Ward Lockwood and Richard Haines received the commissions through a post office mural project awarded by the U.S. Treasury Department's Painting and Sculpture Section.

Pioneers in Kansas, the mural by Lockwood (a Kansas native), is a collage of images associated with role and evolution of the Postal Service during the settlement of the western United States. A stagecoach laden with mail and passengers marks the center of the canvas, with the other images radiating around it. A Pony Express rider and a Native American exchange fire on the left side of the canvas. A vulture flies above the rider, symbolizing imminent danger and death. A pioneer couple stands on the right side of the canvas, the woman reading a letter. A black steam engine emerges behind the couple, symbolizing continued western expansion.

Kansas Farming, the mural by Haines, depicts various aspects of rural life and farm production, focusing on the importance of urbanization, industrialization, and technology to the economic growth of the region. Rolling hills ripe with the bounty of the fall harvest comprise the idealized rural landscape. Tall corn and sunflower plants frame the center panel of the canvas, in which a farmer on horseback visits his neighbors. Nearby, a young girl holds mail in both hands as the boy waves to an unseen mail plane. A farmer feeds corn to his hogs and looks toward a group of produce packers on the left side of the canvas. In the distant background, a small town with a railroad depot and grain elevator represent the growing role of industry in agriculture.

== Significant events ==
- 1930–1931: The U.S. Courthouse, originally called the U.S. Post Office and Courthouse, is constructed.
- 1935–1936: Under the Department of the Treasury's newly formed Painting and Sculpture Section. Lobby murals are commissioned and installed.
- 1968: The Post Office relocates to a new building.
- 1986: Postal workroom is converted into two courtrooms.
- 1989: The U.S. Courthouse is listed in the National Register of Historic Places.
- 1998: GSA undertakes a third renovation of the Courthouse.

== Building facts ==
- Architects: James A. Wetmore/Louis A. Simon
- Construction Dates: 1930–1932
- Landmark Designation: Listed in the National Register of Historic Places as part of the Kansas Post Offices with Artwork Multiple Property Submission
- Location: 401 North Market Street
- Architectural Style: Art Deco
- Primary Materials: Bedford limestone
- Prominent Feature: Lobby murals, Pioneers in Kansas, by J. Ward Lockwood, and Kansas Farming, by Richard Haines

== See also ==
- List of United States post offices
