= Ronald Finney =

- Born: Ronald Tucker Finney; September 18, 1898; Woodson County, Kansas, U.S.
- Died: October 1, 1961 (aged 63)
- Education: Cornell University
- Occupation: Businessman
- Known for: Role in the Kansas Bond Scandal
- Parent(s): Warren Finney; Mabel Tucker
- Convictions: 31 counts of forgery
- Penalty: 31 to 635 years in prison

Ronald Tucker Finney (September 18, 1898 – October 1, 1961) was a convicted forger at the center of one of the biggest political scandals in Kansas history, known as the Kansas Bond Scandal, involving over $1 million in forged municipal bonds.

Ronald Finney was born in Woodson County, Kansas to Warren and Mabel (née Tucker) Finney. His father owned several telephone companies and was president of Fidelity State and Savings Bank in Emporia, Kansas. Finney graduated from Cornell University in 1921 and then worked for his fathers' bank as a bond salesman.

In June 1933, an investigation started when bank examiners questioned the authenticity of $150,000 in bonds held by National Bank of Topeka as collateral. State Treasurer T.B. (Tom) Boyd resigned, after admitting he had given access to the state treasury vaults to Finney, who took some bonds so that he could forge them. Governor Alf Landon sent the Kansas National Guard to guard the vaults at the statehouse until state accountants could check Boyd's records. Initially they discovered $600,000 in forged bonds in the vaults, with more forged bonds found at a Chicago brokerage. The forged bonds were given to the state as collateral for deposits at banks controlled by the Finney's family, or used as collateral for loans.

Three banks that were controlled by the Finney family failed in August 1933 as a result of the forgeries: Fidelity State and Savings Bank in Emporia, Eureka State Bank in Eureka and Farmers State Bank in Neosho Falls. Ronald Finney was arrested in August 1933 and charged with dealing in forged securities. He pleaded guilty in December 1933 to 31 counts of forgery after an insanity defense failed, and was sentenced to 31 to 635 years in prison. State Treasurer Tom Boyd was convicted in January 1934 of mail fraud and was sentenced to a term of four to ten years in prison. In December 1933, Finney's father, Warren Finney, pleaded guilty to embezzlement. He was sentenced to 12 consecutive prison terms ranging from three to 50 years after the judge had ignored a recommendation for a much more lenient sentence. Warren Finney committed suicide in June 1935 after his appeal failed. Attorney General Roland Boynton and State Auditor Will J. French were impeached, but acquitted. Ronald Finney was released from prison in 1945. After prison, Finney did writing for trade journals. He died of acute bronchitis and emphysema in 1961.

William Lindsay White wrote a novel called "What People Said" based on the Kansas Bond Scandal. White was the son of William Allen White, the editor of the Emporia Gazette and a nationally known figure in journalism and political life. The White and Finney families were friends and neighbors.

This was the second major political scandal in Kansas involving government bonds. In 1862, Governor Charles L. Robinson was impeached by his political enemies for his alleged role in the sale of state and war bonds, although he was exonerated.
