= Stephen McAllister (lawyer) =

American attorney and academic (born 1962)

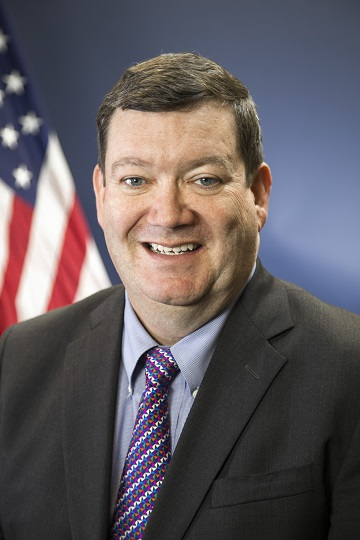

United States Attorney for the District of Kansas
- In office January 25, 2018 – February 28, 2021
- President: Donald Trump; Joe Biden
- Preceded by: Barry Grissom
- Succeeded by: Duston Slinkard (acting)

Solicitor General of Kansas
- In office May 2, 2007 – January 24, 2018
- Succeeded by: Toby Crouse

Personal details
- Born: November 27, 1962 (age 63)
- Education: University of Kansas (BA, JD)

Stephen Robert McAllister (born November 27, 1962) is an American attorney, academic, and former government official. He served as the United States Attorney for the District of Kansas from 2018 to 2021. He also serves as the E.S. & Tom W. Hampton Distinguished Professor of Law at the University of Kansas School of Law. He was formerly the Solicitor General of Kansas.

== Biography ==
McAllister was born on born November 27, 1962. A graduate of the University of Kansas and the University of Kansas School of Law, McAllister clerked for Judge Richard Posner of the United States Court of Appeals for the Seventh Circuit, then was a law clerk for justices Clarence Thomas and Byron R. White of the United States Supreme Court. After law school, he worked in private practice in the Washington D.C. office of Gibson, Dunn & Crutcher. He also served as the interim director of the Robert J. Dole Institute of Politics from 2003 to 2004.

McAllister has argued nine times before the U.S. Supreme Court. He currently teaches federal and state constitutional law and federal civil rights law at the University of Kansas School of Law. He first joined the school's faculty in 1993. He was the dean of the University of Kansas School of Law from 2000 to 2005. He served as the Solicitor General of Kansas from 2007 to 2018, after previously serving as the Solicitor of the State of Kansas from 1999 to 2003.

On February 8, 2021, he along with 55 other Trump-era attorneys were asked to resign. He resigned on February 28, 2021.

== See also ==
- List of law clerks for the sixth seat of the Supreme Court of the United States
- List of law clerks for the tenth seat of the Supreme Court of the United States
