= George Thomas McDermott =

American judge (1886–1937)

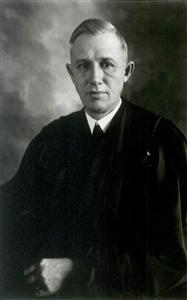

Judge of the United States Court of Appeals for the Tenth Circuit
- In office April 30, 1929 – January 19, 1937
- Appointed by: Herbert Hoover
- Preceded by: Seat established by 40 Stat. 1156
- Succeeded by: Robert L. Williams

Judge of the United States District Court for the District of Kansas
- In office January 16, 1928 – April 30, 1929
- Appointed by: Calvin Coolidge
- Preceded by: Seat established by 45 Stat. 1346
- Succeeded by: Richard Joseph Hopkins

Personal details
- Born: George Thomas McDermott; October 21, 1886 Winfield, Kansas
- Died: January 19, 1937 (aged 50)
- Education: University of Chicago (PhB); University of Chicago Law School (JD)

George Thomas McDermott (October 21, 1886 – January 19, 1937) was a United States circuit judge of the United States Court of Appeals for the Tenth Circuit and previously was a United States district judge of the United States District Court for the District of Kansas.

== Education and career ==
Born in Winfield, Kansas, McDermott received a Bachelor of Philosophy from the University of Chicago in 1908 and a J.D. degree from the University of Chicago Law School in 1909. He was in private practice in Topeka, Kansas from 1910 to 1917. He was in the United States Army as a Lieutenant from 1917 to 1919. He returned to private practice in Topeka from 1919 to 1928.

== Federal judicial service ==
=== District Court service ===
McDermott was nominated by President Calvin Coolidge on January 12, 1928, to the United States District Court for the District of Kansas, to a new seat authorized by 40 Stat. 1156. He was confirmed by the United States Senate on January 16, 1928, and received his commission the same day. His service terminated on April 30, 1929, due to his elevation to the Tenth Circuit.

=== Court of Appeals service ===
McDermott was nominated by President Herbert Hoover on April 18, 1929, to the United States Court of Appeals for the Tenth Circuit, to a new seat authorized by 45 Stat. 1346. He was confirmed by the Senate on April 29, 1929, and received his commission on April 30, 1929. His service terminated on January 19, 1937, due to his death.

== Sources ==
Legal offices
Preceded by Seat established by 40 Stat. 1156	Judge of the United States District Court for the District of Kansas; 1928–1929	Succeeded by Richard Joseph Hopkins
Preceded by Seat established by 45 Stat. 1346	Judge of the United States Court of Appeals for the Tenth Circuit; 1929–1937	Succeeded by Robert L. Williams
