= Sardius Mason Brewster =

American lawyer and politician

Sardius Mason Brewster (born Irving Township, Brown County, Kansas, June 19, 1870; died Topeka, Kansas, March 5, 1936) was an American lawyer and politician. He was the Attorney General of Kansas from 1915 to 1919 and the chief prosecutor of Ronald Finney and others in the Kansas Bond Scandal of 1933–4.

== Early life ==
Brewster's father Arthur Seeley Brewster (1841-1905) was a lawyer raised in Ohio who came to White Cloud, Kansas in 1869 and started a practice there; he served six years as the county attorney of Doniphan County. Brewster's mother was Annie Harriet Byard (1841-1922). Sardius Brewster was the second of four children; his older brother Arthur Wadsworth Brewster (1865-1919), was a lawyer and Republican politician in St. Joseph, Missouri, serving in the Missouri state senate 1895-1899 and running for Congress in 1898. Sardius' younger siblings were Annie Byard Brewster Morgan (1873-1946) and Reginald Raymond Brewster (1876-1946), a lawyer and politician in Kansas City, Missouri who was the Republican candidate for U. S. Senate in 1922, losing to Democratic incumbent James A. Reed. Sardius Brewster attended Highland College in Highland, Kansas and was admitted to the Doniphan County bar in 1897.

== Career ==
Brewster served five terms as Doniphan County attorney, from 1898 to 1908. In 1908 and 1910 he was elected state senator from Doniphan and Brown counties. From 1911 to 1915 he served as assistant attorney general of Kansas. In 1915 he won election as Kansas attorney general and served two two-year terms. After this he returned to private practice. He soon joined a firm in Topeka which became "Wheeler, Brewster, Hunt & Goodell", which exists today as Goodell Stratton Edmonds & Palmer.

In 1930 he was appointed United States District Attorney for Kansas and served in that post until 1933. On August 7, 1933, Brewster informed Kansas governor Alf Landon that federal investigators suspected that forged copies had been made of bonds held in the Kansas state treasury, but that Kansas treasurer Tom Boyd was not allowing federal agents to inspect the bonds in the state vault.

Landon ordered the treasurer to allow the federal agents to investigate, and this led to the Great Kansas Bond Scandal of 1933–4. After Brewster's term as district attorney was over, Landon recruited him to lead the successful prosecution of Ronald Finney, his father, and others for forging copies of over a million dollars in bonds. The Finney family were prominent Kansas bankers and close friends of Landon and of his backer, newspaperman William Allen White.

== Family ==
Sardius married Caroline May Brown (1871-1918) on February 1, 1899. They had six children, of whom four lived to adulthood - Caroline Veda Brewster Fleeker (1900-1970), Arthur Seeley Brewster (1901-1974), Madge Adele Brewster Morgan (1903-1987), and Annie Brewster Dolman (1906-2010).

== Description ==
Brewster was described as "unkempt", but capable of reciting extensive chunks of Shakespeare verbatim and of reading the Greek and Latin authors in their original languages. He had a record of being an aggressive prosecutor; a reporter said, "Eating breakfast with a grizzly bear is a joy as compared to being on the opposite side of a rough and tumble lawsuit with Brewster."
