= Amy F. Cline =

American judge (born 1974)

Judge of the Kansas Court of Appeals
- Incumbent
- Assumed office February 26, 2021
- Appointed by: Laura Kelly
- Preceded by: Joseph Pierron

Personal details
- Born: April 3, 1974 (age 52) Wichita, Kansas, U.S.
- Education: Wichita State University (BA); University of Kansas (JD)

Amy Fellows Cline (born April 3, 1974) is a Judge of the Kansas Court of Appeals.

== Education and legal career ==
Cline received her Bachelor of Arts magna cum laude from Wichita State University in 1996 and her Juris Doctor from the University of Kansas School of Law in 2000. After graduating law school, Cline joined Fleeson, Gooing, Coulson & Kitch, LLC, representing clients in civil litigation in both state and federal courts. In 2004, she then worked at Triplett Woolf Garretson, LLC, where she became a partner in 2008.

== Appointment to Kansas Court of Appeals ==
In June 2020, Cline was one of twenty candidates who submitted an application to fill the vacancy left by the retirement of Judge Steve Leben. On July 15, 2020, Governor Laura Kelly appointed Cline to be a judge of the Kansas Court of Appeals to the seat vacated by Judge Joseph Pierron who retired. She was confirmed by the Kansas Senate on January 21, 2021, and sworn in on February 26, 2021, by Chief Judge Karen Arnold-Burger.

Legal offices
Preceded by Joseph Pierron	Judge of the Kansas Court of Appeals; 2021–present	Incumbent
