= Kansas City Kansas Community College =

Public college in Wyandotte County, Kansas, US

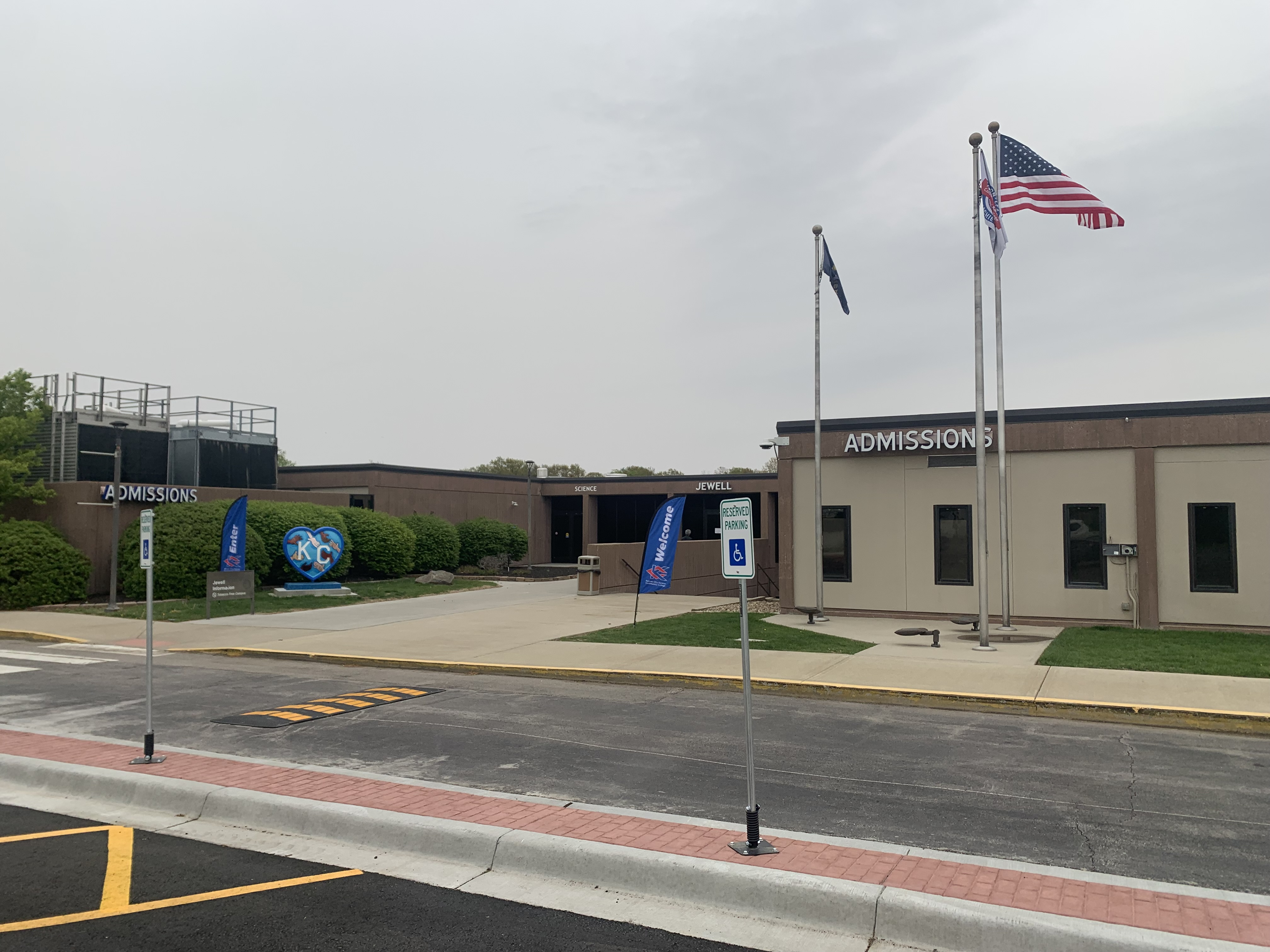
- KCKCC campus in Kansas City, Kansas in 2025
- Motto: Making Life Better
- Type: Community College
- Established: 1923
- President: Jackie Vietti (acting)
- Students: 4,807 (Fall 2023)
- Location: Wyandotte County, Kansas, United States; 39.1218°N 94.7486°W
- Campus: Urban
- Colors: Blue & red
- Mascot: Blue Devil
- Website: www.kckcc.edu

Kansas City Kansas Community College (KCKCC) is a public two year community college in Wyandotte County, Kansas, United States. The college is accredited by the Higher Learning Commission, a commission of the North Central Association and the Kansas Board of Regents.

KCKCC has its own police force, the Kansas City Kansas Community College Police, which was established to protect KCKCC community and property.

== History ==
Kansas City Kansas Community College was founded in 1923 as a junior college within the Kansas City, Kansas Public School system by Superintendent M.E. Pearson. The college initially operated as two segregated divisions: the Central division for white students at Wyandotte High School and the Sumner division for Black students at Sumner High School. The inaugural class consisted of 56 students taught by high school instructors. In 1951, Superintendent F.L. Schlagle integrated the college divisions, citing low enrollment during the Korean War. That same year, the institution received its first accreditation from the North Central Association of Colleges and Schools.

In 1965, the college joined the Kansas statewide community junior college system. This led to the 1967 establishment of an independent Board of Trustees and the expansion of the college district to include all of Wyandotte County. Following a 1968 bond approval, the college opened a West Campus at 72nd and State Avenue in 1972 to address overcrowding; this became the primary campus after the downtown location closed in 1973. The college added a nursing program in 1970 and, in 2008, absorbed the Kansas City, Kansas Area Vocational Technical School to form the KCKCC Technical Education Center (TEC). The TEC moved to the former Walmart at 65th and State Avenue in 2013, and the Leavenworth campus transitioned to the Pioneer Career Center in 2015. In 2022, the college completed Centennial Hall, its first on-campus residential facility.

== Buildings ==
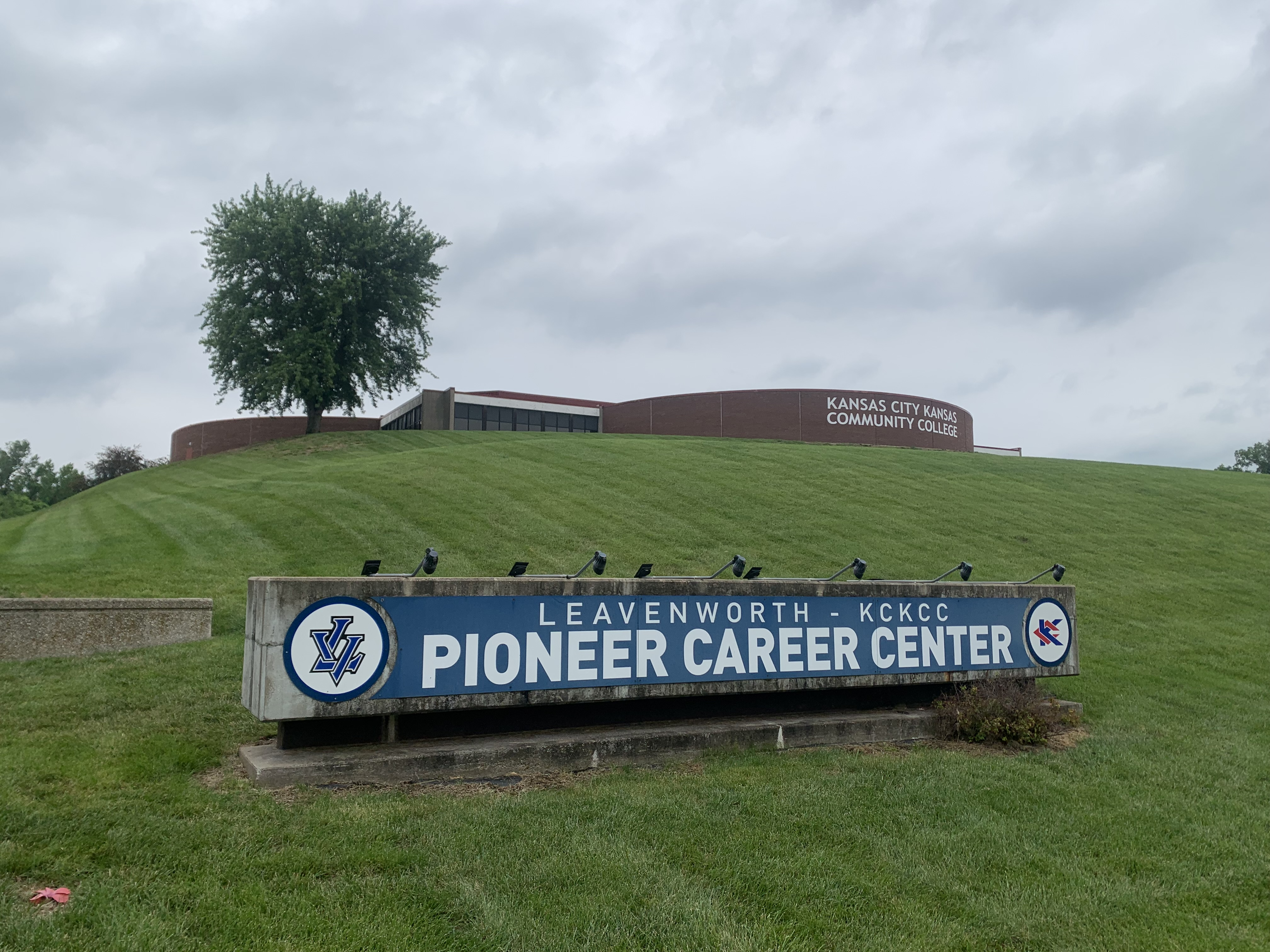
Pioneer Career Center of Kansas City Kansas Community College in Leavenworth, Kansas

The main buildings of KCKCC are all dedicated to someone who was an important part of KCKCC's history.

Name of building	Function of building
Humanities Building	Division of Arts, Humanities, & Social Sciences; classrooms
Henry M. Louis Social & Behavioral Sciences Building	Administration building, classrooms
Jewell Student Center	Bookstore, dining services, Student Services
Science Building	Science and Lab classrooms, Campus Police
Mathematics Building	Division of Mathematics Science Computer Technology Business and Continuing Education; Mathematics classrooms
Performing Arts Center	Theatre Department and Media Services
Nursing Building	Division of Nursing and Allied Health
Flint Building	Business classrooms; Mortuary Science classrooms
Field House	Athletic Department and Gymnasium
Learning Commons	Library services; TRIO Student Support Services resources, Learning Resource Center; Center for Teaching Excellence
Allied Health Building	Division of Nursing and Allied Health, Student Recreation Center
Community Education Building	Classrooms
Mary Ann Flunder Lodge by the Lake	Conference Center
Credit Union	Bank services
Campus Child Care Center	Child care services

== Athletics ==
The official mascot for the Kansas City Kansas Community College is the Blue Devils. The college has 8 sports. They participate in the National Junior College Athletic Association (NJCAA) and the Kansas Jayhawk Community College Conference. The women's basketball team won the NJCAA Division II Women's Basketball National Championship in 2016 and 2019.

== Notable alumni ==
- Fana Ashby, Trinidadian and Tobaganian sprinter
- Damion Barry, track & field medalist
- David E. Bruns, judge of the Kansas Court of Appeals
- Tom Burroughs,former member of the Kansas House of Representatives
- Mark Jelks, track & field medalist
- Sam Kass, NBC News senior food analyst and former president Barack Obama's Senior Policy Advisor for Nutrition Policy,
- Sherridan Kirk, track & field medalist
- Quincy Morgan, former professional football player
- Cindy Neighbor, former member of the Kansas House of Representatives
- Melissa Oropeza, current member of the Kansas House of Representatives
- Irene C. Peden, first American woman engineer or scientist to conduct research in the Antarctic
- David Segui, former professional baseball player
- Kevin Young, former professional baseball player
- Valdenia Winn, former member of the Kansas House of Representatives
