= Stephen D. Hill =

American judge

Stephen D. Hill (born December 18, 1950, in Fort Scott, Kansas) is a judge of the Kansas Court of Appeals. He was appointed by Governor Kathleen Sebelius in 2003.

== Legal career ==
Hill started his own law firm, Hill & Wisler, in 1975. The next year, he became a Linn County Attorney. In 1981, he was appointed Associate District Judge in the Sixth Judicial District of Kansas. He became a District Judge the following year. He later became an Administrative Judge and then the Chief Judge of the district.

== Biography ==
Hill graduated from the University of Kansas with a B.A. in English in 1972. He went on to receive his J.D. from the Washburn University School of Law in 1975. He is now married and has two adult sons.
