= Karen Arnold-Burger =

American judge (born 1957)

Chief Judge of the Kansas Court of Appeals
- In office January 9, 2017 – January 13, 2025
- Preceded by: Thomas E. Malone
- Succeeded by: Sarah E. Warner

Judge of the Kansas Court of Appeals
- Incumbent
- Assumed office March 4, 2011
- Appointed by: Mark Parkinson
- Preceded by: Gary W. Rulon

Personal details
- Born: 1957 (age 67–68); Kansas City, Kansas, U.S.
- Education: University of Kansas (BA, JD)

Karen Arnold-Burger (born 1957) is a judge of the Kansas Court of Appeals.

== Education and legal career ==
Arnold-Burger received her bachelor's degrees from the University of Kansas in 1978 and her Juris Doctor from the University of Kansas School of Law in 1981. Arnold-Burger served as First Assistant City Attorney for the City of Overland Park before accepting a position as an Assistant United States Attorney in Kansas City, Kansas. She was appointed to the Overland Park Municipal Court in 1991, and was appointed Presiding Judge of that court in 1996.

== Appointment to Kansas Court of Appeals ==
Arnold-Burger was one of three nominees recommended for a seat on the Kansas Court of Appeals. She was appointed to the court by Governor Mark Parkinson on January 6, 2011 to the seat vacated by former Chief Judge Gary W. Rulon and was sworn in on March 4, 2011. Arnold-Burger was retained on November 6, 2012, and again on November 8, 2016. Her current four-year term expires on January 10, 2021.

She was selected by the Kansas Supreme Court as chief judge of the court of appeals for a four-year term beginning in January 2017.

== Consideration for Kansas Supreme Court ==
Arnold-Burger was one of five candidates recommended by the Supreme Court Nominating Commission for a seat on the Kansas Supreme Court vacated by Nancy Moritz.

== Teaching ==
She has been an adjunct faculty member at the National Judicial College since 2000, and was elected by her fellow faculty members to serve on the Faculty Council beginning in 2010.

== Personal ==
She was born in Kansas City, Kansas in 1957. She and her husband have been married for 37 years and have three grown children and one grandchild.

== See also ==
- 2020 Kansas elections

Legal offices
Preceded by Gary W. Rulon	Judge of the Kansas Court of Appeals; 2011–present	Incumbent
Preceded by Thomas E. Malone	Chief Judge of the Kansas Court of Appeals; 2017–2025	Succeeded by Sarah E. Warner
