= Sarah Warner =

Sarah Warner may refer to:

- Sass Warner (Sarah Warner), a fictional character on the New Zealand soap opera Shortland Street.
- Sarah E. Warner, chief judge of the Kansas Court of Appeals
