= Jerry Elliott =

American judge

Kansas Court of Appeals Judge
- In office September 11, 1987 – April 5, 2010
- Appointed by: Mike Hayden
- Succeeded by: G. Gordon Atcheson

Personal details
- Born: November 25, 1936 Fort Scott, Kansas
- Died: April 5, 2010 (aged 73) Lawrence, Kansas
- Party: Republican
- Spouse: Debra Duncan
- Education: The University of Kansas

Military service
- Branch/service: United States Navy
- Rank: Lieutenant

Jerry G. Elliott (November 25, 1936 – April 5, 2010) was a judge on the Kansas Court of Appeals. Elliot served on this court from 1987 until his death.

== Biography ==
Jerry Elliott was born in Fort Scott, Kansas. He graduated with an A.B. degree from the University of Kansas in 1958. He earned his law (LL.B.) degree from the same school in 1964. He was an ROTC student and served active duty in the Navy. He was married to his wife Debra Duncan and had one son.

Elliott has been president of the Wichita Council of Camp Fire, the Kansas chapter of the Leukemia Society of America, the Wichita Legal Aid Society, the Wichita Bar Association, and a board member of Music Theatre of Wichita

== Legal career ==
After law school, Judge Elliott worked as a law clerk for Judge Wesley E. Brown of the U.S. District Court in Wichita, Kansas. In 1966, he joined the law firm Foulston, Siefkin, Powers & Eberhardt where he focused on appellate practice and creditors' rights.

He received the Kansas Bar Association President's Outstanding Service Award in 1982 and 1995, and the Phil Lewis Medal of Distinction in 2004

== Death ==
Jerry Elliott died in Lawrence, Kansas on April 5, 2010, after a long battle with cancer.

Legal offices
New seat	Kansas Court of Appeals Judge; 1987–2010	Succeeded by G. Gordon Atcheson
