= Caleb Stegall =

American judge (born 1971)

Justice of the Kansas Supreme Court
- Incumbent
- Assumed office December 5, 2014
- Appointed by: Sam Brownback
- Preceded by: Nancy Moritz

Judge of the Kansas Court of Appeals
- In office January 3, 2014 – December 5, 2014
- Appointed by: Sam Brownback
- Preceded by: Seat established
- Succeeded by: Kathryn A. Gardner

Personal details
- Born: September 20, 1971 (age 55) Topeka, Kansas, U.S.
- Party: Republican
- Education: Geneva College (BA); University of Kansas (JD)

Caleb Stegall (born September 20, 1971) is an American attorney and writer who resides in Perry, Kansas. He has served as the district attorney for Jefferson County, Kansas, and chief counsel to Governor Sam Brownback before he was appointed to a new seat on the Kansas Court of Appeals. On August 29, 2014, Stegall was appointed by Governor Brownback to the Kansas Supreme Court, replacing Nancy Moritz, who had been appointed by President Barack Obama to the United States Court of Appeals for the Tenth Circuit.

== Early life ==
Born in Lawrence, Kansas, Stegall is a lifelong resident of Douglas and Jefferson counties, in northeastern Kansas.

In Douglas County, Stegall attended and graduated from Lawrence High School in Lawrence, Kansas.

== Law practice ==
When Stegall was appointed, the Kansas Democratic Party issued a release criticizing Brownback for the appointment because of his connection to the disbarred attorney Phill Kline. He represented the State of Kansas in litigation with environmentalists over the permitting of coal-fired power plants. Stegall represented eight American missionaries detained in Haiti following the 2010 Haiti earthquake who were accused by Haitian officials of trying to take children to the Dominican Republic without proper documentation. In 2008, he successfully defended the former executive director of the Kansas Republican Party in a dispute over Kansas campaign finance rules. In 2007, he was the lead counsel in the Kansas Supreme Court trial of former Kansas Attorney General Phill Kline based on perjury, an illegal file transfer, and misleading legal guidance. In 2008, Stegall represented a group of residents against the public financing of casino operations in Kansas City, Kansas.

In 2008, he represented a church that challenged local regulations on the church's operations as a homeless shelter. In 2009, he represented a teacher who claimed not to have been rehired because of his conservative political beliefs. As district attorney, he filed charges in 2009 against a county commissioner charged with theft by deception. In 2010, he was involved with a federal and state investigation of a distributor of "ethnobotanicals" who was accused of selling a synthetic cannabis.

He has worked as general counsel for Americans for Prosperity and on the executive committee of Audubon of Kansas.

== Politics ==
Stegall has been identified as an advocate for traditionalist conservatism and a "prairie populist." In 2004, he was profiled on the front page of The New York Times as one of a young generation of conservatives questioning Republican Party orthodoxy. On January 12, 2009, Stegall began his first term as Jefferson County District Attorney. He has been characterized by the blog Firedoglake as a "rising religious-right political star," has been suggested as a possible candidate for US Senate in 2010 by Rod Dreher, and has been described as representing a new path for the Republican Party in the post-Bush years.

In 2022, Stegall left his adjunct position at the University of Kansas School of Law, citing handling of a controversy over a conservative campus speaker.

== Religion ==
Stegall is a ruling elder in the Evangelical Presbyterian Church. He has been described as a "lifelong conservative Presbyterian" whose faith and life are "strongly countercultural to mainstream Evangelicalism" although he still identifies himself as an evangelical.

== Writings ==
In 2003, Stegall created and founded, with others, an online journal of religion, politics, and culture called The New Pantagruel. In 2006, Stegall and The New Pantagruel were featured in Rod Dreher's book, Crunchy Cons, as leaders in the resurgence of traditionalist conservatism. Though The New Pantagruel was discontinued at the end of 2006, Stegall's writing continues to appear in conservative papers, magazines, and journals including National Review Online, Christianity Today, The Intercollegiate Review, The American Conservative, Taki's Magazine, and Touchstone Magazine. Stegall authors a semi-regular column on Kansas politics for the independent publication Kansas Liberty.

== Notes ==
Legal offices
Preceded by Nancy Moritz	Justice of the Kansas Supreme Court; 2014–present	Incumbent
