= Patrick McAnany =

American judge

Patrick D. McAnany (born November 18, 1943, Sweetwater, Texas) was a former judge on the Kansas Court of Appeals. He was appointed by Governor Kathleen Sebelius, and took office in 2004. He retired from office on January 13, 2019.

McAnany graduated from Rockhurst University in 1965 with a degree in philosophy. He then attended the University of Missouri at Kansas City, where he earned his Juris Doctor in 1968 and his Master of Laws in business litigation in 1971.

Judge McAnany began his legal career with the law firm Miller & O'Laughlin. He then worked in the office of the general counsel for Mobil Oil Corporation. In 1973, he joined the firm McAnany, Van Cleave & Phillips, practicing general civil and business litigation. McAnany was appointed to the Johnson County District Court in 1995, serving two terms as chief judge on before being appointed to the Court of Appeals.

McAnany died on September 4, 2023. He was married and had two children.
