= Diana Carlin =

American academic (born 1950)

Diana B. Carlin
- Born: June 25, 1950 (age 76); Pittsburg, Kansas
- Occupation: Academic
- Title: Professor
- Spouse: Joseph Pierron

Academic background
- Education: University of Nebraska–Lincoln; University of Kansas

Academic work
- Discipline: Communication Studies
- Sub-discipline: Political Communication
- Institutions: Saint Louis University (2011 - 2015); University of Kansas (1987 - 2011)

Diana B. Carlin (born June 25, 1950) is a Professor Emerita of Communication at Saint Louis University. She is known for her work centering on debate communication, specifically her focus on political debates. Carlin has authored several scholarly articles, and has co-authored several books, including her most recent, Gender and the American Presidency: Nine Presidential Women and the Barriers They Faced. Carlin has also been featured in The New York Times regarding the value of debate. Carlin views presidential debates as valuable due to their ability to summarize a candidates platform, put both candidates on display at once, and show how candidates respond to unexpected or difficult questions when unprepared.

== Focus of Research ==
Much of Carlin's research looks at politics and the role that communication plays in it. Many of her articles concern practices used in presidential debates. She has participated in research looking at perceptions and reactions to Presidential debates during campaigns from 1992 to 2008. Carlin was the lead author on The Third Agenda in U.S. Presidential Debates: DebateWatch and Viewer Reactions, 1996-2004, which looked at viewer feedback of the 1996, 2000, and 2004 debates, and examined how the feedback could have affected candidate performance. She has also coauthored textbooks on debate communication and public speaking for educational use.

Carlin also examines gender with an attempt to understand the biases and issues that it causes in politics. Of note is her research that considers gender's influence in Presidential campaign coverage. A popular article that she co-authored with Kelly Winfrey of the University of Kansas, "Have You Come a Long Way, Baby? Hillary Clinton, Sarah Palin, and Sexism in 2008 Campaign Coverage" looks at the sexism and stereotypes that were present in the 2008 election. The article found that sexism targeted both Hillary Clinton and Sarah Palin, with Clinton receiving criticism for her stern demeanor and age, and Palin being thought of largely as a cheerleader for John McCain. The article concluded that society needs to attack this sexism head on, and that the media needs to be more aware of the sexism present in their information distribution.

Carlin has also co-authored the book, Gender and the American Presidency: Nine Presidential Women and the Barriers They Faced. The book looks at multiple women that the authors deemed possible Presidential contenders and examines the reasons that they struggled to achieve the status.

== Journal Editor ==
- Editorial Board of the Western Journal of Communication

== Awards and honors ==
Carlin has received many awards throughout her career in academics. Carlin was a recipient of the Mortar Board Outstanding Educator Award at the University of Kansas in 1998. Additionally, Carlin received a Steeples Award for Service to Kansas in 1999. She was named a KU Woman of Distinction in 2007, an award for accomplished women of the University of Kansas. Additionally, Carlin has received a TIAA-CREF Faculty Award, an Outstanding Faculty Award from the Central States Communication Association, and College of Liberal Arts & Sciences Graduate Mentor Award.

== See also ==
- Sexism in American Political Elections
- United States presidential debates, 2008
