= David E. Bruns =

American judge

Judge of the Kansas Court of Appeals
- Incumbent
- Assumed office June 3, 2011
- Appointed by: Sam Brownback
- Preceded by: Nancy Moritz

Judge of the Kansas District Court for Shawnee County
- In office September 1999 – June 3, 2011
- Appointed by: Bill Graves

Personal details
- Born: September 17, 1959 (age 66) Kansas City, Kansas
- Education: Kansas City Kansas Community College, A.A. University of Kansas, B.S. Washburn University School of Law, J.D.

David E. Bruns (born September 17, 1959) is a Judge of the Kansas Court of Appeals.

== Early life and education ==
Bruns was born September 17, 1959, in Kansas City, Kansas. He earned an Associate of Arts in pre-law from Kansas City Kansas Community College in 1979 and a Bachelor of Science in education from the University of Kansas in 1981. He received his Juris Doctor with honors from Washburn University School of Law in 1984.

== Legal career ==
Upon admission to the practice of law in 1984, he joined the Topeka law firm of Goodell, Stratton, Edmonds and Palmer, LLP, where he became a partner in 1989. In private practice, he primarily handled litigation and health law cases in the state and federal courts of Kansas and Missouri.

== State court service ==
In September 1999, Governor Bill Graves appointed him to serve as judge of the District Court of Shawnee County, Kansas. Judge Bruns was subsequently retained in office by the voters of Shawnee County in 2000, 2004 and 2008. As a trial court judge, he presided over a variety of cases, including the first grand jury convened in Shawnee County in more than 10 years and a multistate class action lawsuit involving one of the largest management-led buyouts in corporate history.

== Appointment to Kansas Court of Appeals ==
He was appointed to the court by Governor Sam Brownback on April 15, 2011. He was officially sworn in on June 3, 2011. Bruns was retained in office by the voters of Kansas in the 2012 and 2016 general elections. Since joining the appellate court in June 2011, Judge Bruns has authored more than 500 opinions.

== Personal ==
Bruns and his wife, Shawn, have been married for more than 35 years. They have two adult children, a daughter-in-law, and a granddaughter.

== See also ==
- 2020 Kansas elections

Legal offices
Unknown	Judge of the Kansas Court of Appeals; 2011–present	Incumbent
