= Josie Badger =

American disability rights advocate

- Education: Geneva College (Disability Law and Advocacy); University of Pittsburgh (Rehabilitation Counseling); Duquesne University (Doctorate in Healthcare Ethics)
- Occupations: Disability Rights Advocate; Co-director at the RAISE Center; Youth Director at The Parent Education & Advocacy Leadership Center
- Employers: RAISE Center; The Parent Education & Advocacy Leadership Center
- Known for: Advocacy for Disability Rights; Ms. Wheelchair America 2011; Co-founding Pennsylvania Youth Leadership Network
- Awards: Athena Young Professional Award (2015); Ms. Wheelchair America (2011)

Josie Badger is the co-director at the national RAISE Center. She is active and engaged in the Pittsburgh disability rights community.

== Education ==
Badger co-founded a community service club at age 12 to train service dogs for those with disabilities. Badger earned her degree in Disability Law and Advocacy from Geneva College in 2007. She received her graduate degree in Rehabilitation Counseling from the University of Pittsburgh and later earned her doctorate in Healthcare Ethics at Duquesne University in 2014. Badger is one of eight people in the world born with a rare form of the genetic disorder muscular dystrophy.

== Career ==
Badger worked on Launching Into Adulthood: An Integrated Response to Support Transition of Youth With Chronic Health Conditions and Disabilities, a project of the Centers for Disease Control and Prevention. She co-founded the Pennsylvania Youth Leadership Network and the Children's Hospital Advisory Network for Guidance and Empowerment, serving as president and vice-president, and also was served as president and vice president of the National Youth Leadership Network. She has been recognized as an advocate on behalf of those with disabilities.

Badger is the Youth Director at The Parent Education & Advocacy Leadership Center and co-director of the national Rehabilitation Services Administration Parent Training and Information Center technical assistance center. She is the author of the TedxPittsburgh talk "Exceptional by Choice". She filed a suit against Preit Associates, LP for violating the Americans with Disabilities Act on January 3, 2017.

== Awards ==
- Athena Young Professional Award (2015)
- Ms. Wheelchair America (2011)
