= Steve Leben =

American attorney (born 1956)

Kansas Court of Appeals Judge
- In office June 15, 2007 – June 26, 2020
- Appointed by: Kathleen Sebelius
- Succeeded by: Lesley A. Isherwood

Personal details
- Born: June 23, 1956 (age 69) Eureka, Kansas
- Spouse: Ann Warner

Steve Leben (born June 23, 1956) is an American attorney. He served as a judge on the Kansas Court of Appeals from 2007 to 2020.

== Biography ==
Judge Leben was born on June 23, 1956, in Eureka, Kansas. He graduated from the University of Kansas with a B.S. in journalism in 1978. After a brief engagement as press secretary for a Kansas congressman, he returned to the University of Kansas and received his J.D. degree in 1982.

== Legal career ==
Judge Leben practiced law in the Kansas City area before becoming a judge. He practiced with the law firm Stinson, Mag & Fizzell for 6 years and then practiced on his own for five years. After this, he became a District Judge. He has served on various law associations and has written and edited numerous articles. He has also taught law classes at both the University of Kansas and University of Missouri-Kansas City law schools and was the president of the American Judges Association for a time.

== Kansas Court of Appeals ==
On February 12, 2020, Leben announced he would be leaving the court on June 26, 2020, to return to academia.
