= WGEV =

Beaver Falls, Pennsylvania; United States
- Broadcast area: Geneva College
- Frequency: 88.3 MHz

Programming
- Format: Defunct

Ownership
- Owner: Geneva College

History
- First air date: 1965

Technical information
- Facility ID: 23619
- Class: D
- ERP: 15 watts
- HAAT: 81 meters
- Transmitter coordinates: 40°46′21″N 80°18′33″W

WGEV was a college radio station that was owned by Geneva College in Beaver Falls, Pennsylvania. The station began broadcasting on November 15, 1965 at 12:30 pm. The station used to broadcast on 88.3 FM, but its license was canceled in September 2007. A class D station, WGEV applied for a power upgrade and move to class A status in 1989 but that move was rejected in July 1989 as it would have caused significant interference with the broadcast signal of WYSU in Youngstown, Ohio.

== Awards and honors ==
In 1995, WGEV was a finalist in the "creative production" category of the Marconi College Radio Awards. The station was honored for the program "Gospel Galaxy", a science fiction tale about the crew of a Christian starship whose mission is to spread the Gospel through music.

== WGEV today ==
WGEV moved operations to internet radio, but ceased operations in December 2013.
