= 2020 Kansas elections =

- November 3, 2020

Kansas state elections in 2020 were held on Tuesday, November 3, 2020. The deadline to register to vote was October 13, 2020. Early voting began October 14, 2020. Voters in Kansas are eligible to vote absentee, and there are no special eligibility criteria for doing so. Absentee ballots must be returned and received (in person or via mail) before November 2, 2020.

== Federal offices ==
=== President of the United States ===
Kansas has six electoral votes in the Electoral College. Nominees for the presidential election included Republican Donald Trump, Democrat Joe Biden, and Libertarian Jo Jorgensen. Republican Donald Trump won all the electoral votes, with 56% of the popular vote.

=== United States Senate ===
Kansas voted to replace retiring incumbent Republican Pat Roberts. Democrat Barbara Bollier, Republican Roger Marshall, and Libertarian Jason Buckley ran for this position in the general election. Republican Roger Marshall won with 53% of the vote.

=== United States House of Representatives ===
Kansas voters voted for four U.S. Representatives, one from each of the state's four congressional districts. 3 Republicans and 1 Democrat were returned. No seats changed hands.

U.S. House of Representatives nominees by district
District	Democratic nominee	Republican nominee	Libertarian Party
District 1	Kali Barnett	Tracey Mann Michael Soetaert (write-in)	
District 2	Michelle De La Isla	Jacob LaTurner	Robert Garrard
District 3	Sharice Davids, incumbent	Amanda Adkins	Steve Hohe
District 4	Laura Lombard	Ron Estes, incumbent	

== State offices ==
=== Kansas executive offices ===
Five seats in the State Board of Education were up for election in Kansas this general election.

State Board of Education nominees by district
District	Democratic nominee	Republican nominee
District 2	Melanie Haas	Benjamin Hodge
District 4	Ann Mah	Josh Harris
District 6	David Colburn	Deena Horst
District 8	Betty Arnold	Kathy Busch
District 10		Jim McNiece

=== Kansas Senate ===
All 40 seats in the Kansas Senate were up for election in 2020. Republicans won 29 seats and Democrats won 11 seats. There was no net seat change. Republicans gained Districts 18 and 19, while Democrats gained Districts 5 and 8.

=== Kansas House of Representatives ===
125 seats were up for election in the Kansas House of Representatives in the general election of 2020. In the election, the Democrats lost two seats and the Republicans gained two.

=== Kansas Supreme Court ===
There was one justice, Eric Rosen, of the Kansas Supreme Court whose appointment expired on January 10, 2021, which was up for retention in this general election.

=== Appellate courts ===
Five justices of the Kansas Court of Appeals had terms that expired on January 10, 2021. Their seats were up for retention this general election. The justices were Sarah Warner, David E. Bruns, G.Gordon Atcheson, Karen Arnold-Burger, and Kathryn Gardner.

== Kansas ballot measures ==
There were no statewide ballot measures certified for the 2020 general election in Kansas on November 3, 2020.
