= John Snarey =

Psychologist, academic, and author

- Occupations: Psychologist, academic and author

Academic background
- Education: B.S.Ed., Education and Psychology; M.A., Religion and Culture; Ed.M., Human Development and Culture; Ed.D., Human Development and Psychology; Post Doc., Psychiatry
- Alma mater: Geneva College; Wheaton College; Harvard University

Academic work
- Discipline: Psychology; Education
- Institutions: Northwestern University; Emory University

John Snarey is a psychologist, academic, and author. He is a Senior Research Psychologist and the Franklin N. Parker Professor Emeritus in the Candler School of Theology and the Laney Graduate Department of Psychology at Emory University.

Snarey is most known for his work in the social scientific study of human development, having done pioneering research on lifespan psychosocial development and generativity, on morality, moral development, and moral education, and the psychology of religion and faith development. He has authored and co-authored research papers and books such as Race-ing Moral Formation, How Fathers Care for The Next Generation, and Conflict and Continuity. Additionally, he is the recipient of the 1988 AERA Outstanding Human Development Research Award, the James Moran Award for Exceptional Research in Family Relations and Child Development from the American Association of Family and Consumer Sciences (AAFCS) in 1994, the 2003 GSU Marie C. Keel Award for Excellence in Mentoring in Educational Psychology, the 2007 Albert E. Levy Scientific Research Award from Emory University and the Association for Moral Education Kuhmerker Career Award in 2014.

Snarey is a Fellow of the American Psychological Association (APA) and the American Educational Research Association (AERA). He was a Founding Cohort Member of the William James Society and has been a member of the William James Studies Editorial Board since 2005.

== Early life ==
Snarey was born in New Brighton, Pennsylvania, and spent his boyhood in the town's New England Hill neighborhood. Snarey graduated from New Brighton High School. His father was a steelworker and union officer.

== Education and early career ==
Snarey earned a B.S. in Education with a concentration in Psychology from Geneva College in 1969 and an M.A. in Religion and Culture in 1973 from Wheaton College, where he became an instructor in the Department of Sociology and Anthropology in 1974. Between 1975 and 1981, he worked as a Teaching Fellow at Harvard College and the Harvard Graduate School of Education, where he obtained an Ed.D. in Human Development and Psychology in 1982 and was awarded the Exemplary Dissertation Award from the National Council for the Social Studies and the Kuhmerker Dissertation Award from the Association for Moral Education. From 1982 to 1984, he completed a Postdoctoral Clinical Research Fellowship in Psychiatry at Harvard Medical School.

== Career ==
Snarey held positions as a Research Associate at Harvard's Graduate School of Education and an Associate Research Psychologist at Wellesley College until 1985; he then served as an associate professor of Human Development and Education at Northwestern University until 1987, when he joined Emory University as an associate professor of Human Development and Ethics. He was promoted to full Professor in 1995 and was awarded a named chair, the Franklin N. Parker Professor of Human Development and Ethics, in 2014. He has been serving as Senior Research Psychologist and the Franklin N. Parker Professor Emeritus since 2023.

Snarey was the Chair of the Department of Theology and Personality from 1994 to 1996 and subsequently assumed the role of Director of the Honors and Thesis Programs until 2001. In 2001, he was elected as the Chair of the Emory University Faculty Council and President of the Emory University Senate until 2005, concurrently working as the Director of the Moral Cognition, Development, and Education Lab from 2004 to 2015.

== Research ==
Snarey has contributed to the field of psychology by studying psychosocial development across the life cycle, the psychology of moral development and decision-making, and the psychology of religious and nonreligious faith development, using longitudinal, cross-cultural, and neuroimaging methods.

=== Psychology of the human life cycle ===
Snarey has studied the psychology of the human life cycle throughout his career. In the book How Fathers Care for The Next Generation: A Four-Decade Study (published in 1993), he analyzed the role of fathers in children's development over four decades and generations, emphasizing social-emotional, intellectual-academic, and physical-athletic aspects, and defining characteristics of supportive paternal engagement. David Popenoe stated, "For those who hold the view that fathers are superfluous, or for anyone who wants to read an extraordinarily rich discussion of the importance of fathering, this book is strongly recommended." He also investigated the coping strategies of married men facing infertility, finding that earlier coping methods predict later parenting resolutions and midlife achievement of psychosocial generativity.

In response to Nancy Snow's retelling of Clarence Darrow's negative take on parental generativity, Snarey concluded that both modeling and reworking processes influence the course of generativity. With Victoria Lasser, he examined how parent behavior influences ego development in adolescent girls during the transition to college, highlighting the importance of considering the dynamics within the father-daughter-mother triangle.

=== Psychology of morality ===
Snarey researched the psychology of morality by analyzing moral education, moral development, justice and care ethics, with a theoretical focus on Lawrence Kohlberg's theories. He reviewed cross-cultural research on moral reasoning, supporting Kohlberg's claim of universal moral development while noting biases and emphasizing the need for a developmental perspective on sociocultural systems. In addition, in 1987 and 1988, he contributed to a two-volume set, which presented the system of classifying moral judgment built up by Lawrence Kohlberg and his associates over a period of twenty years. Georg Lind commented, "These volumes present an unprecedented methodology for understanding moral-cognitive development. Developmental, school and clinical psychologists will find it very useful."

In 2004, with Vanessa Siddle Walker, Snarey co-edited Race-ing Moral Formation: African American Perspectives on Care and Justice, which examined moral development and education within the African American community, challenging existing notions and offering insights to promote moral reasoning and justice in schools. In a review for the Journal of the American Educational Studies Association, Sylvia Jones called it "a splendid center for academic discourse on marginalization". He also worked alongside colleagues, using fMRI to show that moral sensitivity, essential for ethical decisions, correlates with specific brain activations, differing for justice and care moral issues.

=== Psychology of religion ===
Snarey's work on the psychology of religion has focused on William James and his writings, especially the varieties of religious experiences, as well as on pragmatism, religious education, and faith development. Alongside Lynn Bridgers, he analyzed James' spiritual journey through his family history, emphasizing his father's conversion to Emmanuel Swedenborg's religious beliefs and how James' writing process contributed to his own moral and religious evolution. With Katie Givens Kime, he proposed applying James' perspective to address reductionism in neuropsychological studies of religion, advocating interdisciplinary collaboration among neuroscientists, scholars, and psychosocial scientists. Additionally, he and Joel McLendon analyzed William James's Gifford Lectures at the University of Edinburgh to understand them as separate performances, using first-hand accounts and a word-count method to illuminate James's perspectives and experiences during each lecture.

Snarey's empirical studies of religion also used cross-cultural research methods. His cross-cultural study of faith development, as conceptualized by James Fowler, focused on the faith of Jewish non-theists in Israel and the United States, discovering tentative support for the legitimacy of Fowler's faith development model, and establishing that the construct validity of Fowler's model and measure was adequate for research purposes.

Snarey's study of religious ethics in 186 societies paired the ideas of William James with those of sociologist Max Weber, revealing that environmental water scarcity predicted beliefs in a morally concerned supreme deity.

== Awards and honors ==
- 1988 – Outstanding Human Development Research Award, American Educational Research Association (AERA)
- 1994 – James Moran Award for Exceptional Research in Family Relations and Child Development, American Association of Family and Consumer Sciences (AAFCS)
- 2003 – Marie C. Keel Award for Excellence in Mentoring in Educational Psychology, GSU
- 2007 – Albert E. Levy Scientific Research Award, Emory University
- 2014 – Kuhmerker Career Award, Association for Moral Education (AME)

== Bibliography ==
=== Selected books ===
- Conflict and Continuity: A History of Ideas on Social Equality and Human Development (1981) ISBN 978-0916690175
- Remembrances of Lawrence Kohlberg (1988) ISBN 978-0962111303
- How Fathers Care for The Next Generation: A Four-Decade Study (1993) ISBN 978-0674409408
- Race-ing Moral Formation: African American Perspectives on Care and Justice (2004) ISBN 978-0807744499
- The Measurement of Moral Judgment: Volume 2 (2011) ISBN 978-0521169103

=== Selected articles ===
- Kohlberg, L., Ricks, D., & Snarey, J. (1984). Childhood development as a predictor of adaptation in adulthood. Genetic Psychology Monographs.
- Snarey, J. R. (1985). Cross-cultural universality of social-moral development: a critical review of Kohlbergian research. Psychological Bulletin, 97(2), 202.
- Snarey, J. R., & Vaillant, G. E. (1985). How lower-and working-class youth become middle-class adults: The association between ego defense mechanisms and upward social mobility. Child Development, 899–910.
- Snarey, J. (1991). Faith development, moral development, and nontheistic Judaism: An empirical study. Handbook of moral behavior and development (Vol. 2, pp. 279–305). Hillsdale, NJ: Erlbaum.
- Snarey, J. (1996). The natural environment's impact on religious ethics: A cross-cultural study. Journal for the Scientific Study of Religion, 35(2), 85–96.
- Gibbs, J. C., Basinger, K. S., Grime, R. L., & Snarey, J. R. (2007). "Moral judgment development across cultures: Revisiting Kohlberg's universality claims". Developmental Review, 27(4), 443–500.
- Robertson, D., Snarey, J., Ousley, O., Harenski, K., Bowman, F. D., Gilkey, R., & Kilts, C. (2007). The neural processing of moral sensitivity to issues of justice and care. Neuropsychologia, 45(4), 755–766.
- Coleman, A. & Snarey, J. (2011). James-Lange theory of emotions. In Encyclopedia of child behavior and development (Vol. 2, pp. 844–846). New York: Springer-Verlag.
- Meierdiercks, M. L. L., & Snarey, J. R. (2019). James, William and the Phenomenology of Religious Experience. Encyclopedia of Psychology and Religion, 1–4.
- Snarey, J. R., & McLendon, J. (2024). William James's experience of presenting The Varieties of Religious Experience: His Gifford performance in historical context. History of Psychology.
