= KOMB =

- Fort Scott, Kansas; United States
- Broadcast area: Southeast Kansas and Linn County, KS and Miami County, KS and portions of Southwest Missouri, including Nevada.
- Frequency: 103.9 MHz
- Branding: All Hit 103.9

Programming
- Format: Classic hits

Ownership
- Owner: Fort Scott Broadcasting Co., Inc.
- Sister stations: KMDO

History
- First air date: 1971

Technical information
- Licensing authority: FCC
- Facility ID: 22096
- Class: C3
- ERP: 25,000 watts
- HAAT: 100 meters (330 ft)
- Transmitter coordinates: 37°54′30.00″N 94°45′58.00″W

Links
- Public license information: Public file; LMS
- Webcast: Listen Live
- Website: kombfm.com

KOMB (103.9 FM) is a radio station broadcasting a classic hits format. Licensed to Fort Scott, Kansas, United States, it serves the Pittsburg area. The station is currently owned by Fort Scott Broadcasting Co., Inc..
