= Kathryn Gardner =

American judge

Kathryn A. Gardner

Judge of the Kansas Court of Appeals
- Incumbent
- Assumed office March 11, 2015
- Appointed by: Sam Brownback
- Preceded by: Caleb Stegall

Personal details
- Born: October 9, 1956 (age 69) Sterling, Kansas
- Education: Geneva College (B.A.); University of Kansas School of Law (J.D.)

Kathryn A. Gardner (born October 9, 1956) is a judge of the Kansas Court of Appeals.

== Education and legal career ==
Gardner earned her Bachelor of Arts in English from Geneva College and taught high school English before attending law school. She received her Juris Doctor from the University of Kansas School of Law in 1983. She began her legal career in 1983 as a research attorney for Kansas Court of Appeals Judge Joe Haley Swinehart. She then served as an assistant attorney general before relocating to Wichita where served as chambers law clerk to United States District Court for the District of Kansas Judge Sam A. Crow. In 1988, she joined the law firm of Martin, Pringle as an associate and left as a partner in 2000. When Gardner returned to Topeka that year, she again served as chambers law clerk to Judge Crow.

== Appointment to Kansas Court of Appeals ==
Gardner was appointed to the Court of Appeals by Governor Sam Brownback on January 29, 2015, and her nomination was confirmed on March 11, 2015. She was appointed to the seat vacated by Caleb Stegall who was elevated to the Kansas Supreme Court.

Gardner was required to stand for retention by voters in 2016 in order to remain on the bench. She was retained for a four-year term that began in January 2017 and expires on January 10, 2021.

== Personal ==
Gardner was born in Sterling, Kansas in 1956. She and her husband, Timothy, have been married for over 36 years and have three grown daughters and two granddaughters.

== See also ==
- 2020 Kansas elections

Legal offices
Preceded by Caleb Stegall	Judge of the Kansas Court of Appeals; 2015–present	Incumbent
