= Gary Rulon =

American judge (1941–2024)

Gary Wayne Rulon (May 18, 1941 – August 21, 2024) was an American judge. He served on the Kansas Court of Appeals, after being appointed in 1988, and promoted to Chief Judge in 2001. Rulon served until 2011.

== Background ==
Rulon was born on May 18, 1941, in Manhattan, Kansas, and grew up in Topeka. He received his B.A. degree in 1969 and his law degree in 1971 from Washburn University. He served in the U.S. Navy before beginning his legal career. He was married and has two daughters.

Rulon died in Olathe, Kansas, on August 21, 2024, at the age of 83.

== Legal career ==
From March 1972 until December 1979, Rulon worked as a private practice attorney in Emporia. He then became a staff attorney on the Central Staff of the United States Court of Appeals for the Tenth Circuit until August 1980. He went back to private practice in Emporia for a few months until January 1981, when he became an administrative judge on the 5th Judicial District of Kansas. He held this position until his appointment to the Court of Appeals.
