= KMDO =

- Fort Scott, Kansas; United States
- Broadcast area: Pittsburg, Kansas
- Frequency: 1600 kHz
- Branding: Red Dirt Country

Programming
- Format: Classic country

Ownership
- Owner: Fort Scott Broadcasting Company Inc.
- Sister stations: KOMB

History
- First air date: Oct. 7, 1954

Technical information
- Licensing authority: FCC
- Facility ID: 22097
- Class: D
- Power: 770 watts day 35 watts night
- Transmitter coordinates: 37°47′1.00″N 94°42′0.00″W
- Translator: 98.3 K252FY (Fort Scott)

Links
- Public license information: Public file; LMS

KMDO (1600 AM) is a radio station broadcasting a classic country format. Licensed to Fort Scott, Kansas, United States, it serves the Pittsburg area. The station is currently owned by Fort Scott Broadcasting Company Inc.

On July 14, 2019, KMDO dropped its simulcast with classic hits-formatted KOMB and launched a classic country format, branded as "Red Dirt Country".
