= Courts of Kansas =

Courts of Kansas include:

State courts of Kansas

- Kansas Supreme Court
  - Kansas Court of Appeals
    - Kansas District Courts (31 districts)
      - Kansas Municipal Courts

Federal courts located in Kansas

- United States District Court for the District of Kansas
