= Sarah E. Warner =

American judge

Chief Judge of the Kansas Court of Appeals
- Incumbent
- Assumed office January 13, 2025
- Preceded by: Karen Arnold-Burger

Judge of the Kansas Court of Appeals
- Incumbent
- Assumed office August 8, 2019
- Appointed by: Laura Kelly
- Preceded by: Patrick McAnany

Personal details
- Education: University of Kansas (B.A.); Ave Maria School of Law (J.D.)

Sarah Emily Warner is the Chief Judge of the Kansas Court of Appeals.

== Education and legal career ==
Warner graduated in 2003 with honors and distinction from the University of Kansas, majoring in French, international studies, mathematics, and political science. She graduated magna cum laude from the Ave Maria School of Law in 2006. After graduating law school, she served as a law clerk to Chief Justice Robert E. Davis of the Kansas Supreme Court until 2009. From 2014 to 2019, she has practiced law in Lawrence, becoming a partner in her firm in 2014.

== Appointment to Kansas Court of Appeals ==
On April 30, 2019, Governor Laura Kelly appointed Warner to be a judge of the Kansas Court of Appeals to the seat vacated by retirement of Judge Patrick McAnany. On May 14, 2019, her nomination was submitted to the Kansas Senate. Governor Kelly's first nominee, Judge Jeffry Jack was rejected by the Senate. On May 28, 2019, she was voted out of committee by a 10–0 vote. She was confirmed by the Kansas Senate on May 29, 2019 and sworn into office on August 8, 2019. On November 21, 2024, she was selected to serve a 4-year term as the Chief Judge, effective on January 13, 2025.

Legal offices
Preceded by Patrick McAnany	Judge of the Kansas Court of Appeals; 2019–present	Incumbent
Preceded by Karen Arnold-Burger	Chief Judge of the Kansas Court of Appeals; 2025–present	Incumbent
