= Geneva College =

Christian college in Beaver Falls, Pennsylvania, US

Coordinates: 40.771°N 80.321°W

- Motto: Pro Christo et Patria
- Motto in English: For Christ and Country
- Type: Private college
- Established: 1848; 178 years ago
- Religious affiliation: Reformed Presbyterian Church of North America
- Academic affiliations: CCCU; CIC; NAICU
- Endowment: $44.2 million (2019)
- President: Calvin L. Troup
- Faculty: 96
- Students: 1,418
- Location: Beaver Falls, Pennsylvania, U.S.
- Campus: Suburban, 110 acres (45 ha)
- Colors: Gold, white and charcoal
- Nickname: Golden Tornadoes
- Sporting affiliations: NCAA Division III – PAC
- Mascot: Turbo the Tornado
- Website: geneva.edu

Geneva College is a private Christian college in Beaver Falls, Pennsylvania, United States. Founded in 1848 in Northwood, Ohio, the college moved to its present location in 1880. It enrolls about 1,400 undergraduates in over 30 majors, as well as graduate students in a handful of master's programs. The undergraduate curriculum emphasizes the humanities and the formation of a Reformed Christian worldview. It is the only undergraduate institution affiliated with the Reformed Presbyterian Church of North America.

== History ==
Geneva College was founded in 1848 in Northwood, Logan County, Ohio, by John Black Johnston, a minister of the RPCNA. The college was founded as "Geneva Hall", and was named after the Swiss center of the Reformed faith movement. After briefly closing during the American Civil War, the college continued operating in Northwood until 1880. By that time, the college leadership had begun a search for alternate locations that were closer to urban areas. After considering several locations in the Midwest, the denomination chose the College Hill neighborhood of Beaver Falls, Pennsylvania. The college constructed its current campus on land donated by the Harmony Society. Old Main, the oldest building on campus, was completed in 1881.

The Rapp Technical Design Center was completed in 2002. A major project to reroute Pennsylvania Route 18, which runs through the campus, was completed in November 2007. Improvements to Reeves Stadium and the construction of a campus entrance and pedestrian mall were completed in 2009.

=== Presidents ===
- John Black Johnston (1848–1850)
- William Finney George (1850–1852)
- James Renwick Willson Sloane (1852–1856)
- Calvin Knox Milligan (1856–1858)
- John Calvin Smith (1858–1860)
- Nathan Robinson Johnston (1865–1867)
- Samuel John Crowe (1867–1871)
- William Milroy (1871–1872)
- Henry Hosick George (1872–1890)
- William Pollock Johnston (1890–1907)
- William Henry George (1907–1916)
- Renwick Harper Martin (1916–1920)
- Archibald Anderson Johnston (1920–1923)
- McLeod Milligan Pearce (1923–1948)
- Charles Marston Lee (1948–1956)
- Edwin Cameron Clarke (1956–1980)
- Donald William Felker (1980–1983)
- Edwin Cameron Clarke (1983–1984)
- William Joseph McFarland (1984–1992)
- John H. White (1992–2004)
- Kenneth A. Smith (2004–2015)
- Calvin L. Troup (2016–Present)

== Administration ==
Two bodies oversee the administration of the college, the Board of Corporators and the Board of Trustees; while the Corporators are the legal owners of the college, in practice most authority is delegated to the Trustees, who are elected by the Corporators. Both Boards drafted the philosophical basis on which the college rests, known as the Foundational Concepts of Higher Education. The RPCNA still takes an active sponsorship and oversight role in the college: the college president, chaplain, and chairman of the Department of Biblical Studies must be members of the RPCNA, and all members of the Board of Corporators and the majority of the Board of Trustees must be RPCNA members. All professors and lecturers in the Department of Biblical Studies must subscribe to the Westminster Confession of Faith, and all full-time faculty and staff members must submit a written statement confessing faith in Jesus Christ and the Christian religion.

The university was granted an exception to Title IX in 2014 which allows it to legally discriminate against LGBT students.

== Academics ==
Geneva offers undergraduate degree programs in the arts and sciences, such as elementary education, business, engineering, student ministry, biology, and psychology. In 2006, the Educational Testing Service (ETS) rated the Business and Accounting undergraduates in the 95th percentile amongst American colleges.

Historically, Geneva offered a Degree Completion Program (DCP) for degrees in Human Resource Management, Community Ministry or Organizational Development for adult students mainly at off-campus locations. Geneva also established the Center for Urban Theological Studies in Philadelphia and has sister colleges in Taiwan (Christ College) and South Korea (Chong Shin College and Theological Seminary).

Geneva also offers graduates studies in several fields and degrees including a Master of Business Administration, Master of Arts in Higher Education, Master of Arts in Counseling, and a Master of Science in Cybersecurity.

Geneva established the Center for Technology Development in 1986 for providing research, prototyping and technical support to local industries and entrepreneurs. The center was awarded first prize in the Consolidated Natural Gas Company's Annual Award of Excellence competition in 1990.

=== Online courses ===
Geneva offers online degree programs for adult students. Currently, Geneva offers online Bachelor of Professional Studies degrees in Child and Family Services, Human Resources, Management, and Organization Leadership. The College also offers an online Associate's Degree in general studies.

Geneva partners with Portage Learning to offer online college courses on their platform. These online college courses are offered to visiting students seeking to transfer courses to their home institution where they intend to pursue a degree. Courses completed prior to matriculation may be used by Geneva students to fulfill degree requirements.

=== Affiliations and accreditations ===
Geneva College is a member institution of the Council for Christian Colleges and Universities, Council of Independent Colleges, and National Association of Independent Colleges and Universities. Accreditations include the Commission on Higher Education of the Middle States Association of Colleges and Schools, Accreditation Board for Engineering and Technology, Association of Collegiate Business Schools and Programs, and the Council for Accreditation of Counseling and Related Educational Programs. The chemistry degree is certified by the American Chemical Society.

== Athletics ==
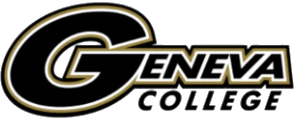
Geneva athletics logo

Geneva's sports teams are called the Golden Tornadoes. The college is a dual member of the National Collegiate Athletic Association (NCAA) Division III and National Christian College Athletic Association (NCCAA) Division I.

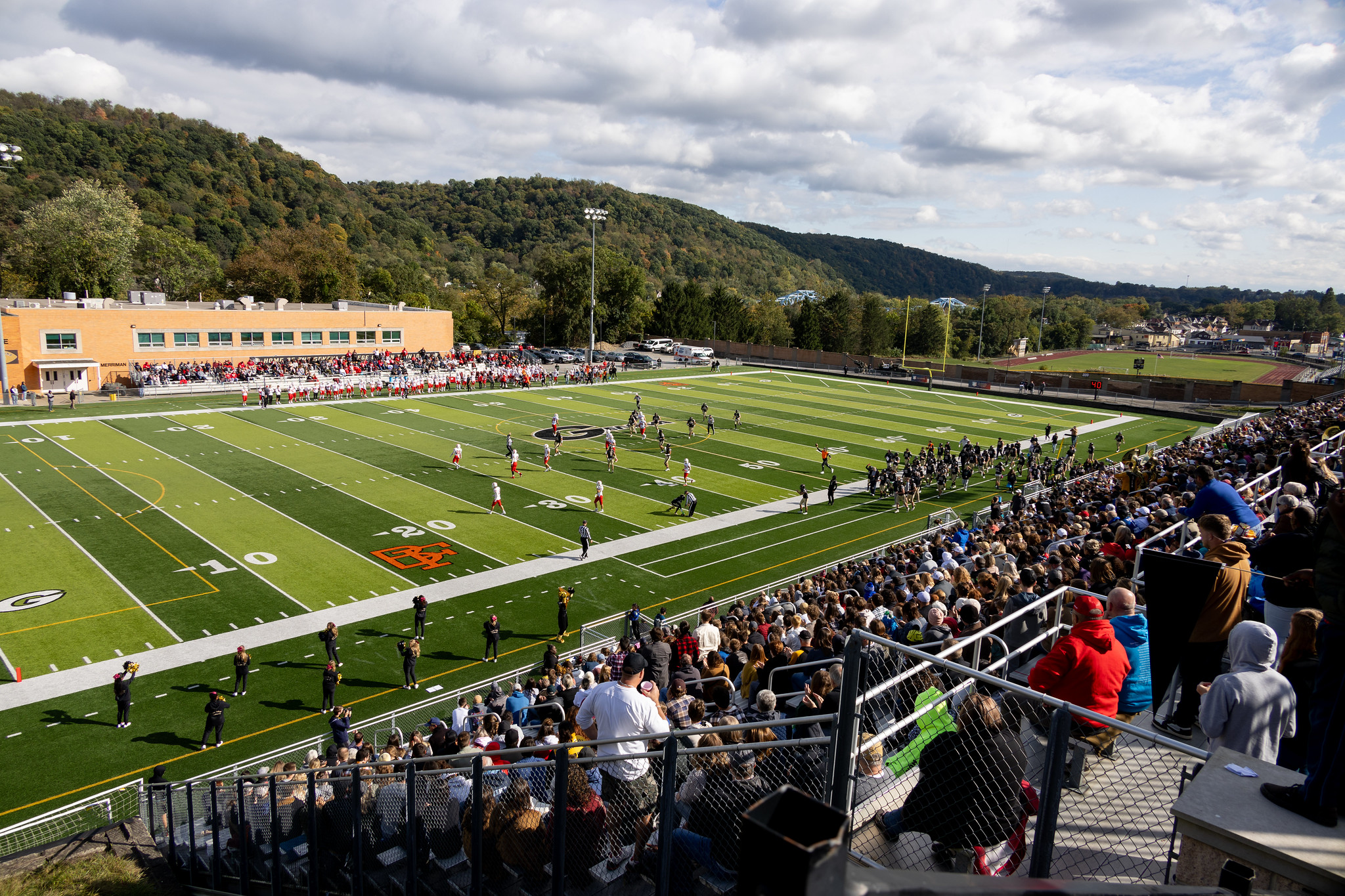
Reeves Field, football venue

The Golden Tornadoes compete as a member of the Presidents' Athletic Conference. Geneva was a member of the National Association of Intercollegiate Athletics (NAIA) for many years and competed in the now-defunct American Mideast Conference. Geneva joined the NCAA as a provisional member in 2007 and during the transition process was not eligible for post season play or conference Player of the Week honors until gaining membership in July 2011.

The school offers a range of men's and women's varsity sports, including football, baseball, softball, basketball, volleyball, track and field, cross country, tennis, and soccer. Geneva has also offered rugby as a club sport since 1994.

The football program began in 1890 under head coach William McCracken. Over the years, the football team has amassed an all-time record of 496 wins, 437 losses, and 48 ties with five appearances in the Victory Bowl. The current football coach is Geno DeMarco.

== Culture and traditions ==
Students must attend a designated number of weekly college-sponsored chapels to qualify for graduation. Alcohol is banned from the campus, and tobacco use is restricted from the entire campus. Greek letter fraternities and sororities are not permitted.

One of the earliest college basketball games in the United States occurred at Geneva College on April 8, 1893, when the Geneva College Covenanters defeated the New Brighton YMCA. Geneva commemorates this event through the athletic slogan of "The Birthplace of College Basketball". Geneva also has one of the oldest basketball courts in collegiate sports in the Johnston Gymnasium.

Geneva was founded by Scottish and Scots-Irish immigrants. Many names of campus buildings and areas bear Scottish names:

- The main meeting area of the Student Center is called Skye Lounge after the Isle of Skye.
- The library on campus is named McCartney Library after Dr. Clarence E. Macartney, the son of Scottish immigrant parents.
- The restaurant-style eating area is called The Brig, short for Brigadoon, commemorating a play about a mythical Highland village.

Geneva sports teams were nicknamed the Covenanters until the 1950s. Members of the RPCNA are sometimes referred to as Covenanters because the denomination traces its roots to the Covenanting tradition of Reformation era Scotland. The modern sports nickname of Golden Tornadoes commemorates the "Golden Tornado" of May 11, 1914, when a major tornado struck the college, most notably taking the gold colored roof from the top of Old Main, which was the origin of the associated color. Although the storm caused significant damage to the campus, there were no serious injuries. College students and faculty rejoiced at what they believed was a sign of God's mercy.

Geneva's traditional sports rivalry is with Westminster College in nearby New Wilmington, Pennsylvania.

Homosexual behavior is prohibited in the student handbook; students must confess and change their behavior or be suspended.

== Facilities ==
=== Offices and classrooms ===
- Alexander Hall—Admissions, Financial Aid, Alumni Relations, and the Geneva College Foundation (first floor), and main dining hall (second floor).
- Alumni Hall, the primary music building, including music department offices
- Fern Cliffe, faculty offices for political science, humanities, history and English departments
- Johnston Gym, built in 1911, Johnston Gym is primarily used for music and band purposes. Originally, per its name, it was used as the college gymnasium.
- McCartney Library, the college library, built in 1930 and expanded in 1965, and named for Clarence E. Macartney. Its collection includes over 371,000 items including a special section of RPCNA historical documents.
- Northwood Hall, classrooms and faculty offices for business and psychology departments, completed in 1998
- Old Main, classrooms, administration offices (including the president's office), and faculty offices. When Geneva moved to Beaver Falls, Old Main was the first classroom structure, completed in 1881. It has been assessed as eligible for listing on the National Register of Historic Places.
- Rapp Technical Design Center, technical classrooms and laboratories. Completed in 2002, it is the newest educational building on campus.
- Science and Engineering (S&E), technical classrooms, laboratories, and faculty offices for engineering, chemistry, biology, physics and computer science departments.

=== Sports and student life ===
- Bagpiper Theatre—Theater hosting productions sponsored by the Communications Department.
- Merriman Athletic Complex—Track and field and soccer.
- Metheny Fieldhouse—Gyms, locker rooms, sports faculty offices, and other sports-related facilities.
- Jannuzi Tennis Courts—A pair of dedicated tennis courts.
- Reeves Field—Football. The field is also used by the Beaver Falls High School football team and was Joe Namath's home field during his high school days.
- Student Center—Lounges, Brigadoon restaurant, Riverview Cafe coffee shop, student mail, fitness center and bookstore.
- WGEV—college radio station.

=== Residence halls ===
Full-time undergraduate students between ages 17 and 23 are required to live in college housing, with the exception of commuters and some seniors. Six dormitories — Clarke, Geneva Arms, McKee, Memorial, Pearce, and Young — house resident students. Geneva Arms and Young are apartment-style options divided into women's and men's wings. The college also owns a few smaller houses nearby campus, primarily for upperclassmen, that are available depending on residential need.

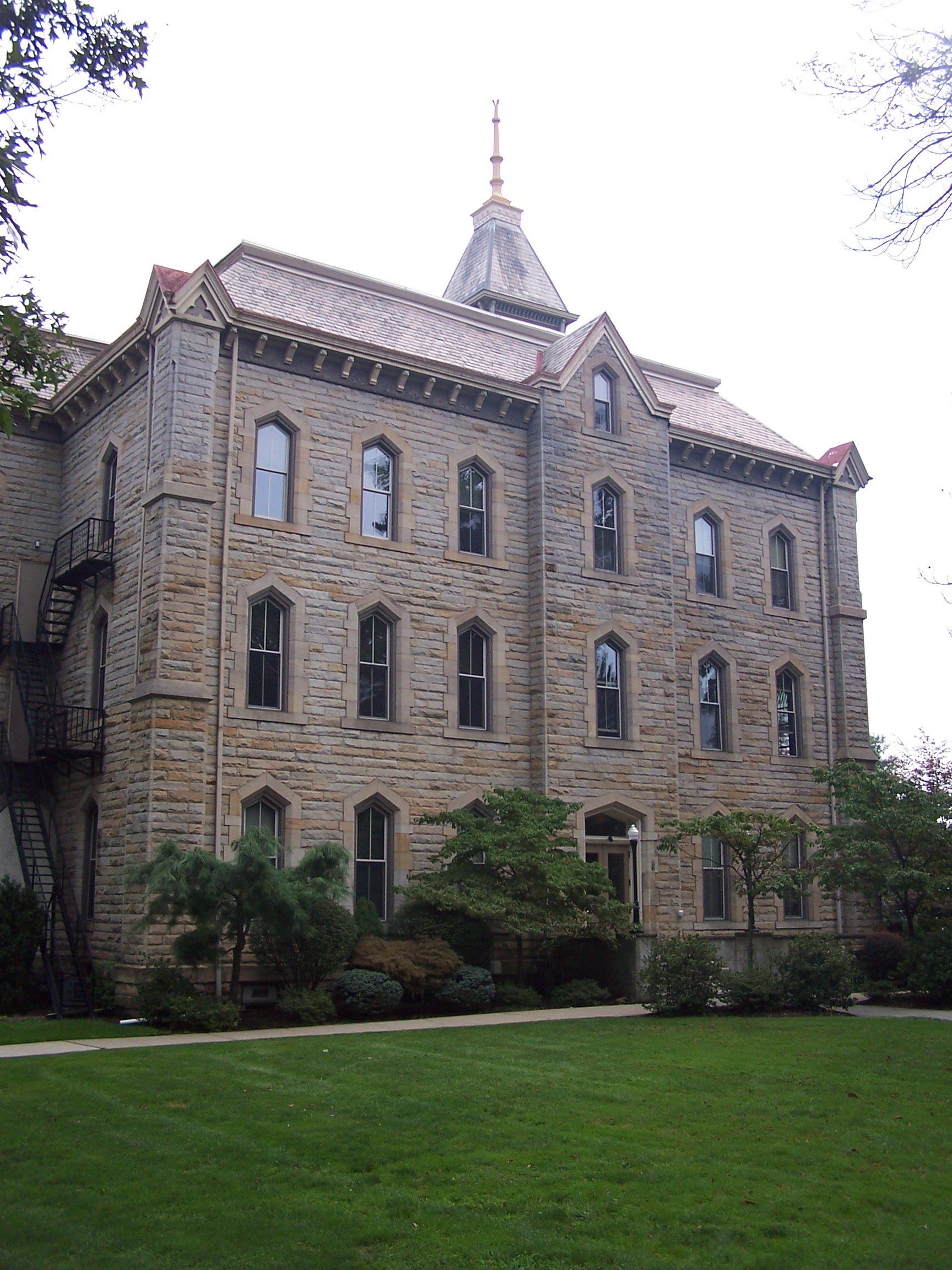
Old Main

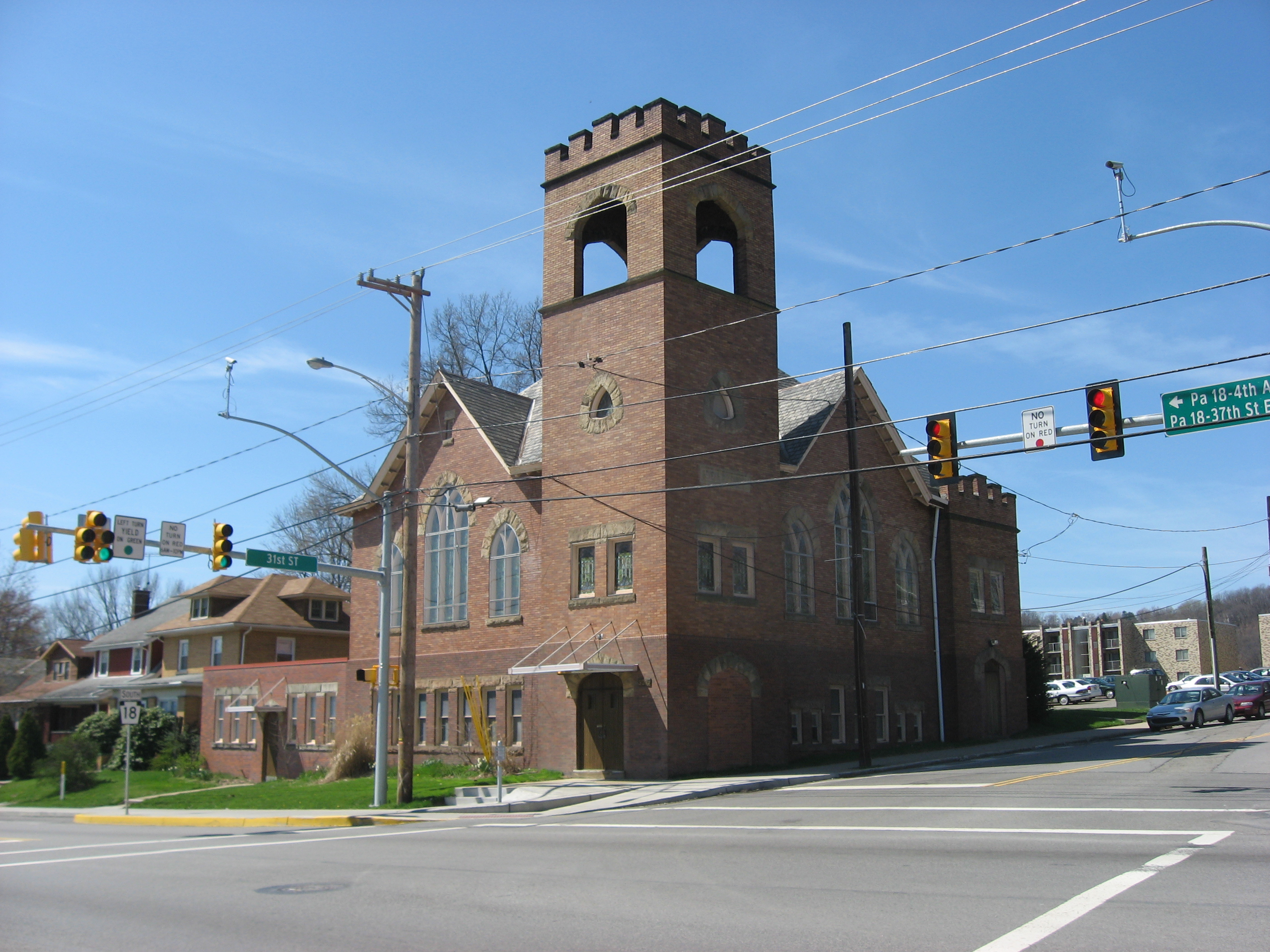
Reformed Presbyterian Church

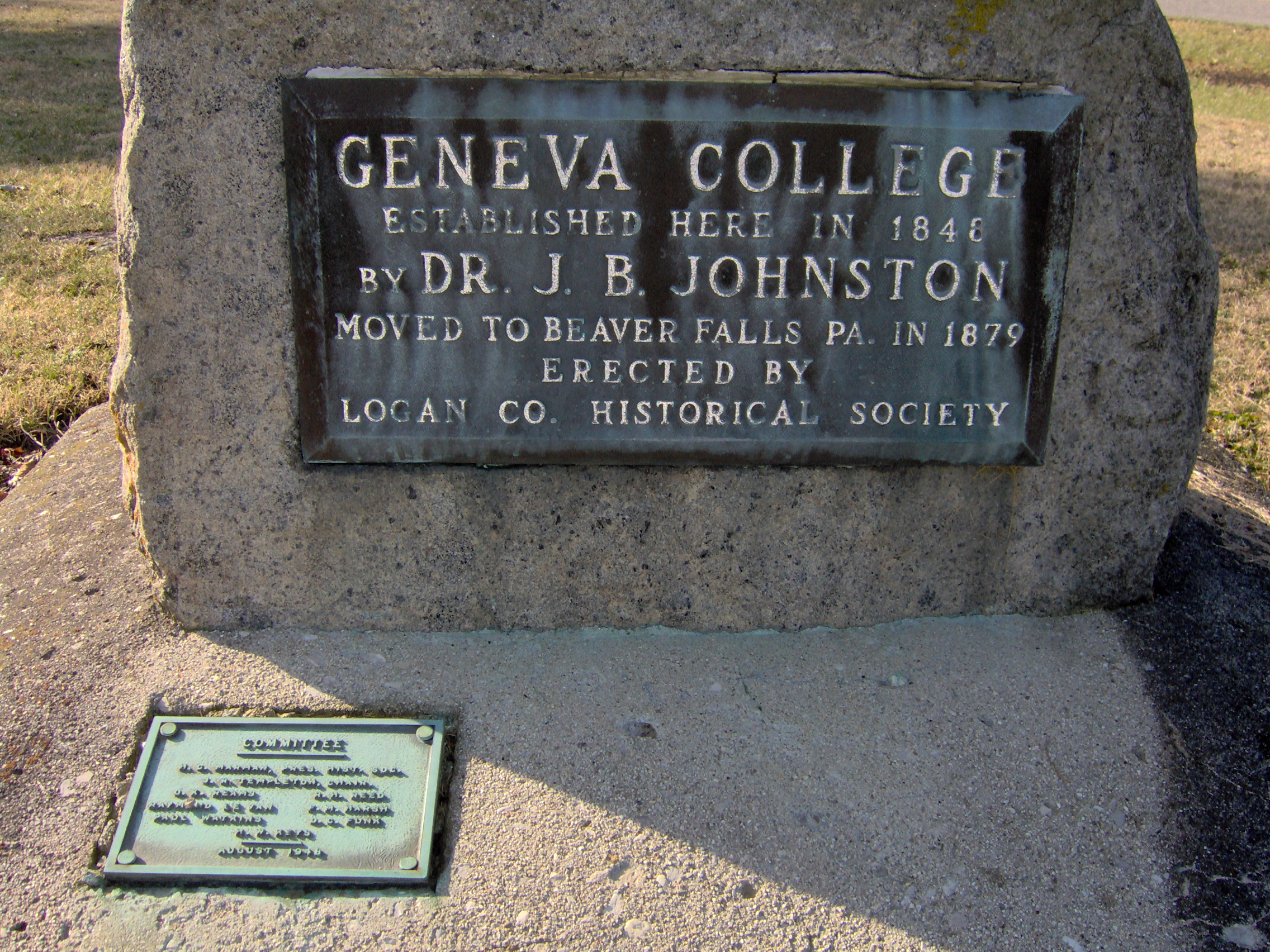
Stone marking the original campus in Northwood, Ohio

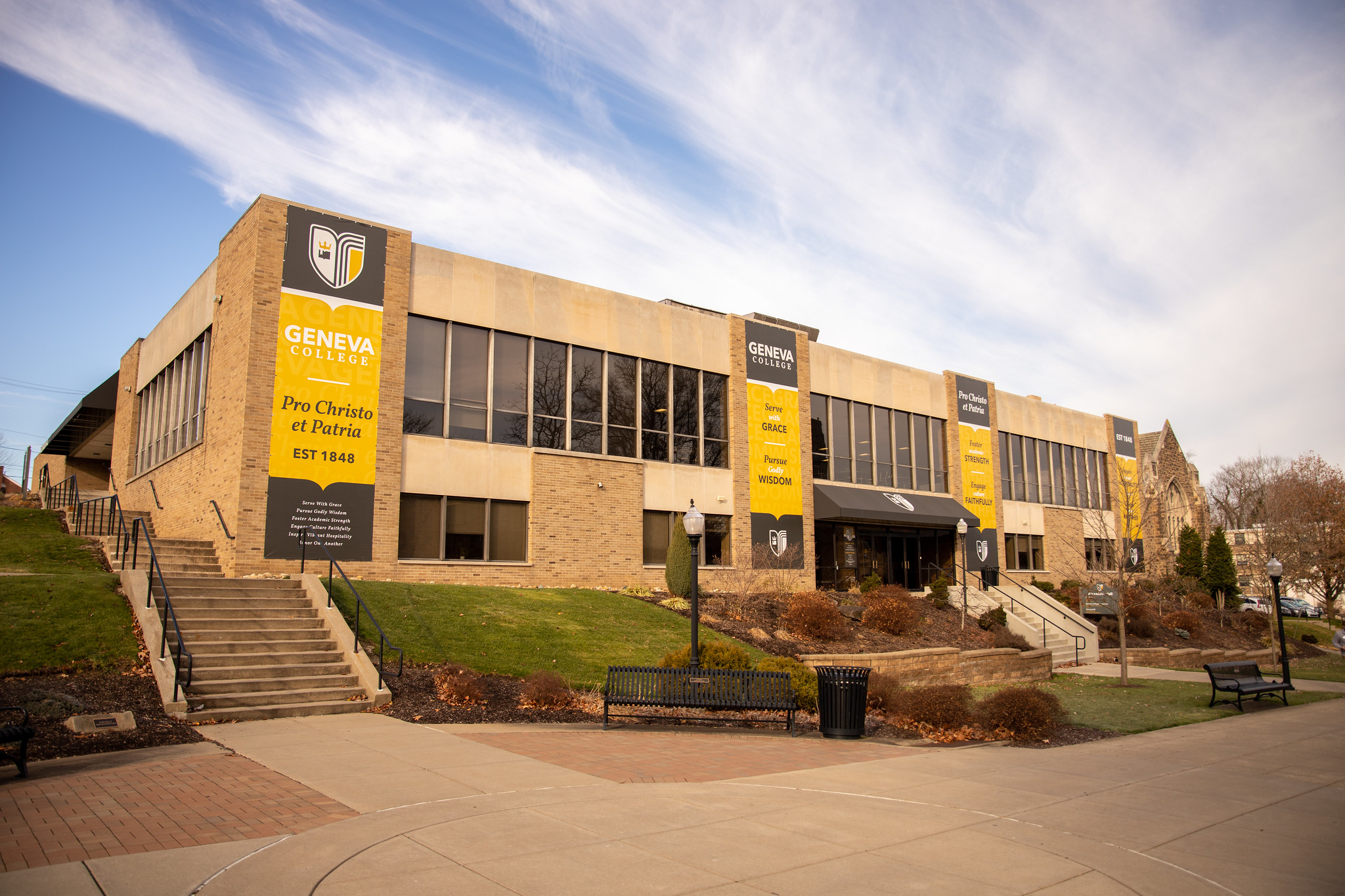
Campus-level view of Alexander Hall

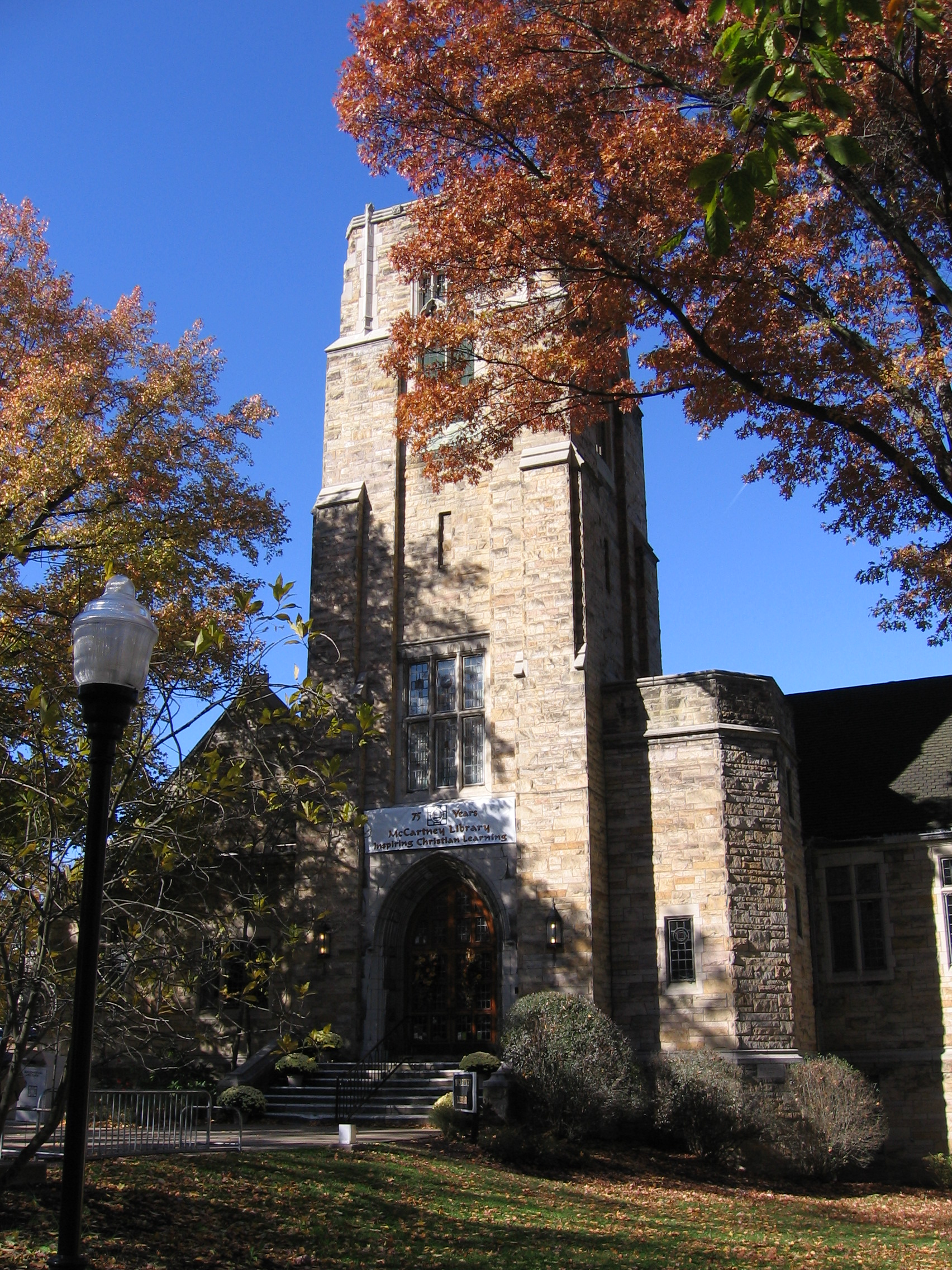
McCartney Library

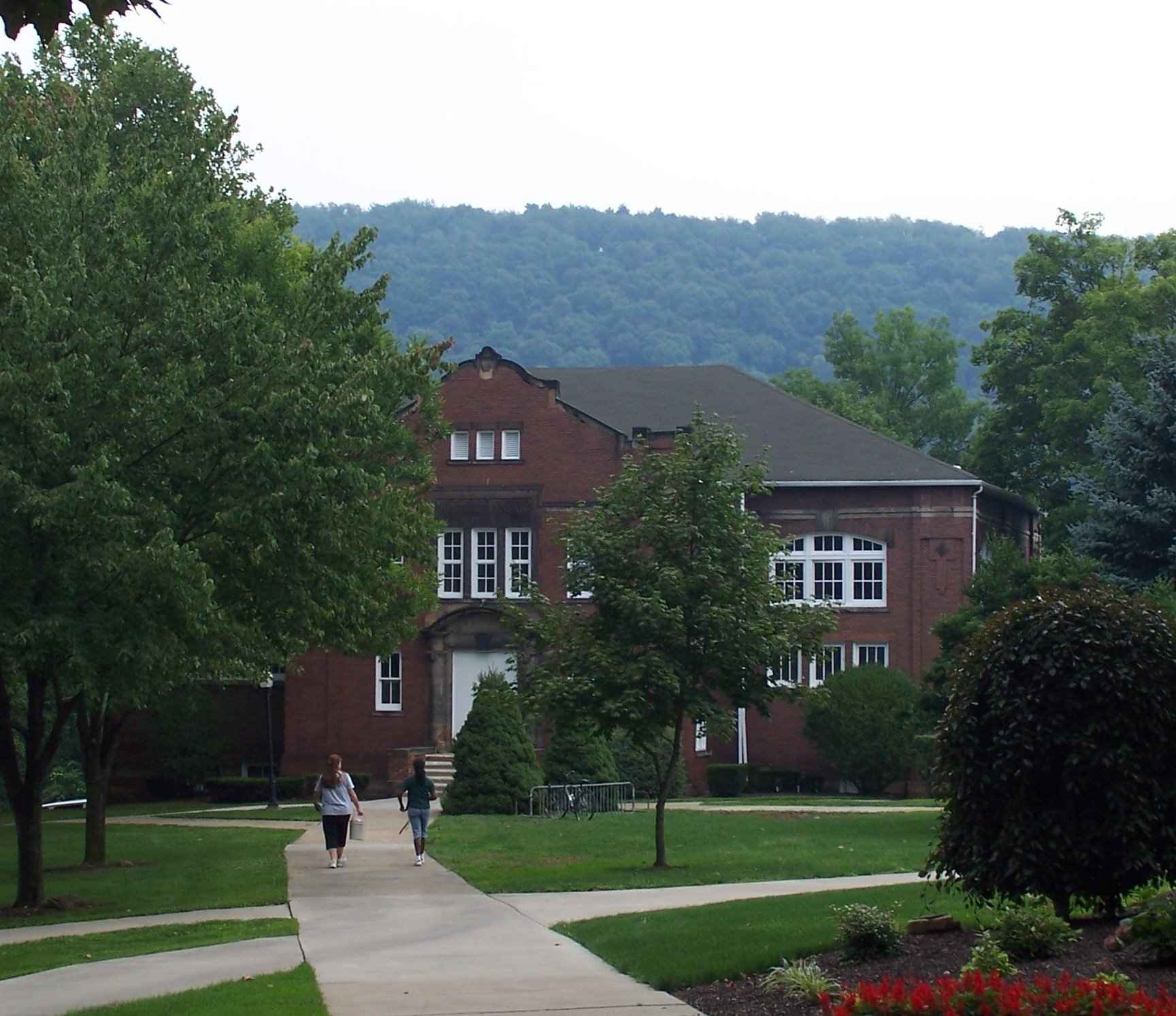
Johnston Gym

== Legal actions ==
=== CareerLink ===
On December 15, 2006, the college filed a federal lawsuit against the Commonwealth of Pennsylvania, alleging that a decision by the state to block the college from participating in the state sponsored CareerLink job service amounted to a violation of the college's First Amendment rights. Although the state argued that the college's requirement that faculty and staff members subscribe to the Christian religion amounted to discrimination, the lawsuit was settled. Geneva's right to access to CareerLink was restored and the college retains a statement on its employment applications stating "Compliance with Geneva's Christian views is considered a bona fide occupational qualification ... and will have a direct impact on employment consideration."

=== Obamacare ===
In 2012, the college sued the federal government over the Patient Protection and Affordable Care Act ("Obamacare") contraceptive mandate, which requires employers to provide health insurance coverage for their employees that includes contraception, which Geneva College "considers abortion, abortifacients and embryo-harming pharmaceuticals" and objects to on religious grounds. The college, represented by Alliance Defending Freedom in the litigation, prevailed in its case, obtaining a permanent injunction in 2018.

== Notable alumni ==
- Josie Badger, Ms Wheelchair America in 2011
- Joyce Bender, CEO, President, and founder of Bender Consulting Services, Inc. International advocate for disability employment
- Norman Clyde, Naturalist and mountaineer
- John Steuart Curry, American painter
- William Fitzsimmons, Singer-songwriter
- Kathryn Gardner, Judge of the Kansas Court of Appeals
- David Girardi, professional football coach
- Cal Hubbard, professional football and professional baseball umpire
- Josh Kail, Member of the Pennsylvania House of Representatives from the 15th district
- Gertrude Martin Rohrer, composer
- David Shedd, Former Director of Defense Intelligence Agency
- John Snarey, Franklin N. Parker Professor Emeritus at Emory University
- Caleb Stegall, Kansas Supreme Court judge
- Dan K. Williams, Member of the Pennsylvania House of Representatives from the 74th district
