= Joseph Pierron =

American judge

G. Joseph Pierron (born May 16, 1947) is a former American judge of the Kansas Court of Appeals, serving from 1990 to 2020.

== Background ==
George Joseph "Joe" Pierron Jr. was born to George Joseph Pierron Sr. and Rosemary Pierron on May 16, 1947, in Kansas City, Kansas. He graduated from Olathe Senior High School in 1964, Rockhurst College of Kansas City, Missouri, in 1968 and the University of Kansas School of Law in 1971. Judge Pierron married Amy Dennis in 1976; she died in 2000. They had three children. Pierron is married to Diana Carlin Pierron, a retired university professor and administrator; they reside in Lawrence, KS.

== Career history ==
Prior to his appointment to the Court of Appeals in 1990, he served as a district judge in Olathe from 1982. In the years prior he served as an assistant county and district attorney in Johnson County, Kansas, from 1971. He also served as municipal judge of Spring Hill in 1972. He retired from the Court of Appeals on April 3, 2020.

== Charitable service and honors ==
Judge Pierron has served as president of the Kansas Committee for the Prevention of Child Abuse and on the board of directors of the Kansas Children's Service League. He serves on the Kansas Bar Association Law Related Education committee and is a member of the American Bar Association Judicial Administration and Alternative Dispute Resolution sections. He served as chair of the Bicentennial Commission on the United States Constitution for Johnson County. He served as chair of Kids Voting Kansas, founded by former Governor Bill Graves and Secretary of State Ron Thornburgh. Kids Voting is a state chapter of Kids Voting USA, an organization to encourage voting through education in the schools and parallel mock elections held in official polling places during regular elections.

Judge Pierron has received leadership and public service awards from the National Committee for the Prevention of Child Abuse, the Kansas Children and Youth Advocacy committee, the Kansas Corporation for Change, the Olathe Police Department, the Olathe Medical Center, and the Olathe Jaycees and the Leavenworth, Kansas Bar Association. He received the Junior League of Topeka Community Volunteer Award in 1998, the Kansas Bar Association Outstanding Service Award in 1999 and the Liberty Bell Award from the Shawnee County Bar Association in 2002 and 2014, and the State Department of Education Civic Education Partnership Award in 2008. In 2009, Judge Pierron received the first Kansas Boys' State Governor's Award for outstanding leadership, public service and dedication to the youth of Kansas. In 2010, he was named to the Olathe High School Wall of Fame. In 2011, he was awarded the first Kansas District Judges Association community outreach and education award. In 2011, he received the American Bar Association Burnham (Hod) Greely Award, "in recognition of his outstanding contribution to promoting public awareness of the importance of a fair, impartial and independent judiciary." In 2015 he received a community service award from the Women Attorneys Association of Topeka. He joined Rotary International in 1971, served as president of the Olathe Rotary Club, and is a member of the Downtown Topeka Rotary club and a Paul Harris Fellow.
