= G. Gordon Atcheson =

American judge (born 1954)

Judge of the Kansas Court of Appeals
- Incumbent
- Assumed office September 10, 2010
- Appointed by: Mark Parkinson
- Preceded by: Jerry Elliott

Personal details
- Born: May 17, 1954 (age 71) Cortland, New York, U.S.
- Party: Democratic
- Children: 2
- Education: University of Michigan (BA); University of Kansas School of Law (JD)

G. Gordon Atcheson (born May 17, 1954) is a Judge of the Kansas Court of Appeals.

== Education and legal career ==
Atcheson received his Bachelor of Arts in political science from the University of Michigan in 1976 and his Juris Doctor from the University of Kansas School of Law in 1981. After graduation from law school he began his legal career in the Sedgwick County District Attorney's office in 1981. He joined the law firm of Hall, Turner & Pike in Wichita after leaving the district attorney's office in 1983. He remained with that firm until 1987 when he joined the firm of Shamberg, Johnson & Bergman. In 1989, he left Shamberg, Johnson & Bergman, and began a private practice with the firm of Blake & Uhlig, where he remained until February 2005, when he founded the firm of The Atcheson Law Office, Westwood, KS, where he was the sole practitioner and practiced until his appointment to the court.

== Appointment to Kansas Court of Appeals ==
He was one of 18 judges and attorneys who were under consideration for a seat on the court. He was appointed to the court by Governor Mark Parkinson on July 14, 2010, to fill the vacancy created by the death of Jerry Elliott. He took his seat on September 10, 2010 after closing his law practice. Atcheson was retained by voters on November 6, 2012, and again on November 8, 2016.

== Personal ==
Atcheson was born and raised in Cortland, New York. Atcheson has been married to Cheryl A. Pilate, a principal at a Kansas City, MO law firm, since 1979. They have two children, a son Eric, and a daughter, Katherine. He is a member of the Democratic Party.

== See also ==
- 2020 Kansas elections

Legal offices
Preceded by Jerry Elliott	Judge of the Kansas Court of Appeals; 2010–present	Incumbent
