= Lesley A. Isherwood =

American judge

Judge of the Kansas Court of Appeals
- Incumbent
- Assumed office April 30, 2021
- Appointed by: Laura Kelly
- Preceded by: Steve Leben

Personal details
- Born: December 2, 1972 (age 53)
- Education: Washburn University (BA, JD)

Lesley A. Isherwood (born December 2, 1972) is a Judge of the Kansas Court of Appeals.

== Education and legal career ==
Isherwood earned her Bachelor of Arts in English, with honors, from Washburn University in 1995, she graduated from the Washburn University School of Law in 1998. After graduating law school, she briefly practiced with Williams, Stroble, Malone, Mason & Ralph, P.A., in Dodge City, Kansas. From 1999 to 2021 she was a prosecutor for Sedgwick County and concurrently served as the senior assistant district attorney in the appellate division.

== Kansas Court of Appeals ==
Isherwood was one of three candidates recommended to the governor, along with Carl A. Folsom, III and Russell J. Keller. On February 18, 2021, Governor Laura Kelly nominated Isherwood to be a judge of the Kansas Court of Appeals to the seat vacated by the retirement of Judge Steve Leben. On March 23, 2021, she was confirmed by the Kansas Senate by a 40–0 vote. She was sworn in on April 30, 2021.

Legal offices
Preceded by Steve Leben	Judge of the Kansas Court of Appeals; 2021–present	Incumbent
