= Kim R. Schroeder =

American judge

Judge of the Kansas Court of Appeals
- Incumbent
- Assumed office January 12, 2013
- Appointed by: Sam Brownback

Judge of the Kansas District Court for the 26th District
- In office November 1998 – January 12, 2013

Personal details
- Born: July 1957 (age 68) Winfield, Kansas
- Education: Seward County Community College, A.A. Washburn University, B.A. Washburn University School of Law, J.D.

Kim R. Schroeder (born July 1957) is a Judge of the Kansas Court of Appeals.

== Early life and education ==
Schroeder earned an Associate of Arts degree from Seward County Community College in Liberal, Kansas, in 1977 and a Bachelor of Arts from Washburn University in 1979. He received his Juris Doctor from Washburn University School of Law in 1982.

== Legal career and state judicial career ==
He began his legal career in 1982 with the Hugoton law firm of Brollier & Wolf, where he became a partner in 1984. In 1998 he was elected judge of the 26th Judicial District Court. Schroeder remained on the district court bench until his appointment to the Kansas Court of Appeals in 2013.

== Appointment to Kansas Court of Appeals ==
He was appointed to the court by Governor Sam Brownback on January 12, 2013. He was retained by voters in 2014 for a four-year term that ends January 13, 2019.

== Personal ==
Schroeder and his wife, Karolyn, have been married for more than 35 years. They have two adult children, a son who died in 2007, and a daughter who is a registered nurse in Shawnee, where she resides with her family.

Legal offices
Unknown	Judge of the Kansas Court of Appeals; 2013–present	Incumbent
