= McCartney Library =

Library at Geneva College

Coordinates: 40.7735°N 80.3222°W

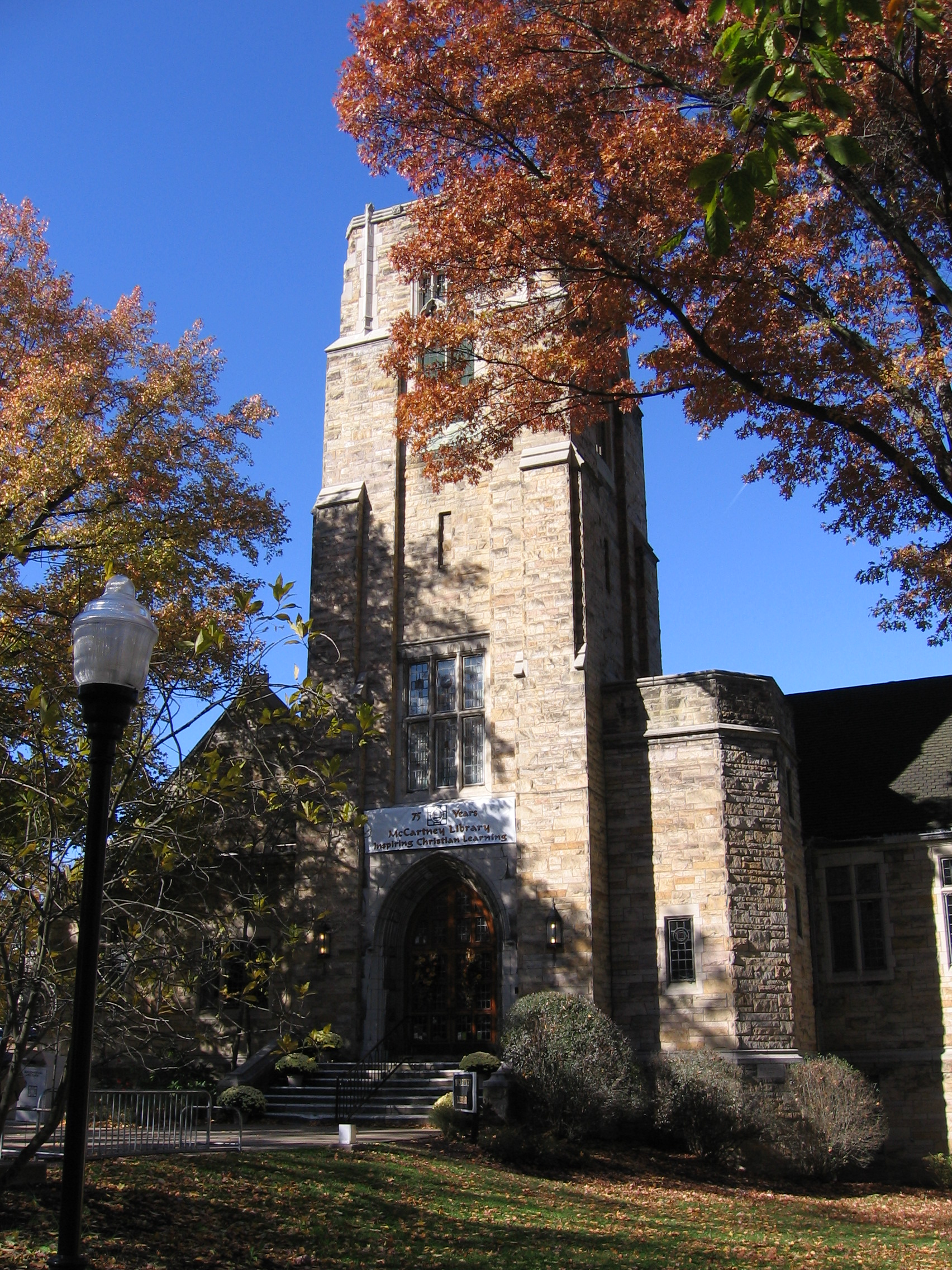
- Location: Beaver Falls, Pennsylvania
- Established: 1930

Collection
- Size: 400,000 items

Access and use
- Population served: Campus and surrounding community

Other information
- Website: http://www.geneva.edu/page/library

McCartney Library is an academic library located on the campus of Geneva College in Beaver Falls, Pennsylvania, United States. The building is named after the evangelical minister Clarence E. Macartney who grew up in Fern Cliffe House when the college moved to Beaver Falls in 1880.

Today, the library consists of more than 400,000 items available to students and professors as well as surrounding community members. There is an online database for the library, and also an online catalog called "MacCat". The library includes a media center located on the ground floor and also houses collections of books about the college and the history of the Reformed Presbyterian Church of North America, along with the Covenanter Collection, the Geneva Author Collection, and Macartney's private collection.

== History ==
In the 1930s, S.J., E.J., and S.M. Deal (three sisters from Clarence E. Macartney's congregation) donated the funds for the construction of a college library in honor of their pastor. They employed architect and designer, William G. Eckles, who also designed Geneva's Johnston Gymnasium and McKee Hall, to design the library. More on the architecture and history of the constructing of the library can be found in the book, Pro Christo et Patria: A History of Geneva College, by David M. Carson. Some of the most notable features of the library are the beautiful and ornate stained glass windows, which were created by Harry Lee Willet, a friend of Macartney and a prominent glass maker who owned one of the largest glass making companies in the United States. The Reading Rooms of the library each house a glass window 15 feet (4.6 m) high. One of the windows depicts John Bunyan's The Pilgrim's Progress, and the other, John Milton's Paradise Lost. The history of the Paradise Lost window and the story that is told by it is given in the book Paradise Lost Windows: A Story in Lead and Light by Shirley J. Kilpatrick and M. Howard Mattsson-Bozé, two Geneva professors.

The library has also hosted community and regional conferences for several non-profit and for-profit organizations.

== Willet Windows ==
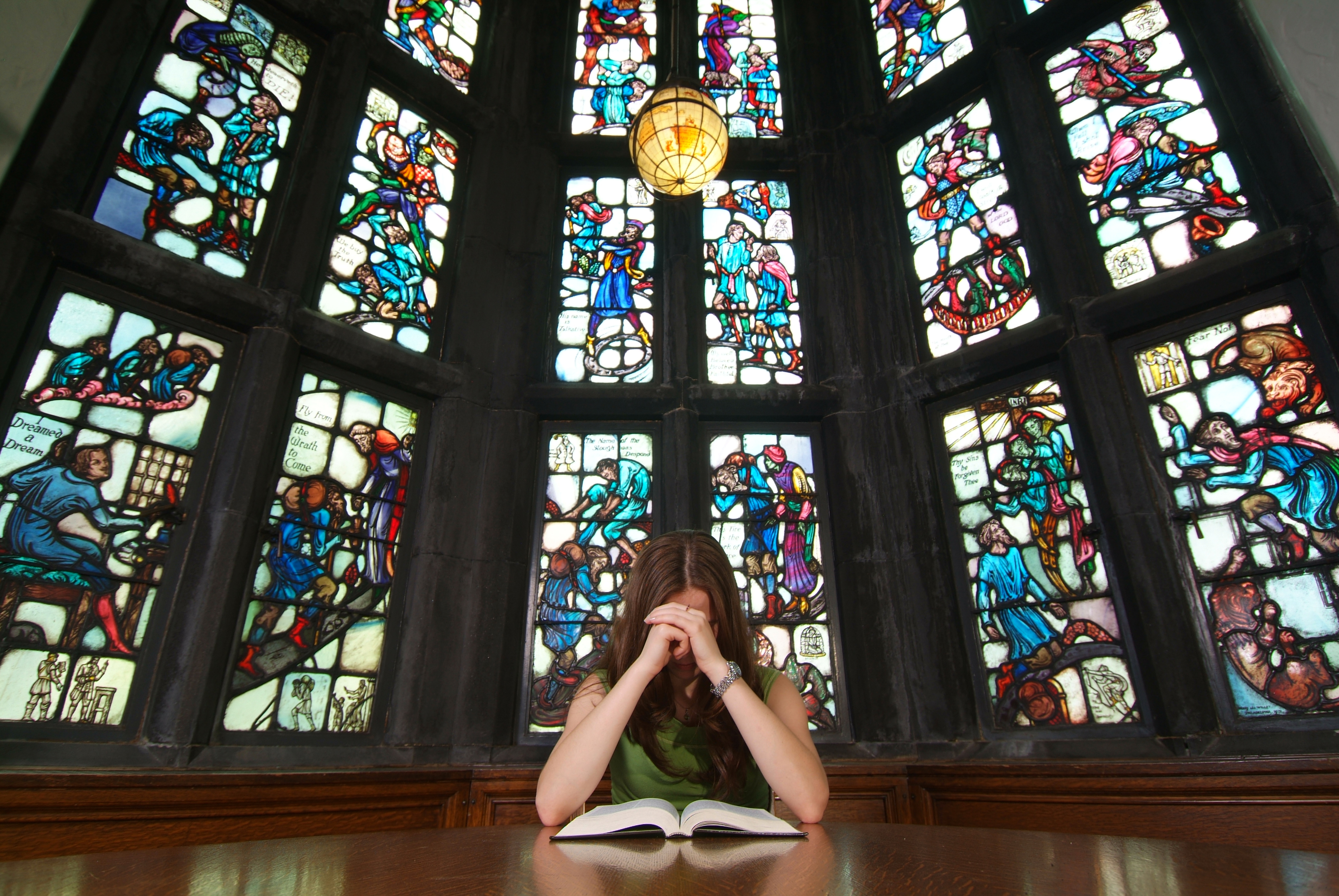
Willet Windows in the library's East Reading Room

One notable feature of the Library is its stained glass windows. Henry Lee Willet of Willet Stained Glass Studios, was commissioned by the Deal sisters to design and produce both of the eighteen-paneled windows in each reading room of the McCartney Library. Willet, who was a close friend of Clarence E. Macartney, was thrilled to take the project. Willet was one of the foremost stained glass makers of his time. Among his other commissions are windows at the Chapel at the United Nations, the Washington National Cathedral, and the Chapel of the U.S. Military Academy at West Point. Willet Stained Glass Studios still exists, having merged in 2005 with the Hauser Art Glass Company to become the Willet Hauser Architectural Glass. It is the largest stained glass company in North America, and has creations in over 14 countries. The Library's Reading Rooms house the two windows, each standing fifteen feet tall. One of the windows provides an artistic depiction of John Bunyan's The Pilgrim's Progress, and the other is a depiction of John Milton's Paradise Lost.

== Deal Carillon ==
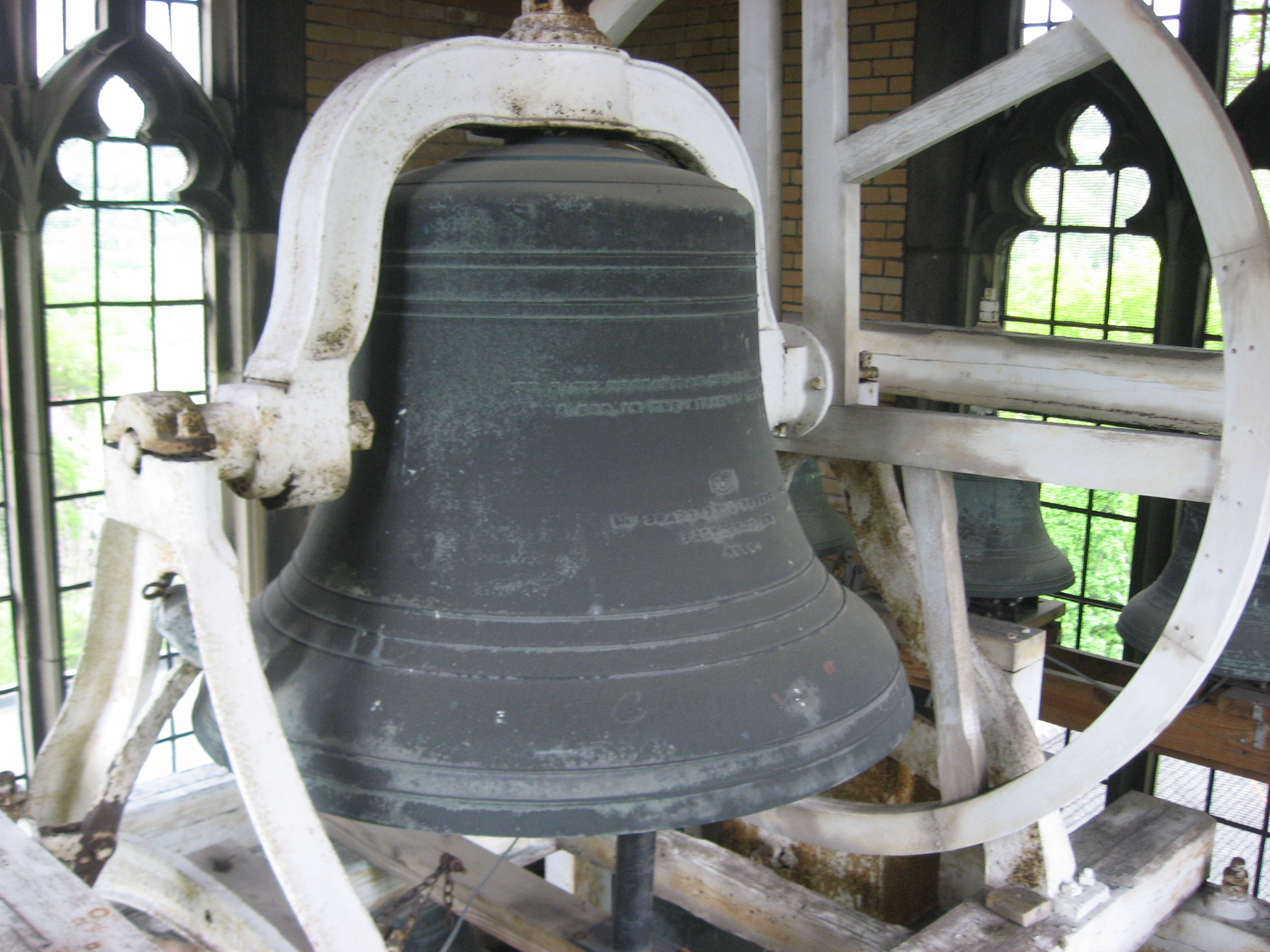
Main bell with others in the background

Another feature of the library building is the Deal Carillon located in the building's bell tower. The Deal Carillon is an array of 14 bells, ranging in weight from 350 to 3,000 pounds. The bells were cast by the McShane Bell Foundry, one of the oldest foundries in the United States. They are also inscribed with psalms and excerpts from Alfred, Lord Tennyson's In Memoriam. The Deal Carillon has the special McShane Chime Ringer system, which enables the Carillon to be played as a musical instrument by using a special keyboard.
