= Tom Malone (judge) =

American judge

Tom Malone is a judge of the Kansas Court of Appeals. He has judged on this court since 2003.

== Biography ==
Judge Malone was born on December 29, 1953, in Wichita, Kansas. He graduated from Newman University in 1976 and from Washburn Law School in 1979. He is now married and has three children.

== Legal career ==
Judge Malone practiced law with the firm Redmond & Nazar, L.L.P. for 12 years with a focus on business and commercial litigation. He also taught business law at Kansas Newman College during this time. In 1990, he was elected to the Sedgwick County District Court, where he judged for 12 years.
