= Fort Scott, Kansas =

- City and County seat
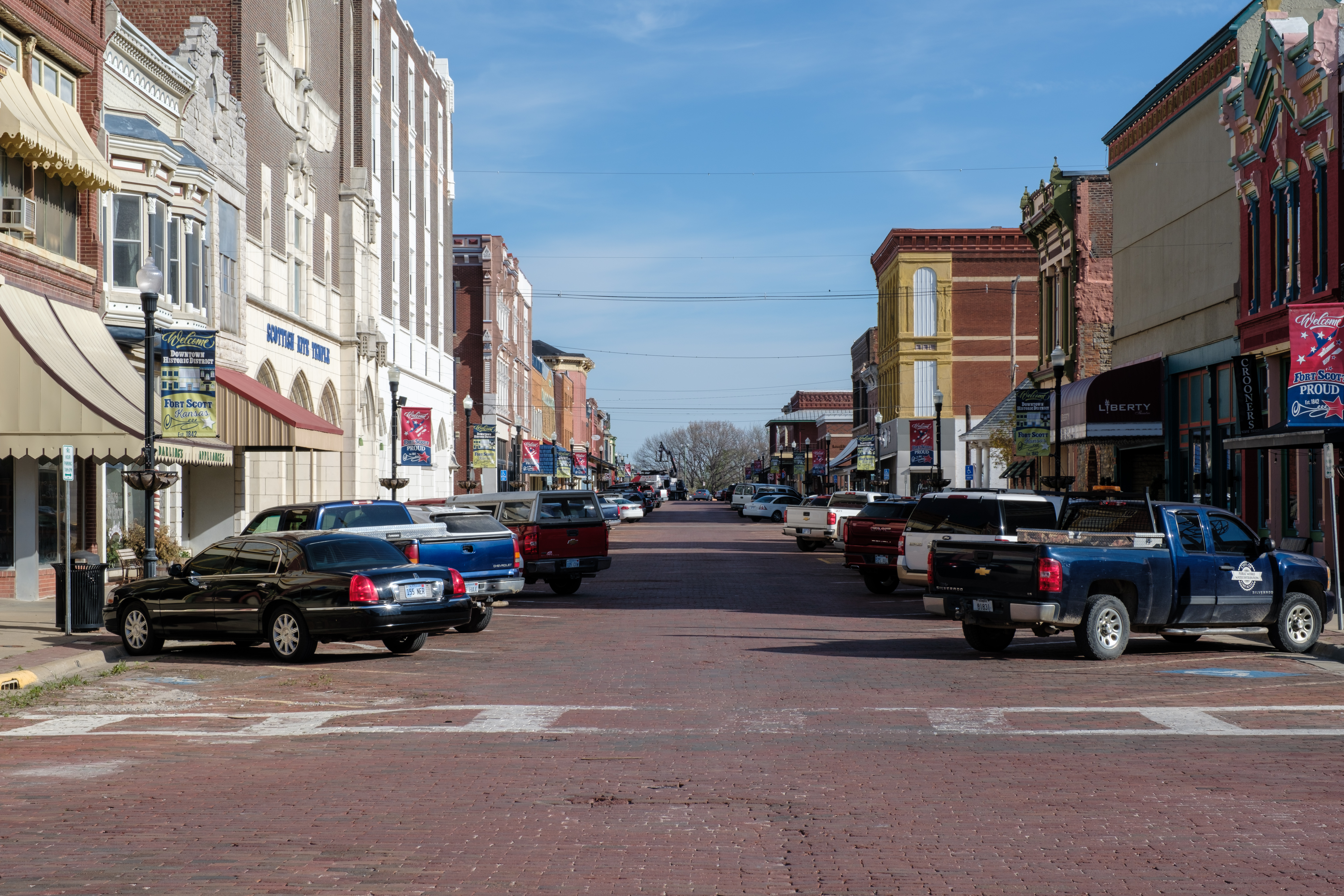
- Downtown Fort Scott (2024)

- Location within Bourbon County and Kansas

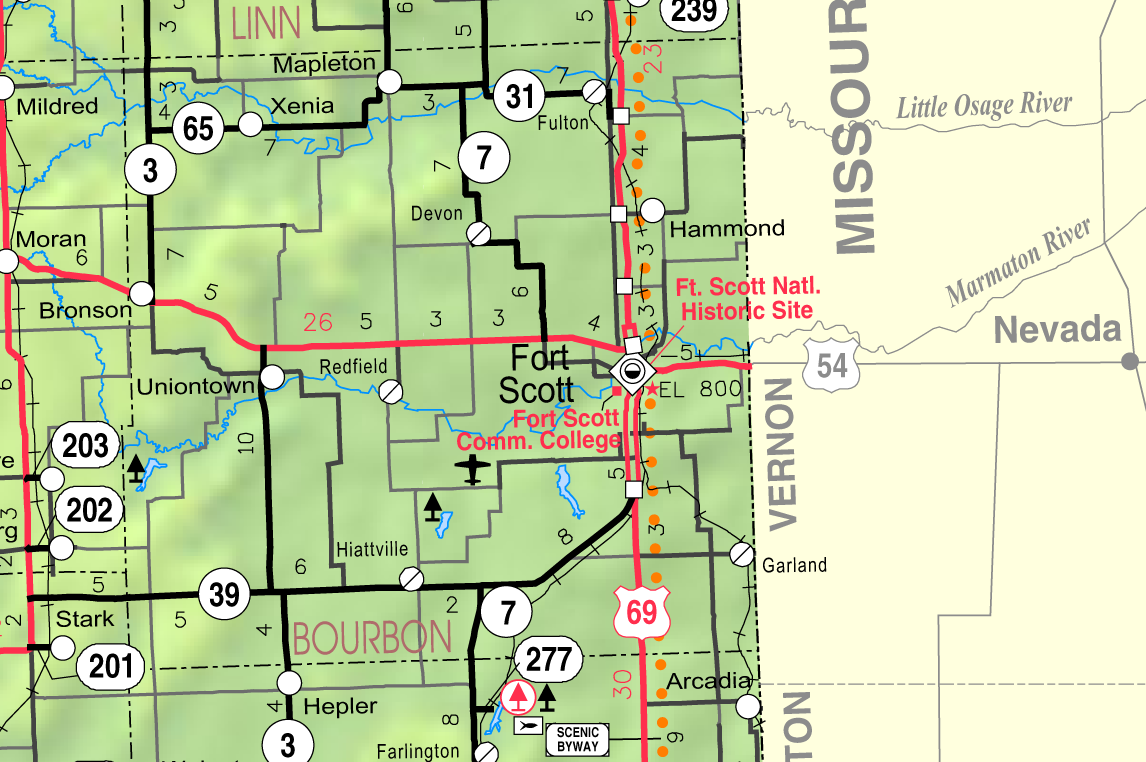
- KDOT map of Bourbon County (legend)
- Coordinates: 37°49′42″N 94°42′14″W
- Country: United States
- State: Kansas
- County: Bourbon
- Founded: 1850s
- Platted: 1857
- Incorporated: 1860
- Named for: Gen. Winfield Scott

Area
  - Total: 5.63 sq mi (14.58 km^{2})
  - Land: 5.59 sq mi (14.47 km^{2})
  - Water: 0.042 sq mi (0.11 km^{2})
- Elevation: 843 ft (257 m)

Population (2020)
  - Total: 7,552
  - Density: 1,352/sq mi (521.9/km^{2})
- Time zone: UTC-6 (CST)
  - Summer (DST): UTC-5 (CDT)
- ZIP Code: 66701
- Area code: 620
- FIPS code: 20-24000
- GNIS ID: 485575
- Website: fscity.org

Fort Scott is a city in and the county seat of Bourbon County, Kansas, United States. As of the 2020 census, the population of the city was 7,552. It is named for Gen. Winfield Scott. The city is located 88 miles (142 km) south of Kansas City on the Marmaton River. It is the home of the Fort Scott National Historic Site and the Fort Scott National Cemetery.

== History ==
Established and garrisoned by the U.S. Army from 1842 to 1853, soldiers at military Fort Scott assisted with the protection of the Permanent Indian Frontier. After the army abandoned the fort in 1853, the buildings were purchased by local settlers at a government auction in 1855. The community of Fort Scott was laid out in 1857, and was chartered as a city in 1860.

Between 1855 and 1861, the citizens of Fort Scott experienced the violent unrest that preceded the American Civil War on the Kansas and Missouri border. Eastern newspapers described this violence as "Bleeding Kansas", a result of the national controversy concerning the extension of slavery into the new territories. On January 29, 1861, Kansas entered the union as a free state, but the turmoil of "Bleeding Kansas" continued throughout the Civil War.

During the Civil War, Fort Scott was a U.S. Army district Headquarters, quartermaster supply depot, training center, and recruitment station. It was strategically vital to the defense of Kansas and the Midwest. A battle over the fort occurred in August 1861 just across the Missouri line in the Battle of Dry Wood Creek. The battle was a pro-South victory for Sterling Price and his Missouri State Guard.

Price did not hold the fort and instead continued a northern push into Missouri in an attempt to recapture the state. Senator James H. Lane was to launch a Jayhawker offensive behind Price from Fort Scott that led to the Sacking of Osceola. The ill will of these actions was to be the basis for the 1976 Clint Eastwood film The Outlaw Josey Wales.

After the Civil War, Fort Scott was a premier city of the frontier, one of the largest cities in eastern Kansas. On three occasions, between 1870 and 1900, Fort Scott was in competition with Kansas City to become the largest railroad center west of the Mississippi.

During the first half of the 20th century, Fort Scott became an agricultural and small industrial center which it continues to be today.

=== Downtown fire ===
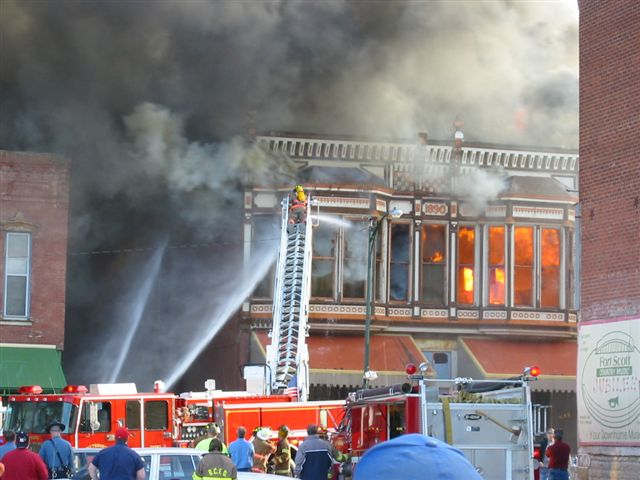
Downtown Fort Scott Fire (2005)

On March 11, 2005, a fire destroyed several historic buildings in Fort Scott's downtown. The Victorian-era buildings were among many that are a symbol of the town.

== Geography ==
Fort Scott lies on the Osage Plains on the south side of the Marmaton River. Located at the intersection of U.S. Routes 54 and 69 in southeastern Kansas, Fort Scott is approximately 54 miles (87 km) north of Joplin, Missouri, 92 miles (148 km) south of Kansas City and 143 miles (230 km) east of Wichita.

According to the United States Census Bureau, the city has a total area of 5.59 square miles (14.48 km^{2}), of which 5.55 square miles (14.37 km^{2}) is land and 0.04 square miles (0.10 km^{2}) is water.

=== Climate ===
Fort Scott has a humid subtropical climate (Köppen Cfa) with hot, humid summers and cool winters. The average temperature in Fort Scott is 57 °F or 13.9 °C with temperatures exceeding 90 °F or 32.2 °C on an average of 52.6 afternoons a year and dropping below 32 °F or 0 °C during an average of 100.6 mornings per year. On average, Fort Scott experiences 83.3 days of precipitation a year. Annual snowfall averages 8.4 inches or 0.21 metres. Precipitation averages 44.49 inches or 1,130 millimetres per year. On average, January is the coolest month, July the hottest and June the wettest. The hottest temperature recorded in Fort Scott was 120 °F (48.9 °C); recorded twice on July 13 and 14, 1954. The coldest temperature recorded was −24 °F (−31.1 °C) on February 13, 1905.

Climate data for Fort Scott, Kansas (1991–2020 normals, extremes 1896–present)
Month	Jan	Feb	Mar	Apr	May	Jun	Jul	Aug	Sep	Oct	Nov	Dec	Year
Record high °F (°C)	77 (25)	84 (29)	95 (35)	97 (36)	101 (38)	107 (42)	120 (49)	113 (45)	110 (43)	99 (37)	85 (29)	75 (24)	120 (49)
Mean maximum °F (°C)	65.3 (18.5)	70.9 (21.6)	79.9 (26.6)	84.0 (28.9)	89.3 (31.8)	94.8 (34.9)	99.0 (37.2)	99.9 (37.7)	94.9 (34.9)	86.3 (30.2)	75.1 (23.9)	66.7 (19.3)	101.0 (38.3)
Mean daily maximum °F (°C)	42.0 (5.6)	47.6 (8.7)	57.8 (14.3)	67.7 (19.8)	76.5 (24.7)	85.9 (29.9)	90.7 (32.6)	89.8 (32.1)	81.6 (27.6)	69.9 (21.1)	56.6 (13.7)	45.7 (7.6)	67.7 (19.8)
Daily mean °F (°C)	32.0 (0.0)	37.0 (2.8)	46.5 (8.1)	56.5 (13.6)	66.3 (19.1)	75.6 (24.2)	80.3 (26.8)	78.9 (26.1)	70.3 (21.3)	58.3 (14.6)	46.1 (7.8)	36.1 (2.3)	57.0 (13.9)
Mean daily minimum °F (°C)	21.9 (−5.6)	26.4 (−3.1)	35.3 (1.8)	45.3 (7.4)	56.0 (13.3)	65.4 (18.6)	70.0 (21.1)	68.0 (20.0)	59.0 (15.0)	46.6 (8.1)	35.5 (1.9)	26.5 (−3.1)	46.3 (7.9)
Mean minimum °F (°C)	5.1 (−14.9)	9.4 (−12.6)	17.6 (−8.0)	30.3 (−0.9)	40.2 (4.6)	53.2 (11.8)	58.3 (14.6)	57.1 (13.9)	43.6 (6.4)	29.9 (−1.2)	19.8 (−6.8)	8.7 (−12.9)	0.6 (−17.4)
Record low °F (°C)	−19 (−28)	−24 (−31)	−6 (−21)	16 (−9)	25 (−4)	41 (5)	48 (9)	42 (6)	29 (−2)	17 (−8)	0 (−18)	−18 (−28)	−24 (−31)
Average precipitation inches (mm)	1.44 (37)	1.75 (44)	2.92 (74)	4.85 (123)	6.19 (157)	5.74 (146)	4.63 (118)	3.98 (101)	4.46 (113)	3.64 (92)	2.84 (72)	2.05 (52)	44.49 (1,130)
Average snowfall inches (cm)	3.9 (9.9)	1.0 (2.5)	0.7 (1.8)	0.1 (0.25)	0.0 (0.0)	0.0 (0.0)	0.0 (0.0)	0.0 (0.0)	0.0 (0.0)	0.0 (0.0)	0.4 (1.0)	2.3 (5.8)	8.4 (21)
Average precipitation days (≥ 0.01 in)	5.9	5.0	6.8	8.6	10.2	9.2	7.2	6.0	6.2	6.8	6.1	5.3	83.3
Average snowy days (≥ 0.1 in)	2.0	0.6	0.5	0.0	0.0	0.0	0.0	0.0	0.0	0.0	0.2	1.0	4.3
Source: NOAA

== Demographics ==
Historical population
Census	Pop.	Note	%±
1860	262		—
1870	4,174		1,493.1%
1880	5,372		28.7%
1890	11,946		122.4%
1900	10,322		−13.6%
1910	10,463		1.4%
1920	10,693		2.2%
1930	10,763		0.7%
1940	10,557		−1.9%
1950	10,335		−2.1%
1960	9,410		−9.0%
1970	8,967		−4.7%
1980	8,893		−0.8%
1990	8,362		−6.0%
2000	8,297		−0.8%
2010	8,087		−2.5%
2020	7,552		−6.6%
2023 (est.)	7,565		0.2%
U.S. Decennial Census

=== 2020 census ===
As of the 2020 census, Fort Scott had a population of 7,552, including 3,080 households and 1,811 families. The median age was 37.0 years. 24.2% of residents were under the age of 18, 11.7% were from 18 to 24, 22.5% were from 25 to 44, 21.9% were from 45 to 64, and 19.7% were 65 years of age or older. For every 100 females, there were 95.2 males, and for every 100 females age 18 and over, there were 90.7 males age 18 and over.

Of the population, 98.2% lived in urban areas and 1.8% lived in rural areas.

There were 3,080 households, of which 29.8% had children under the age of 18 living in them. Of all households, 38.7% were married-couple households, 19.4% were households with a male householder and no spouse or partner present, and 33.5% were households with a female householder and no spouse or partner present. About 35.3% of all households were made up of individuals, and 16.9% had someone living alone who was 65 years of age or older. The average household size was 2.2 and the average family size was 2.8.

There were 3,639 housing units, of which 15.4% were vacant. The homeowner vacancy rate was 3.6% and the rental vacancy rate was 11.7%. The population density was 1,352.0 inhabitants per square mile (522.0/km^{2}), and housing unit density was 651.5 per square mile (251.5/km^{2}).

Racial composition as of the 2020 census
Race	Number	Percent
White	6,373	84.4%
Black or African American	413	5.5%
American Indian and Alaska Native	46	0.6%
Asian	71	0.9%
Native Hawaiian and Other Pacific Islander	2	0.0%
Some other race	94	1.2%
Two or more races	553	7.3%
Hispanic or Latino (of any race)	237	3.1%

The non-Hispanic White population was 83.24%.

=== Demographic estimates ===
The 2016–2020 5-year American Community Survey estimates show that 13.9% of the population age 25 and older held a bachelor's degree or higher.

=== Income and poverty ===
The 2016–2020 5-year American Community Survey estimates show that the median household income was $37,279 (with a margin of error of +/- $6,086) and the median family income was $53,245 (+/- $5,079). Males had a median income of $27,788 (+/- $4,795) versus $20,145 (+/- $4,501) for females. The median income for those above 16 years old was $23,424 (+/- $3,628). Approximately, 12.1% of families and 18.2% of the population were below the poverty line, including 21.1% of those under the age of 18 and 16.7% of those ages 65 or over.

=== 2010 census ===
As of the census of 2010, there were 8,087 people, 3,285 households, and 1,941 families living in the city. The population density was 1,457.1 inhabitants per square mile (562.6/km^{2}). There were 3,819 housing units at an average density of 688.1 per square mile (265.7/km^{2}). The racial makeup of the city was 90.3% White, 4.7% African American, 0.8% Native American, 0.6% Asian, 0.1% Pacific Islander, 0.7% from other races, and 2.9% from two or more races. Hispanic or Latino of any race were 2.5% of the population.

There were 3,285 households, of which 31.5% had children under the age of 18 living with them, 40.8% were married couples living together, 13.6% had a female householder with no husband present, 4.7% had a male householder with no wife present, and 40.9% were non-families. 34.9% of all households were made up of individuals, and 17.1% had someone living alone who was 65 years of age or older. The average household size was 2.34 and the average family size was 3.02.

The median age in the city was 35.2 years. 25.5% of residents were under the age of 18; 12.3% were between the ages of 18 and 24; 21.6% were from 25 to 44; 22.5% were from 45 to 64; and 18.1% were 65 years of age or older. The gender makeup of the city was 47.7% male and 52.3% female.

== Education ==
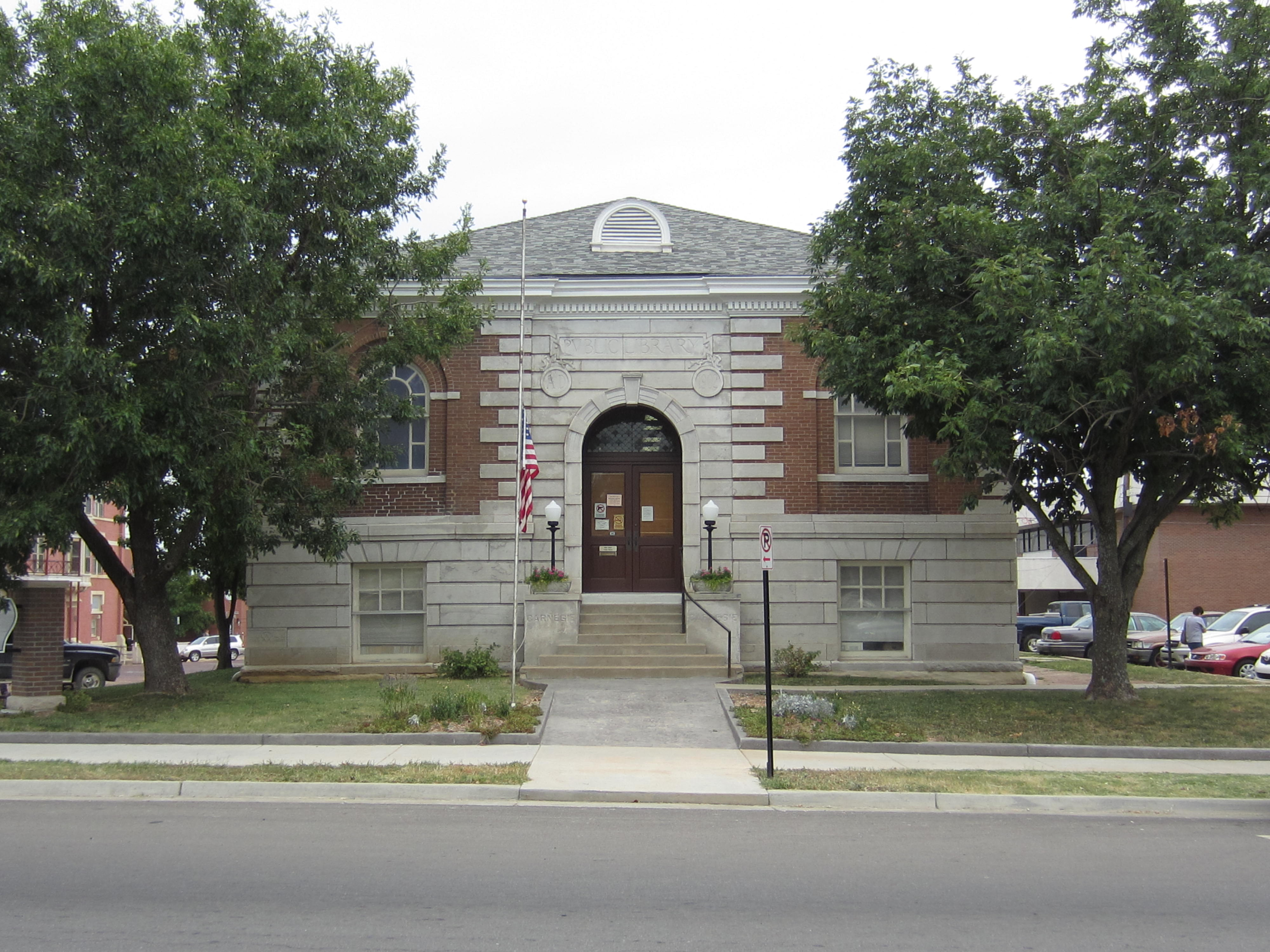
Fort Scott Carnegie Library (2013)

=== Colleges ===
Fort Scott Community College, founded in 1919, is the oldest community college in the state of Kansas.

=== Primary and secondary ===
The community is served by Fort Scott USD 234 public school district, which includes two public elementary schools (Eugene Ware Elementary and Winfield Scott Elementary), one public middle school (Fort Scott Middle School) and one high school (Fort Scott High School).

There is a Catholic school for grades K–5, Fort Scott Christian Heights for K–12 and a few other small private schools for students from grades K–12. There is also a public preschool in the old middle school building.

== Points of interest ==
=== Gunn Park ===
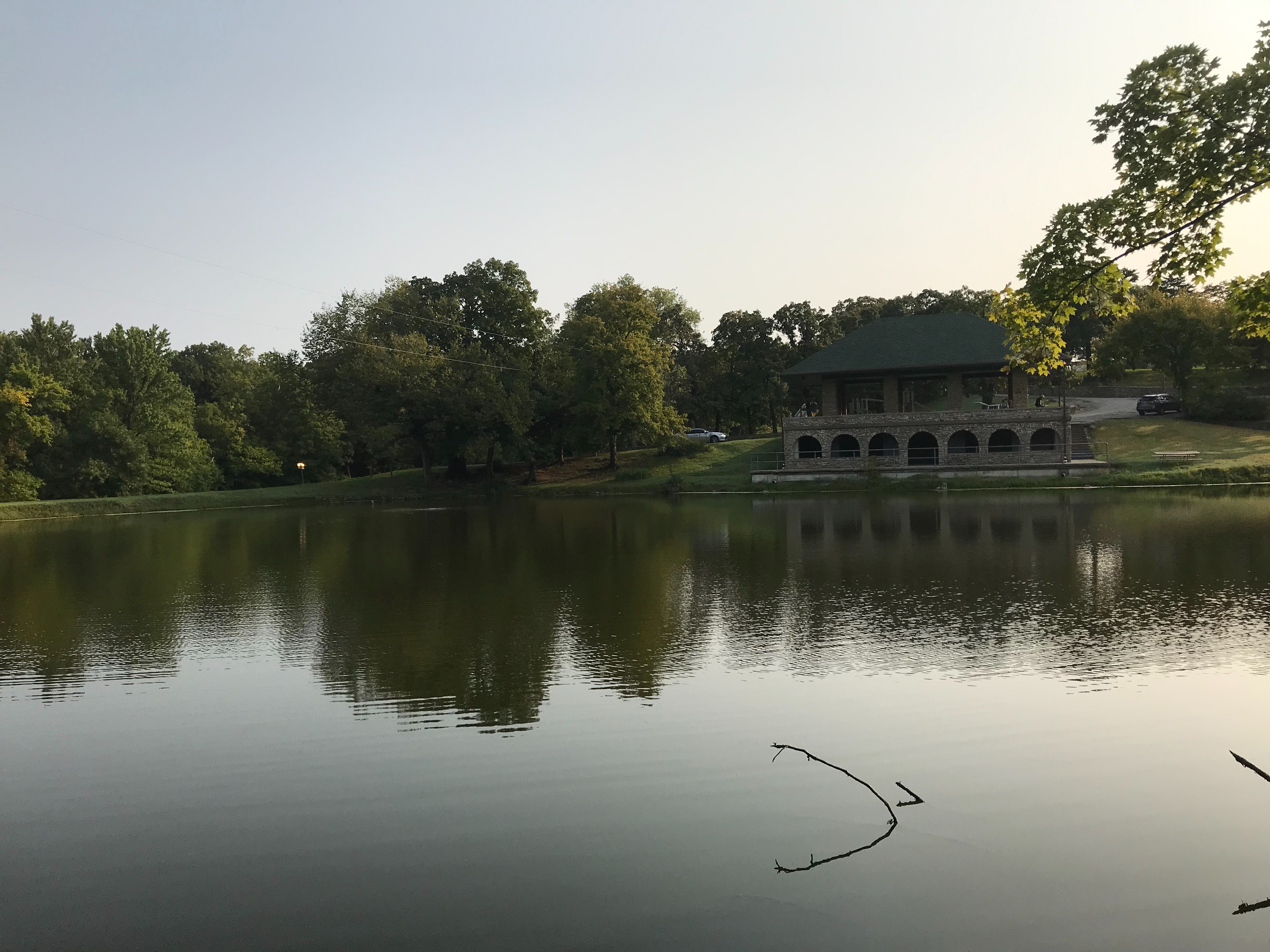
Shelter house 1 was one of the first structures built in the park.

Gunn Park is a 155-acre city-owned park that features seven shelter houses (four enclosed and three open), two lakes for fishing, several playground areas, and 14 camping sites with electricity and water.

A nine-hole Frisbee golf course was added in 1999 through a partnership with the City and the Kiwanis Club of Fort Scott. It has since been expanded to 18 holes.

There are two fishing lakes in the park. From October 15 to April 15, Fern Lake is stocked with trout.

About 6.5 miles of single-track mountain biking and hiking trails run through the park's wooded areas and along the Marmaton River.

The first stone shelter house was built in 1910 on the edge of Fern Lake. A large wooden theater once stood across the lake, seating up to 800 people. During special events such as the Fourth of July, streetcars reportedly carried as many as 10,000 visitors to the park in a single day.

== Media ==
- Fort Scott Tribune, twice-weekly newspaper, founded in 1884.
- KOMB 103.9 FM – Fort Scott Broadcasting. Classic and contemporary hits station, with talk shows throughout the week. Airs Kansas Jayhawks, Kansas City Chiefs, Kansas City Royals, Fort Scott Greyhounds and Fort Scott High School sports.
- KMDO 1600 AM, rebroadcast on an FM translator on 98.3. Plays a "Red dirt country" format.
- KVCY, 104.7 FM, a rebroadcaster for VCY America.

== Notable people ==
- Richard Christy – drummer, personality on The Howard Stern Show
- Clark Clifford – former United States Secretary of Defense
- Jerry Elliott – jurist
- Charles Hatfield – "rain maker"
- Mark Hart – musician, songwriter, producer
- William Hawkins – U.S. Marine awarded the Medal of Honor posthumously during World War II
- Stephen Johnson – music video director
- Adam LaRoche – retired Major League Baseball first baseman
- Andy LaRoche – former major league third baseman for the Pittsburgh Pirates.
- David Lowe – Kansas judge
- Bob Marshall — Kansas state senator
- Elmer McCollum – biochemist, discoverer of vitamin A
- William McDonald – first governor of the State of New Mexico; resident of Fort Scott.
- Gordon Parks – photographer, author, filmmaker, and composer
- Lon Ury – baseball player
