= Kansas Court of Appeals =

Intermediate appellate court of Kansas

The Kansas Court of Appeals is the intermediate-level statewide appellate court for the U.S. state of Kansas.

== History ==
The Kansas Legislature created the first Kansas Court of Appeals in 1895, to help the Kansas Supreme Court with an increasingly heavy caseload. The original statute that created the court contained a sunset provision that allowed the court to expire in 1901. The Court of Appeals was reestablished permanently in 1977 as a seven-member appellate court—expanded to ten judges in 1987, then later to twelve and then to fourteen.

== Jurisdiction ==
The Court of Appeals hears all appeals from orders of the State Corporation Commission, original actions in habeas corpus, and all appeals from the state district courts in both civil and criminal cases (except those that may be appealed directly to the Kansas Supreme Court).

== Procedures ==
Kansas Court of Appeals judges sit in panels of three at locations throughout the state, but most frequently at the primary courtroom in the Kansas Judicial Center in Topeka. The court also has the power to review matters en banc. Each panel typically rules on approximately 30 appeals over a two-day period every month. Decisions of the Court of Appeals are filed weekly, usually on Friday mornings.

There is no right to an appeal from the judgments of the Court of Appeals. Parties who lose their appeal in the Court of Appeals may petition the Kansas Supreme Court to review the decision, but the justices are not required to do so.

== Judges ==
Court of Appeals judges are appointed to four-year terms by the Governor of Kansas, with confirmation by the Kansas Senate. Until 2013, the Governor would appoint a justice from a list of qualified individuals submitted to him by the Kansas Supreme Court Nominating Commission. The judges go through a retention election after their initial appointment. The chief judge is elected by the members of the court. Before July 1, 2014, the Kansas Supreme Court appointed the chief judge.

The judges on the court are:

Seat	Name	Born	Start	Term ends	Mandatory retirement (Note: Judges must retire by the age of 75. However, Justices are allowed to serve out the remainder of their term during which they turn 75.)	Appointer	Law school
4	Sarah Warner, Chief Judge	November 15, 1979 (age 46)	July 1, 2019	2028	January 8, 2057	Laura Kelly (D)	Ave Maria
11	Tom Malone	December 29, 1953 (age 72)	May 2, 2003	2026	January 13, 2031	Kathleen Sebelius (D)	Washburn
1	Stephen Hill	December 18, 1950 (age 75)	December 5, 2003	2026	January 11, 2027	Kathleen Sebelius (D)	Washburn
8	Gordon Atcheson	May 17, 1954 (age 72)	September 10, 2010	2028	January 10, 2033	Mark Parkinson (D)	Kansas
9	Karen Arnold-Burger	October 7, 1957 (age 69)	February 14, 2011	2028	January 10, 2033	Mark Parkinson (D)	Kansas
6	David Bruns	September 17, 1959 (age 67)	May 16, 2011	2028	January 12, 2037	Sam Brownback (R)	Washburn
5	Kim Schroeder	July 11, 1957 (age 69)	March 15, 2013	2030	January 8, 2035	Sam Brownback (R)	Washburn
14	Kathryn Gardner	October 9, 1956 (age 70)	May 8, 2015	2028	January 10, 2033	Sam Brownback (R)	Kansas
3	Amy Cline	April 3, 1974 (age 52)	February 26, 2021	2030	January 9, 2051	Laura Kelly (D)	Kansas
2	Lesley Isherwood	December 2, 1972 (age 53)	April 30, 2021	2030	January 9, 2051	Laura Kelly (D)	Washburn
13	Jacy Hurst	September 9, 1979 (age 47)	May 3, 2021	2030	January 11, 2055	Laura Kelly (D)	Kansas
12	Angela Coble	August 20, 1972 (age 54)	May 2, 2022	2028	January 11, 2049	Laura Kelly (D)	Washburn
10	Rachel Pickering	1968 (age 57–58)	April 27, 2023	2028	January 9, 2045	Laura Kelly (D)	Missouri
7	Lori Fleming	November 19, 1973 (age 52)	April 30, 2025	2030	January 9, 2051	Laura Kelly (D)	Washburn

=== Vacancy and pending nomination ===
Vacator	Reason	Vacancy Date	Appointee	Announcement Date
Tom Malone	Retirement	January 11, 2027	–	September 4, 2026
Stephen Hill	Retirement	January 11, 2027	–	September 4, 2026

== See also ==
- Courts of Kansas
