= Van Bebber =

Van Bebber is a surname. Notable people with the surname include:

- George Thomas Van Bebber (1931–2005), American judge
- Jack van Bebber (1907–1986), American sport wrestler
- Jim Van Bebber (born 1964), American film director
- Wilhelm Jacob van Bebber (1841–1909), German meteorologist

== See also ==
- Van Bibber
