= Arthur Stanley =

Arthur Stanley may refer to:

- Arthur Stanley (politician) (1869–1947), British Conservative politician
- Arthur Stanley, 5th Baron Stanley of Alderley (1875–1931), English nobleman and Governor of Victoria
- Arthur Jehu Stanley Jr. (1901–2001), U.S. federal judge
- Arthur J. Stanley (1853–1935), English footballer and tennis player
- Arthur Penrhyn Stanley (1815–1881), Dean of Westminster
