= Eric F. Melgren =

American judge (born 1956)

Senior Judge of the United States District Court for the District of Kansas
- Incumbent
- Assumed office September 1, 2025

Chief Judge of the United States District Court for the District of Kansas
- In office December 1, 2021 – September 1, 2025
- Preceded by: Julie A. Robinson
- Succeeded by: John W. Broomes

Judge of the United States District Court for the District of Kansas
- In office October 6, 2008 – September 1, 2025
- Appointed by: George W. Bush
- Preceded by: Monti Belot
- Succeeded by: Jeffrey M. Kuhlman

Personal details
- Born: Eric Franklin Melgren; 1956 (age 69–70) Minneola, Kansas, U.S.
- Education: Wichita State University (BA); Washburn University (JD)

Eric Franklin Melgren (born 1956) is a senior United States district judge of the United States District Court for the District of Kansas.

== Education and career ==
Born in Minneola, Kansas, Melgren received a Bachelor of Arts degree from Wichita State University in 1979 and a Juris Doctor from Washburn University School of Law in 1985. He was a law clerk for Judge Frank G. Theis of the United States District Court for the District of Kansas from 1985 to 1987. He was in private practice in Wichita, Kansas, from 1987 to 2002, and then served as the United States Attorney for the District of Kansas from 2002 to 2008.

=== Notable prosecutions ===
In 2008, Melgren prosecuted the tax avoidance firm Renaissance, The Tax People for defrauding its clients out of at least $84 million, and secured a twenty-five year sentence against the firm's founder, Michael C. Cooper.

=== Federal judicial service ===
Melgren was nominated by President George W. Bush on July 23, 2008, to fill a seat in the District of Kansas vacated by Judge Monti Belot. He was confirmed by the United States Senate by a voice vote on September 26, 2008, and received his commission on October 6, 2008. He became chief judge on December 1, 2021, serving that position until on September 1, 2025 when he assumed senior status.

==== Notable cases ====
On January 3, 2022, the United States Court of Appeals for the Tenth Circuit held that it was "procedurally unreasonable" for Melgren to impose a harsher sentence on a defendant because she had pled guilty without reaching a plea agreement with the prosecution.

== Sources ==
Legal offices
Preceded by Monti Belot	Judge of the United States District Court for the District of Kansas; 2008–2025	Succeeded by Jeffrey M. Kuhlman
Preceded by Julie A. Robinson	Chief Judge of the United States District Court for the District of Kansas; 2021–2025	Succeeded by John W. Broomes
