= Kathryn H. Vratil =

American judge (born 1949)

Kathryn Hoefer Vratil
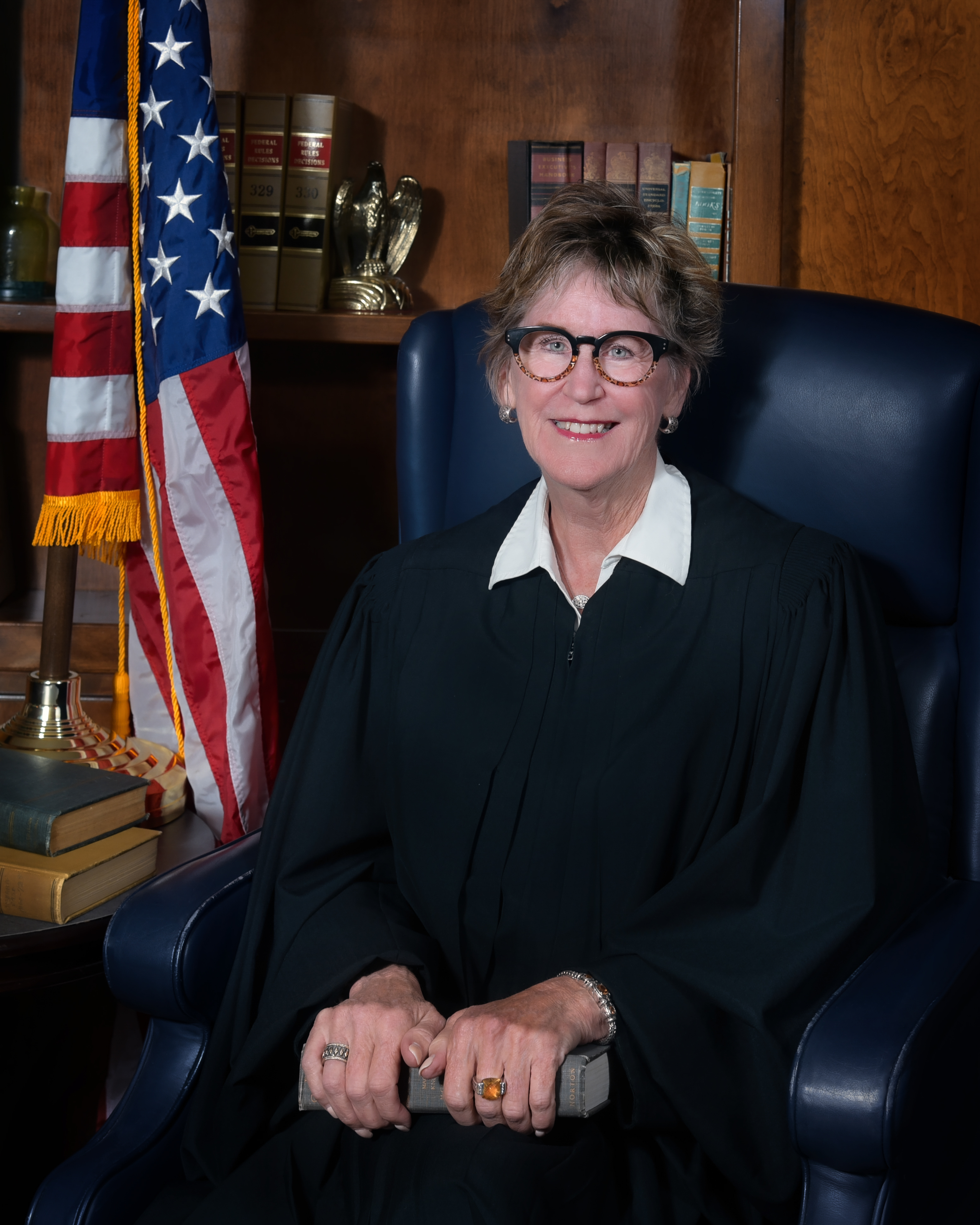

Senior Judge of the United States District Court for the District of Kansas
- Incumbent
- Assumed office April 22, 2014

Chief Judge of the United States District Court for the District of Kansas
- In office 2008–2014
- Preceded by: John Watson Lungstrum
- Succeeded by: J. Thomas Marten

Judge of the United States District Court for the District of Kansas
- In office October 9, 1992 – April 22, 2014
- Appointed by: George H. W. Bush
- Preceded by: Earl Eugene O'Connor
- Succeeded by: Holly Teeter

Personal details
- Born: Kathryn Louise Hoefer; April 21, 1949 (age 76) Manhattan, Kansas, U.S.
- Education: University of Kansas (BA, JD)

Kathryn Hoefer Vratil (born April 21, 1949) is a senior United States district judge of the United States District Court for the District of Kansas.

== Education and career ==
Vratil was born in Manhattan, Kansas. She received a Bachelor of Arts degree from the University of Kansas in 1971 and a Juris Doctor from the University of Kansas School of Law in 1975. She was a law clerk for Judge Earl Eugene O'Connor of the United States District Court for the District of Kansas from 1975 to 1978. She was in private practice in Kansas City, Kansas from 1978 to 1992. She was a judge on the Municipal Court of the City of Prairie Village, Kansas from 1990 to 1992.

=== Federal judicial service ===
On July 28, 1992, Vratil was nominated by President George H. W. Bush to a seat on the United States District Court for the District of Kansas vacated by Earl Eugene O'Connor. She was confirmed by the United States Senate on October 8, 1992, and received her commission on October 9, 1992. She became chief judge in 2008 and served in that capacity until she assumed senior status on April 22, 2014.

== Sources ==
Legal offices
Preceded by Earl Eugene O'Connor	Judge of the United States District Court for the District of Kansas; 1992–2014	Succeeded by Holly Teeter
Preceded by John Watson Lungstrum	Chief Judge of the United States District Court for the District of Kansas; 2008–2014	Succeeded by J. Thomas Marten
