= Anthony J. Powell =

American politician and jurist (born 1962)

Anthony Powell
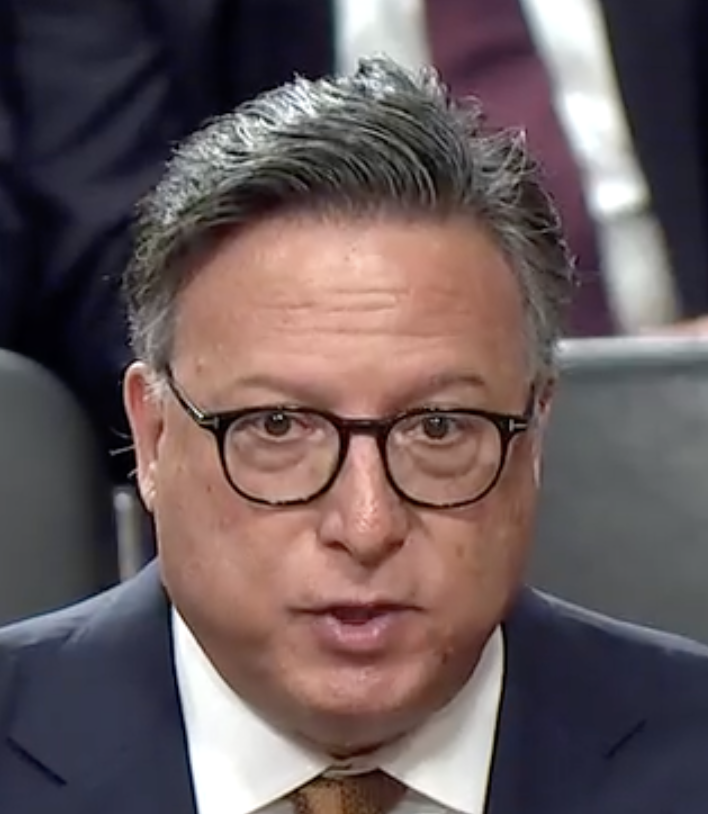
- Powell in 2026

Judge of the United States District Court for the District of Kansas
- Incumbent
- Assumed office June 18, 2026
- Appointed by: Donald Trump
- Preceded by: Julie A. Robinson

Solicitor General of Kansas
- In office January 9, 2023 – June 18, 2026
- Appointed by: Kris Kobach
- Preceded by: Brant Laue

Judge of the Kansas Court of Appeals
- In office January 12, 2013 – June 30, 2022
- Appointed by: Sam Brownback
- Preceded by: Richard D. Greene
- Succeeded by: Rachel L. Pickering

Judge of the Kansas District Court for Sedgwick County
- In office 2003 – January 12, 2013

Member of the Kansas House of Representatives from the 85th district
- In office 1995 – January 13, 2003
- Preceded by: Richard Lahti
- Succeeded by: Steve Brunk

Personal details
- Born: Anthony John Powell; 1962 (age 63–64) Saint Paul, Minnesota, U.S.
- Party: Republican
- Education: George Washington University (BA); Washburn University (JD)

Anthony John Powell (born 1962) is an American attorney, jurist, and former politician serving as a district judge of the United States District Court for the District of Kansas since 2026. He served as the solicitor general of Kansas from 2023 to 2026, and as a former judge of Kansas Court of Appeals from 2013 to 2022. Powell represented the 85th district in the Kansas House of Representatives as a Republican from 1995 to 2003.

== Early life and education ==
Powell was born in 1962, in Saint Paul, Minnesota. He received his Bachelor of Arts in political science from George Washington University in 1985 and his Juris Doctor from Washburn University School of Law in 1991.

== Political career ==
Powell served as a member of the Kansas House of Representatives for eight years as a Republican. In the state legislature, he held the positions of majority whip, chairman of several committees (including Federal and State Affairs, Ethics and Elections, and the Joint Committee on State-Tribal Relations), and vice-chairman of the Taxation Committee. He represented the 85th district.

== Legal career ==
=== Kansas District Court ===
In 2003, he was appointed as a judge on Sedgwick County District Court (eighteenth judicial district). He served in that role until early 2013, when he was appointed to the Kansas Court of Appeals.

=== Kansas Court of Appeals ===
On January 12, 2013, Kansas governor Sam Brownback elevated Powell to the Kansas Court of Appeals. Powell was appointed to the seat last held by the late Chief Judge Richard D. Greene. He was retained by voters in 2014. Powell retired from the Kansas Court of Appeals on June 30, 2022. On August 26, 2022, Governor Laura Kelly nominated Judge Rachel L. Pickering as Powell's successor. Pickering was unanimously confirmed by the Kansas Senate on January 22, 2023.

=== Solicitor General of Kansas ===
On December 18, 2022, Powell was named the Kansas Solicitor General, Kansas' top appellate attorney, by then state attorney general-elect Kris Kobach. Following the start of Kobach's term, Powell succeeded Brant Laue as Kansas Solicitor General on January 9, 2023.

=== Federal judicial service ===
On February 18, 2026, President Donald Trump announced that he would nominate Powell to serve as a federal judge on the United States District Court for the District of Kansas. On April 15, 2026, he testified with the Senate Judiciary Committee for his nomination to the District Court of Kansas. On May 14, 2026, his nomination was reported to the full Senate by a 12–10 party line vote. On June 10, 2026, the United States Senate invoked cloture on a 48–45 vote. On the same day he was confirmed by the Senate in a 50–44 vote. He received his judicial commission on June 18, 2026.

== Personal life ==
Powell and his wife, Betty, have four children. He is a member of Central Christian Church in Wichita.

Legal offices
Preceded by Richard D. Greene	Judge of the Kansas Court of Appeals; 2013–2022	Succeeded by Rachel L. Pickering
Preceded by Julie A. Robinson	Judge of the United States District Court for the District of Kansas; 2026–present	Incumbent
