= Holly Teeter =

American judge (born 1979)

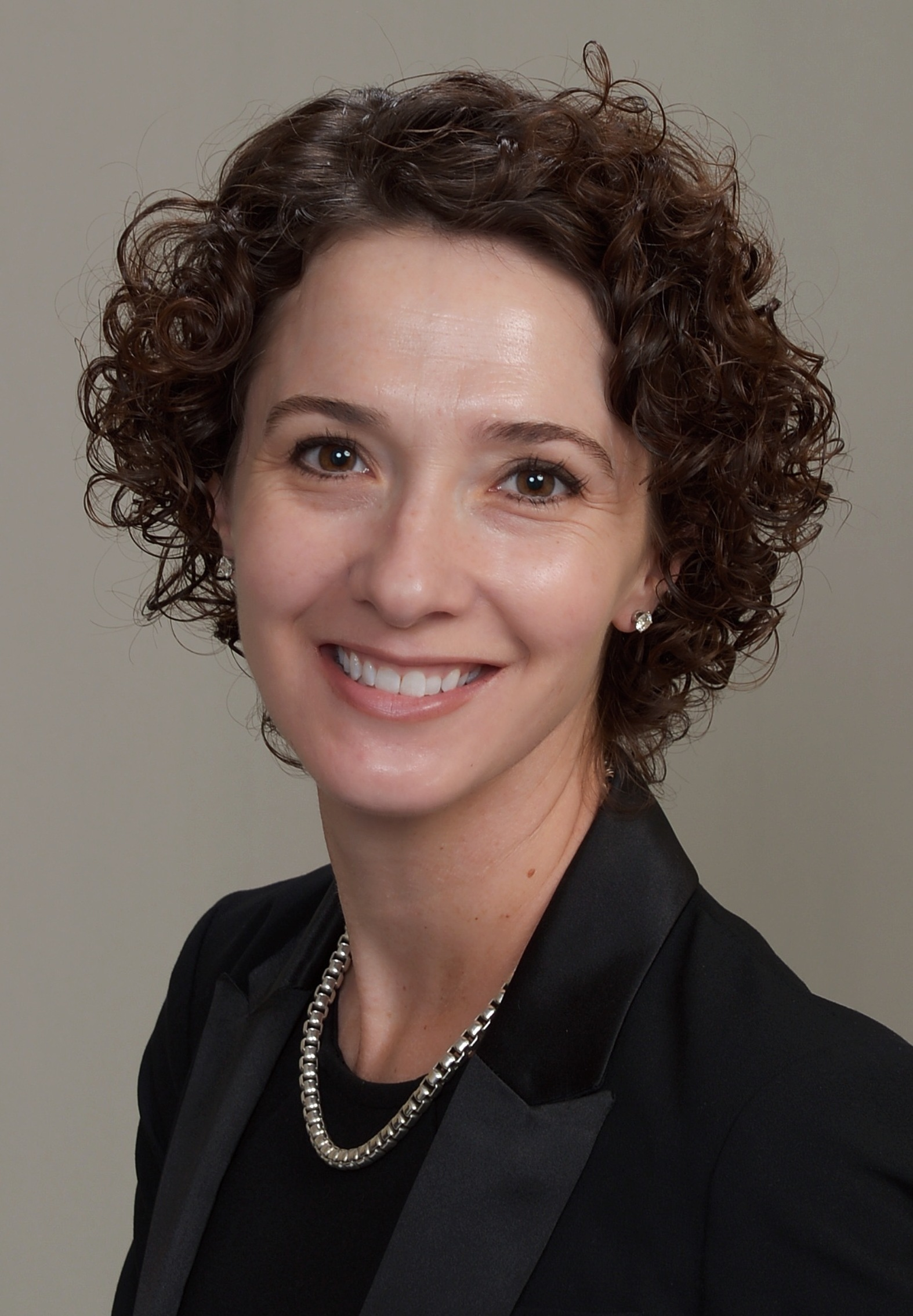

Judge of the United States District Court for the District of Kansas
- Incumbent
- Assumed office August 3, 2018
- Appointed by: Donald Trump
- Preceded by: Kathryn H. Vratil

Personal details
- Born: Holly Lou Hydeman; 1979 (age 46–47) Kansas City, Kansas, U.S.
- Education: University of Kansas (BS, JD); University of Oxford (GrDip)

Holly Lou Teeter (née Hydeman; born 1979) is a United States district judge of the United States District Court for the District of Kansas.

== Early life and education ==
Teeter was born Holly Lou Hydeman in 1979 in Kansas City, Kansas. She graduated from Shawnee Mission Northwest High School.

Teeter studied chemical engineering at the University of Kansas, graduating in 2002 with a Bachelor of Science with highest distinction. She earned a diploma in legal studies from the University of Oxford in 2003, then returned to the United States to attend the University of Kansas School of Law, where she was a member of the Kansas Law Review. She graduated in 2006 class Valedictorian with a Juris Doctor degree and Order of the Coif honors.

== Career ==
After graduating from law school, Teeter practiced patent law at Los Alamos National Security from 2006 to 2007 and at the Kansas City law firm Shook, Hardy & Bacon from 2007 to 2011. Teeter was a law clerk for judge Carlos Murguia of the U.S. District Court for the District of Kansas from 2011 to 2013 and for judge Brian C. Wimes of the U.S. District Court for the Western District of Missouri from 2013 to 2016.

In 2016, Teeter was hired by United States Attorney Tammy Dickinson to serve as an Assistant United States Attorney for Western District of Missouri in the office's Civil Division. Teeter worked at the United States Department of Justice until becoming a judge.

== Federal judicial service ==
On August 3, 2017, President Donald Trump nominated Teeter to serve as a United States district judge of the United States District Court for the District of Kansas, to the seat vacated by Judge Kathryn H. Vratil, who assumed senior status on April 22, 2014. On October 17, 2017, a hearing on her nomination was held before the Senate Judiciary Committee.

On November 7, 2017, Teeter received a "not qualified" rating from the American Bar Association (ABA). The ABA gave Teeter the rating because it believes that one must have 12 years of legal experience to be qualified for the federal bench. Teeter had 11 years and 11 months of experience at the time of the rating. Democratic U.S. Senator Richard Blumenthal called the ABA's standard "arbitrary", and Teeter's nomination gained bipartisan approval from the Judiciary Committee, which reported her nomination out of committee by a 19–1 vote on November 9, 2017. Judicial website The Vetting Room wrote that the ABA's rating was unlikely to impact Teeter's chance at being confirmed, as she has "stellar academic credentials" and has clerked only for judges nominated by Democratic presidents.

On January 3, 2018, her nomination was returned to the President under Rule XXXI, Paragraph 6 of the United States Senate. On January 5, 2018, Trump announced his intent to renominate Teeter to a federal judgeship. On January 8, 2018, her renomination was sent to the Senate. On January 18, 2018, her nomination was reported out of committee by a 21–0 vote. On August 1, 2018, her nomination was confirmed by voice vote. She received her judicial commission on August 3, 2018.

=== Notable rulings ===
- In Ricard v. USD 475 Geary County, KS School Bd. (2022), Judge Teeter held that a public school teacher had a First Amendment right to disclose the "preferred pronouns" of a student to that student's parents without the student's permission, notwithstanding district policy which purported to forbid such involuntary disclosures. Judge Teeter concluded that the district's policy constituted religious discrimination against the teacher, and interfered with "parents' exercise of a constitutional right to raise their children as they see fit."

Legal offices
Preceded by Kathryn H. Vratil	Judge of the United States District Court for the District of Kansas; 2018–present	Incumbent
