= John W. Broomes =

American judge (born 1969)

John Broomes
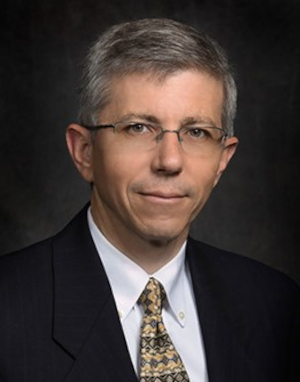

Chief Judge of the United States District Court for the District of Kansas
- Incumbent
- Assumed office September 1, 2025
- Preceded by: Eric F. Melgren

Judge of the United States District Court for the District of Kansas
- Incumbent
- Assumed office April 16, 2018
- Appointed by: Donald Trump
- Preceded by: J. Thomas Marten

Personal details
- Born: John Wesley Broomes; 1969 (age 56–57) New Orleans, Louisiana, U.S.
- Education: University of Texas, Austin (BS); Washburn University (JD)

Military service
- Allegiance: United States
- Branch/service: United States Navy (1991–1999); United States Navy Reserve (1996–1999)
- Rank: Lieutenant
- Unit: USS Hammerhead; USS Hammerhead; United States Navy Inactive Ready Reserve
- Awards: Navy and Marine Corps Commendation Medal; Navy and Marine Corps Achievement Medal (with bronze star)

John Wesley Broomes (born 1969) is the chief United States district judge of the United States District Court for the District of Kansas.

== Biography ==
Broomes graduated from the University of Texas at Austin in 1991 with a Bachelor of Science with high honors in petroleum engineering. From 1991 to 1996, Broomes served in the United States Navy Submarine Force, where his awards included the Navy and Marine Corps Commendation Medal and three Navy and Marine Corps Achievement Medals. Broomes later attended the Washburn University School of Law, where he was an editor of the Washburn Law Journal. He graduated in 2002 ranked first in his class with a Juris Doctor, summa cum laude.

Earlier in his career, he served as a law clerk to both Judge Monti Belot and Magistrate Judge Donald W. Bostwick on the United States District Court for the District of Kansas. Before becoming a judge, he was a member of the Hinkle Law Firm LLC in Wichita, Kansas, where he practiced in the firm's Business Litigation Group with a focus on natural resources law.

== Federal judicial service ==
On September 7, 2017, President Donald Trump nominated Broomes to serve as a United States District Judge of the United States District Court for the District of Kansas, to the seat vacated by Judge J. Thomas Marten, who assumed senior status on May 1, 2017. A hearing on his nomination before the Senate Judiciary Committee took place on November 15, 2017. On December 7, 2017, his nomination was reported out of committee by voice vote. On April 12, 2018, the United States Senate invoked cloture on his nomination by a 74–24 vote. His nomination was confirmed later that day by a voice vote. He received his judicial commission on April 16, 2018. He became the chief judge on September 1, 2025.

=== Notable rulings ===
- August 21, 2024, Judge Broomes, citing New York State Rifle & Pistol Association, Inc. v. Bruen, threw out charges against a Kansas man for illegal machine gun possession as unconstitutional under the Second Amendment.
- On November 1, 2024, Judge Broomes held that Lyft, Inc. could be sued under a products liability theory by a rideshare customer who was sexually assaulted. Judge Broomes cited to the multi-district litigation regarding sexual assaults on the Uber platform, In re Uber Techs., Inc., Passenger Sexual Assault Litig., No. MDL 3084 CRB, ––– F.Supp.3d ––––, ––––, 2024 WL 4211217, at *24 (N.D. Cal. Aug. 15, 2024), writing "Although finding that the Uber app was not a tangible product under the Restatement, Judge Charles Breyer of the Northern District of California ruled that the design and distribution of the Uber app was “sufficiently analogous to the distribution and use of tangible personal property that it is appropriate to apply the rules of strict liability.” Doe v. Lyft, Inc., No. 23-2548-JWB-TJJ, 2024 WL 4651015, at *3 (D. Kan. Nov. 1, 2024). Judge Broomes concluded "the facts as pled in this case are sufficient to establish that the Lyft app is a software or algorithmic product with sufficient similarities to a tangible product to subject it to product liability law."

Legal offices
Preceded by J. Thomas Marten	Judge of the United States District Court for the District of Kansas; 2018–present	Incumbent
Preceded by Eric F. Melgren	Chief Judge of the United States District Court for the District of Kansas; 2025–present	Incumbent
