= Monti Belot =

American judge (born 1943)

Senior Judge of the United States District Court for the District of Kansas
- Incumbent
- Assumed office March 4, 2008

Judge of the United States District Court for the District of Kansas
- In office November 25, 1991 – March 4, 2008
- Appointed by: George H. W. Bush
- Preceded by: Seat established by 104 Stat. 5089
- Succeeded by: Eric F. Melgren

Personal details
- Born: Monti Louis Belot; March 4, 1943 (age 83) Kansas City, Missouri, U.S.
- Education: University of Kansas (BA, JD)

Monti Louis Belot (born March 4, 1943) is an inactive senior United States district judge of the United States District Court for the District of Kansas.

== Early life and career ==
Belot was born in Kansas City, Missouri. He received a Bachelor of Arts degree from the University of Kansas in 1965 and a Juris Doctor from the University of Kansas School of Law in 1968. He was a United States Naval Reserve Legal officer, in the JAG Corps, from 1968 to 1971. He was a law clerk for Judge Wesley E. Brown of the United States District Court for the District of Kansas from 1971 to 1973. He was an assistant United States attorney in Topeka, Kansas from 1973 to 1976. He was a special assistant to the United States attorney in Topeka from 1976 to 1978. He was in private practice in Kansas City, Kansas from 1976 to 1983. He was in private practice in Coffeyville, Kansas from 1983 to 1991.

=== Federal judicial service ===
On July 26, 1991, Belot was nominated by President George H. W. Bush to a new seat on the United States District Court for the District of Kansas created by 104 Stat. 5089. He was confirmed by the United States Senate on November 21, 1991, and received his commission on November 25, 1991. He assumed senior status on March 4, 2008.

=== Schneider trial ===
Belot presided over the trial of Stephen and Linda Schneider, charged with illegally distributing prescription painkillers. In that capacity, he threw out all but 4 of the 56 alleged patient overdose deaths Assistant United States Attorney Tanya Treadway attempted to link to the Schneiders, "sternly warned Treadway not to appeal his decision [and] also instructed the government not to use inflammatory descriptions like 'pill mill' in front of the jury." Belot also denied federal prosecutor Tanya Treadway's request for a gag order on Pain Relief Network founder and pain relief advocate Siobhan Reynolds, as well as her request for a change of venue.

However, by the time Belot sentenced the Schneiders to 30 years in prison in October 2010, "he was so irritated by Reynolds' advocacy on behalf of the couple that he could not contain himself." In his sentencing opinion, "he digressed to take a swipe at Ms. Reynolds and her group, though he did not get its name quite right," saying "he hoped the prison sentences would 'curtail or stop the activities of the Bozo the Clown outfit known as the Pain Control Network, a ship of fools if there ever was one.' He added that the group and its leaders were 'stupid' and 'deranged.'" Journalist Jacob Sullum referred to these statements as "an extraordinary tirade against Reynolds and PRN, neither of which was a party to the case," adding:

Is Belot really saying that one function of the heavy sentences imposed on the Schneiders is to deter Reynolds and like-minded activists from speaking out against such prosecutions in the future? That's certainly what it sounds like. Reynolds seems to have a real talent for getting under the skin of people in power. But that is not a crime—or at least it shouldn't be.

== Sources ==
- Sentencing Opinion in the Schneider case

Legal offices
| Preceded by Seat established by 104 Stat. 5089 | Judge of the United States District Court for the District of Kansas; 1991–2008 | Succeeded by Eric F. Melgren |
