= James Kenneth Logan =

American judge (1929–2018)

Senior Judge of the United States Court of Appeals for the Tenth Circuit
- In office August 31, 1994 – July 15, 1998

Judge of the United States Court of Appeals for the Tenth Circuit
- In office December 16, 1977 – August 31, 1994
- Appointed by: Jimmy Carter
- Preceded by: Delmas Carl Hill
- Succeeded by: Mary Beck Briscoe

Personal details
- Born: James Kenneth Logan; August 21, 1929 Quenemo, Kansas, U.S.
- Died: September 8, 2018 (aged 89) Olathe, Kansas, U.S.
- Spouse: Beverly Jennings
- Education: University of Kansas (AB); Harvard Law School (LLB)

James Kenneth Logan (August 21, 1929 – September 8, 2018) was a United States circuit judge of the United States Court of Appeals for the Tenth Circuit.

== Education and career ==
Born in Quenemo, Kansas, Logan was a Corporal in the United States Army in the aftermath of World War II, from 1947 to 1948. He received an Artium Baccalaureus from the University of Kansas in 1952 and a Bachelor of Laws from Harvard Law School in 1955. Upon graduation from Kansas, Logan was awarded a Rhodes Scholarship in 1952. He was a law clerk for Judge Walter A. Huxman of the United States Court of Appeals for the Tenth Circuit from 1955 to 1956. He was in private practice in Los Angeles, California from 1956 to 1957. He was an assistant professor at the University of Kansas School of Law from 1957 to 1961. He was a dean and professor of law at the University of Kansas School of Law from 1961 to 1968. He was a United States Commissioner of the United States District Court for the District of Kansas from 1964 to 1967. He was an Ezra Ripley Thayer teaching fellow at Harvard Law School from 1961 to 1962. He was a visiting professor of law at the University of Texas School of Law in 1964. He was in private practice in Olathe, Kansas from 1968 to 1977. He was a visiting professor of law at Stanford Law School in 1969. He was a visiting professor of law at the University of Michigan Law School in 1976. He was a lecturer in law at the University of Kansas School of Law in 1982, and a lecturer in law at Duke University School of Law in 1987 and from 1991 to 1993.

== Federal judicial service ==
Logan was nominated by President Jimmy Carter on November 4, 1977, to a seat on the United States Court of Appeals for the Tenth Circuit vacated by Judge Delmas Carl Hill. He was confirmed by the United States Senate on December 15, 1977, and received his commission on December 16, 1977. He assumed senior status on August 31, 1994. Logan served in that capacity until July 15, 1998, due to retirement.

== Notable case ==
In 1984, Logan wrote the majority opinion in a ruling that struck down a law that permitted schools to fire teachers for homosexual conduct. The ruling, which can be seen as a precursor to Bostock v. Clayton County, was affirmed by an equally divided Supreme Court.

== Sources ==
Legal offices
| Preceded by Delmas Carl Hill | Judge of the United States Court of Appeals for the Tenth Circuit; 1977–1994 | Succeeded by Mary Beck Briscoe |
