= Earl Eugene O'Connor =

American judge (1922–1998)

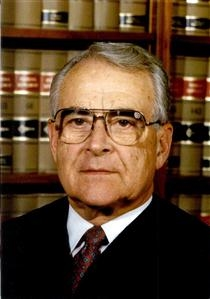

Senior Judge of the United States District Court for the District of Kansas
- In office March 1, 1992 – November 29, 1998

Chief Judge of the United States District Court for the District of Kansas
- In office 1981–1992
- Preceded by: Frank Gordon Theis
- Succeeded by: Patrick F. Kelly

Judge of the United States District Court for the District of Kansas
- In office November 1, 1971 – March 1, 1992
- Appointed by: Richard Nixon
- Preceded by: Arthur Jehu Stanley Jr.
- Succeeded by: Kathryn H. Vratil

Personal details
- Born: Earl Eugene O'Connor; October 6, 1922 Paola, Kansas
- Died: November 29, 1998 (aged 76) Mission, Kansas
- Education: University of Kansas (B.S.); University of Kansas School of Law (LL.B.)

Earl Eugene O'Connor (October 6, 1922 – November 29, 1998) was a United States district judge of the United States District Court for the District of Kansas.

== Education and career ==
O'Connor was born in Paola, Kansas. He served in the United States Army during World War II from 1942 to 1946. Following his military service, he pursued higher education at the University of Kansas, earning a Bachelor of Science degree in 1948 and a Bachelor of Laws from the University of Kansas School of Law in 1950.

He began his legal career in private practice in Mission, Kansas, from 1950 to 1951 before serving as an assistant county attorney for Johnson County, Kansas, from 1951 to 1953. He subsequently held judicial positions within the county, serving as a probate and juvenile court judge from 1953 to 1955 and as a district judge from 1955 to 1965.

In 1965, he was appointed as a justice of the Kansas Supreme Court, a position he held until 1971.

== Federal judicial service ==
On October 19, 1971, O'Connor was nominated by President Richard Nixon to a seat on the United States District Court for the District of Kansas vacated by Judge Arthur Jehu Stanley Jr. O'Connor was confirmed by the United States Senate on October 28, 1971, and received his commission on November 1, 1971. He served as Chief Judge from 1981 to 1992, assuming senior status on March 1, 1992. O'Connor served in that capacity until his death on November 29, 1998, in Mission.

== Sources ==
Legal offices
Preceded by Arthur Jehu Stanley Jr.	Judge of the United States District Court for the District of Kansas; 1971–1992	Succeeded by Kathryn H. Vratil
Preceded by Frank Gordon Theis	Chief Judge of the United States District Court for the District of Kansas; 1981–1992	Succeeded by Patrick F. Kelly
Preceded by William J. Wertz	Justice of the Kansas Supreme Court; 1965–1971	Succeeded by David Prager
