= Van Bibber =

Van Bibber is a surname. Notable people with the surname include:

- George Van Bibber (1909–1982), American football player, coach, and professor
- Geraldine Van Bibber (born 1951), Canadian politician

== See also ==
- Van Bebber
