= Sam A. Crow =

American judge (1926–2022)

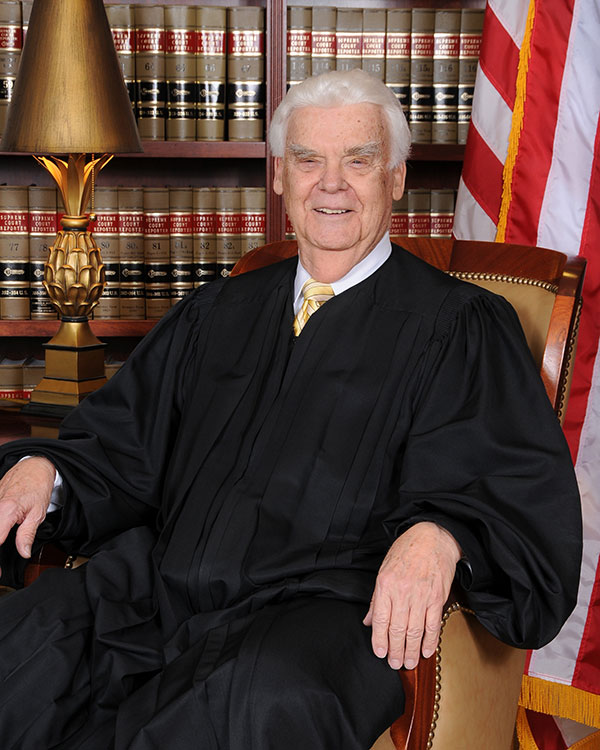

Senior Judge of the United States District Court for the District of Kansas
- In office November 15, 1996 – December 2, 2022

Judge of the United States District Court for the District of Kansas
- In office December 10, 1981 – November 15, 1996
- Appointed by: Ronald Reagan
- Preceded by: Frank Gordon Theis
- Succeeded by: Carlos Murguia

Magistrate Judge of the United States District Court for the District of Kansas
- In office 1975–1981

Personal details
- Born: Sam Alfred Crow; May 5, 1926 Topeka, Kansas, U.S.
- Died: December 2, 2022 (aged 96) Topeka, Kansas, U.S.
- Education: University of Kansas (BA); Washburn University (JD)

Samuel Alfred Crow (May 5, 1926 – December 2, 2022) was a United States district judge of the United States District Court for the District of Kansas.

== Education and career ==
Born in Topeka, Kansas, on May 5, 1926, Crow was a seaman in the United States Navy during World War II, from 1944 to 1945. He received a Bachelor of Arts degree from the University of Kansas in 1949 and a Juris Doctor from Washburn University School of Law in 1952. He was in private practice in Topeka from 1952 to 1953. Initially becoming a partner at Rooney, Dickinson, Prager & Crow in Topeka, Crow returned to active duty with the United States Army Reserve JAG Corps from 1953 to 1954 before returning to private practice in Topeka from 1954 to 1975.

=== Federal judicial service ===
Crow served as a United States magistrate judge on the United States District Court for the District of Kansas from 1975 to 1981. On November 24, 1981, he was nominated by President Ronald Reagan to a seat on the United States District Court for the District of Kansas vacated by Judge Frank Gordon Theis. Crow was confirmed by the United States Senate on December 9, 1981, and received his commission on December 10, 1981. He assumed senior status on November 15, 1996.

=== Notable case ===
In 1997, Crow presided over the case Koch v. Koch Industries filed in 1985 by Bill Koch against Koch Industries, the company founded by his brothers Charles and David. The lawsuit alleged that Koch Industries improperly hid assets in a 1983 settlement with Bill Koch. A federal jury ruled in 1998 that although Koch Industries concealed some facts from shareholders, the concealed facts did not significantly affect the price of the shares. Bill Koch did not earn any damages.

== Personal life and death ==
Crow died in Topeka on December 2, 2022, at the age of 96.

== Sources ==
Legal offices
Preceded by Frank Gordon Theis	Judge of the United States District Court for the District of Kansas; 1981–1996	Succeeded by Carlos Murguia
