= Minneola, Kansas =

City in Clark County, Kansas

- City
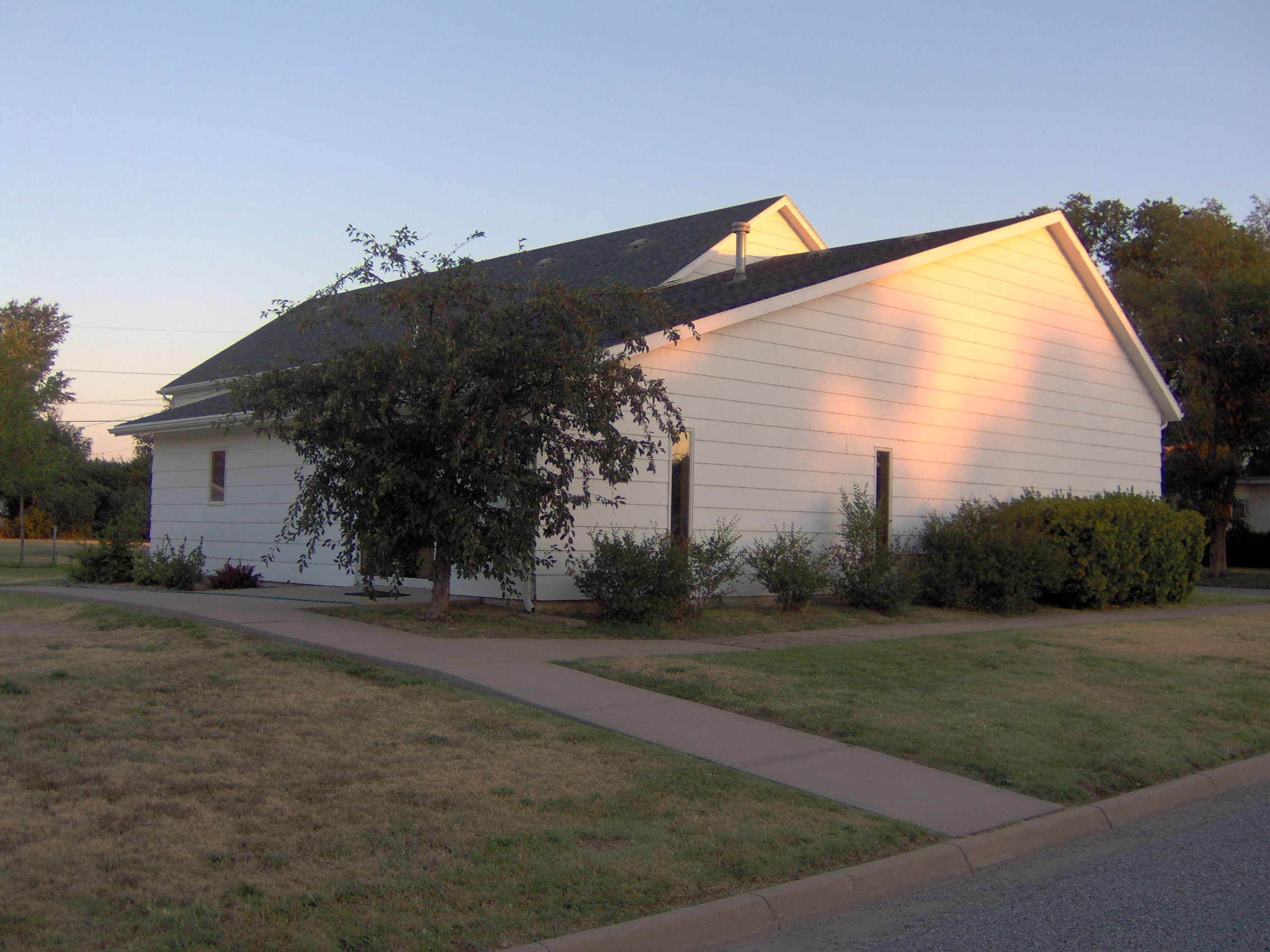
- Reformed Presbyterian church (2006)

- Location within Clark County and Kansas

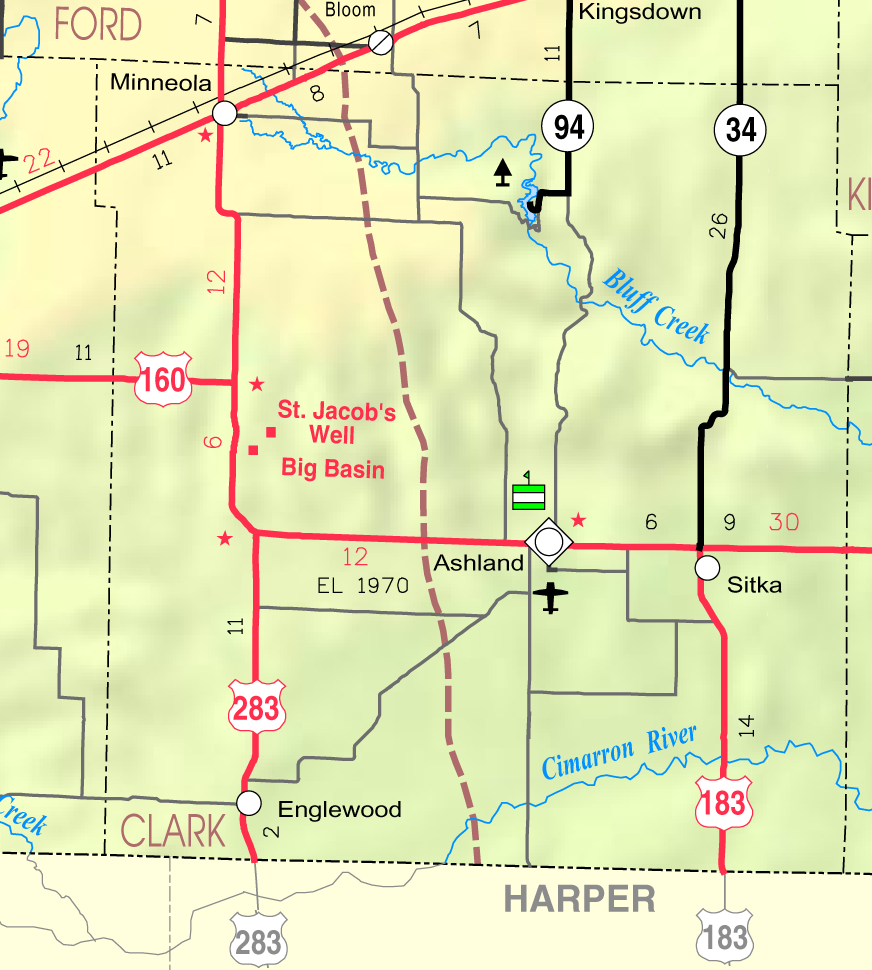
- KDOT map of Clark County (legend)
- Coordinates: 37°26′31″N 100°00′47″W
- Country: United States
- State: Kansas
- County: Clark
- Founded: 1887
- Incorporated: 1909

Area
  - Total: 0.46 sq mi (1.19 km^{2})
  - Land: 0.46 sq mi (1.19 km^{2})
  - Water: 0 sq mi (0.00 km^{2})
- Elevation: 2,549 ft (777 m)

Population (2020)
  - Total: 738
  - Density: 1,610/sq mi (620/km^{2})
- Time zone: UTC-6 (CST)
  - Summer (DST): UTC-5 (CDT)
- ZIP Code: 67865
- Area code: 620
- FIPS code: 20-47150
- GNIS ID: 2395347
- Website: minneolakansas.org

Minneola is a city in Clark County, Kansas, United States. As of the 2020 census, the population of the city was 738. It is located along U.S. Route 54 highway.

== History ==
Minneola was founded in 1887. Its name is a combination of that of Minnie Davis and Ola Watson, the wives of pioneer settlers. A post office first established in 1885 in Appleton (an extinct town) was moved to Minneola in 1888.

== Geography ==
According to the United States Census Bureau, the city has a total area of 0.46 square miles (1.19 km^{2}), all land. The city is roughly five blocks by eight blocks in size; everything is within walking or biking distance.

=== Climate ===
According to the Köppen Climate Classification system, Minneola has a semi-arid climate, abbreviated "BSk" on climate maps.

== Demographics ==
Historical population
| Census | Pop. | Note | %± |
|---|---|---|---|
| 1910 | 348 | | — |
| 1920 | 493 | | 41.7% |
| 1930 | 617 | | 25.2% |
| 1940 | 490 | | −20.6% |
| 1950 | 660 | | 34.7% |
| 1960 | 679 | | 2.9% |
| 1970 | 630 | | −7.2% |
| 1980 | 712 | | 13.0% |
| 1990 | 705 | | −1.0% |
| 2000 | 717 | | 1.7% |
| 2010 | 745 | | 3.9% |
| 2020 | 738 | | −0.9% |
U.S. Decennial Census

=== 2020 census ===
The 2020 United States census counted 738 people, 288 households, and 189 families in Minneola. The population density was 1,607.8 per square mile (620.8/km^{2}). There were 332 housing units at an average density of 723.3 per square mile (279.3/km^{2}). The racial makeup was 87.67% (647) white or European American (84.01% non-Hispanic white), 0.68% (5) black or African-American, 1.22% (9) Native American or Alaska Native, 1.49% (11) Asian, 0.0% (0) Pacific Islander or Native Hawaiian, 3.52% (26) from other races, and 5.42% (40) from two or more races. Hispanic or Latino of any race was 10.57% (78) of the population.

Of the 288 households, 34.7% had children under the age of 18; 53.5% were married couples living together; 25.7% had a female householder with no spouse or partner present. 30.6% of households consisted of individuals and 17.0% had someone living alone who was 65 years of age or older. The average household size was 2.3 and the average family size was 3.1. The percent of those with a bachelor's degree or higher was estimated to be 21.1% of the population.

26.8% of the population was under the age of 18, 7.6% from 18 to 24, 23.0% from 25 to 44, 21.1% from 45 to 64, and 21.4% who were 65 years of age or older. The median age was 38.4 years. For every 100 females, there were 107.3 males. For every 100 females ages 18 and older, there were 117.7 males.

The 2016–2020 5-year American Community Survey estimates show that the median household income was $53,056 (with a margin of error of +/- $10,495) and the median family income was $60,893 (+/- $26,572). Males had a median income of $46,023 (+/- $7,353) versus $25,078 (+/- $7,103) for females. The median income for those above 16 years old was $36,500 (+/- $7,414). Approximately, 7.1% of families and 10.4% of the population were below the poverty line, including 21.5% of those under the age of 18 and 6.1% of those ages 65 or over.

=== 2010 census ===
As of the census of 2010, there were 745 people, 289 households, and 194 families residing in the city. The population density was 1,619.6 inhabitants per square mile (625.3/km^{2}). There were 334 housing units at an average density of 726.1 per square mile (280.3/km^{2}). The racial makeup of the city was 95.6% White, 0.5% Native American, 1.2% Asian, 0.1% Pacific Islander, 0.4% from other races, and 2.1% from two or more races. Hispanic or Latino of any race were 4.2% of the population.

There were 289 households, of which 32.2% had children under the age of 18 living with them, 53.3% were married couples living together, 9.7% had a female householder with no husband present, 4.2% had a male householder with no wife present, and 32.9% were non-families. 30.1% of all households were made up of individuals, and 18% had someone living alone who was 65 years of age or older. The average household size was 2.45 and the average family size was 3.03.

The median age in the city was 42.9 years. 26.4% of residents were under the age of 18; 7.2% were between the ages of 18 and 24; 19.1% were from 25 to 44; 24% were from 45 to 64; and 23.2% were 65 years of age or older. The gender makeup of the city was 45.0% male and 55.0% female.

=== Religion ===
Minneola has three churches: CrossWalk Christian Church (formerly First Christian Church of Minneola), Minneola Independent Church, and Minneola Community Church. The three churches partner together through the Minneola Ministry Alliance to coordinate the serving of the local community.

== Economy ==
Originally eclipsing the nearby Appleton settlement because of its proximity to the Rock Island Rail line, Minneola now benefits from being at the intersection of U.S. Routes 54 and 283. The Minneola Co-op's grain elevator stands sentinel at the north edge of town along the rail line and is visible for miles around. Most businesses are focused on agricultural needs in this farming and ranching community. The Minneola Record, founded in 1906, is believed to have been the oldest continuously operating business in the town.

== Education ==
=== Primary and secondary ===
The community is served by Minneola USD 219 public school district. Minneola High School moved into a new building in 2006, complete with updated science labs and computer classes. Sports, band, and choir are offered. The school has about 80 students and 10 teachers. The school mascot is a Wildcat, and the school colors are purple and gold. The Minneola Wildcats won the Kansas State High School 8-Man football championship in 1980.

The grade school offers all students the small size and individual attention. The end of the school year in mid-to-late May is frequently celebrated with a parade through downtown. The event, known as Community Day, has been in existence for several decades.

=== Library ===
Minneola possesses a modern library, which circulates approximately 14,000 books and offers computer access to patrons.

== Infrastructure ==
The Minneola District Hospital is located in the city.

The City of Minneola also manages the Minneola Swimming Pool.

A volunteer fire department and the Clark County Sheriff's Department oversee public safety. In 2017 the city established a police department.

Centennial Park features a stone shelter built in the 1940s by local farmers using local rock; it was renovated around the time of the town's 100th birthday in 1987, when a war memorial was installed. After being closed for several years, the 1969-era town swimming pool has been completely renovated and offers swimming lessons during the warm months. The civic center hosts regular meetings and is available for meetings and parties; its kitchen cooks for 130 seniors in the region each weekday.

== Notable people ==
- Eric Melgren, United States federal judge.
