= Elinor Schroeder =

American lawyer

Elinor P. Schroeder

Academic background
- Education: University of Michigan Law School

Elinor Purves Schroeder is an American lawyer. She is the Paul E. Wilson Distinguished Professor Emeritus at the University of Kansas School of Law.

== Education ==
Schroeder obtained her B.A. and J.D. degrees from the University of Michigan and the University of Michigan Law School in 1968 and 1974 respectively. While at the University of Michigan, she was an associate editor of the Michigan Law Review.

== Career ==
Three years after graduation, Schroeder joined the University of Kansas School of Law faculty, where she was subsequently named the Paul E. Wilson Distinguished Professor. In 1984, Schroeder was inducted into the University of Kansas Women's Hall of Fame by the KU Commission on the Status of Women.

In 2014, Schroeder was elected a fellow of the College of Labor and Employment Lawyers for her contributions to labor and employment law.
