= 1960 United States Senate election in Kansas =

- November 8, 1960
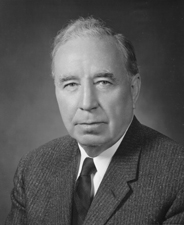

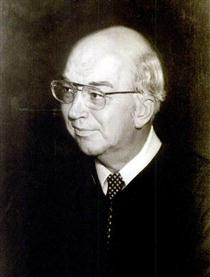
Nominee	Andrew F. Schoeppel	Frank Theis
Party	Republican	Democratic
Popular vote	485,499	388,895
Percentage	54.64%	43.77%
- County results Schoeppel: 40–50% 50–60% 60–70% 70–80% Theis: 50–60% 60–70%
U.S. senator before election
Andrew F. Schoeppel
Republican
Elected U.S. Senator
Andrew F. Schoeppel
Republican

The 1960 United States Senate election in Kansas took place on November 8, 1960. Incumbent Republican Senator Andrew Frank Schoeppel won re-election to a third term.

== Primary elections ==
Primary elections were held on August 2, 1960.

=== Democratic primary ===
==== Candidates ====
- Frank Theis, lawyer
- Joseph W. Henkle Sr., incumbent Lieutenant Governor of Kansas

==== Results ====
Democratic primary results
Party	Candidate	Votes	%
Democratic	Frank Theis	88,194	59.14
Democratic	Joseph W. Henkle Sr.	60,942	40.86
Total votes		149,136	

=== Republican primary ===
==== Candidates ====
- Henry P. Cleaver, clerk
- Andrew F. Schoeppel, incumbent U.S. Senator

==== Results ====
Republican primary results
Party	Candidate	Votes	%
Republican	Andrew F. Schoeppel (incumbent)	201,753	79.98
Republican	Henry P. Cleaver	50,507	20.02
Total votes		252,260	

== General election ==
=== Results ===
1960 United States Senate election in Kansas
Party	Candidate	Votes	%
Republican	Andrew Frank Schoeppel (Incumbent)	485,499	54.64
Democratic	Frank Theis	388,895	43.77
Prohibition	C. E. Cowen	14,198	1.60
Majority		96,404	10.87
Turnout		888,592	
Republican hold			

== See also ==
- 1960 United States Senate elections

== Bibliography ==
- Congressional Elections, 1946-1996. Washington, D.C.: Congressional Quarterly Inc. 1998. ISBN 1-56802-248-4.
