= Robert Coldsnow =

American politician

Member of the Kansas House of Representatives from the 73rd district
- In office January 9, 1967 – January 11, 1971
- Preceded by: Joseph J. Hill
- Succeeded by: Lynn Whiteside

Member of the Kansas House of Representatives from the 61st district
- In office January 11, 1965 – January 9, 1967
- Preceded by: Bruce R. Johnson
- Succeeded by: Merrell Welch

Personal details
- Born: September 26, 1924 Kansas City, Missouri, U.S.
- Died: January 23, 2014 (aged 89) Wichita, Kansas, U.S.
- Party: Republican
- Spouse: Dorothy Ainsworth (m. 1948)
- Education: University of Kansas; University of Kansas School of Law

Robert Allen Coldsnow (September 26, 1924 – January 23, 2014) was an American politician. He served as a member of the Kansas House of Representatives from 1965 to 1970. He was born in Kansas City, Missouri, and died in Topeka, Kansas. Coldsnow received his bachelor's degree from University of Kansas and his law degree from University of Kansas School of Law. He practiced law in Topeka, Kansas and later was the attorney for the Kansas State Legislature.
