= Raj Bhala =

American lawyer and academic (born 1962)

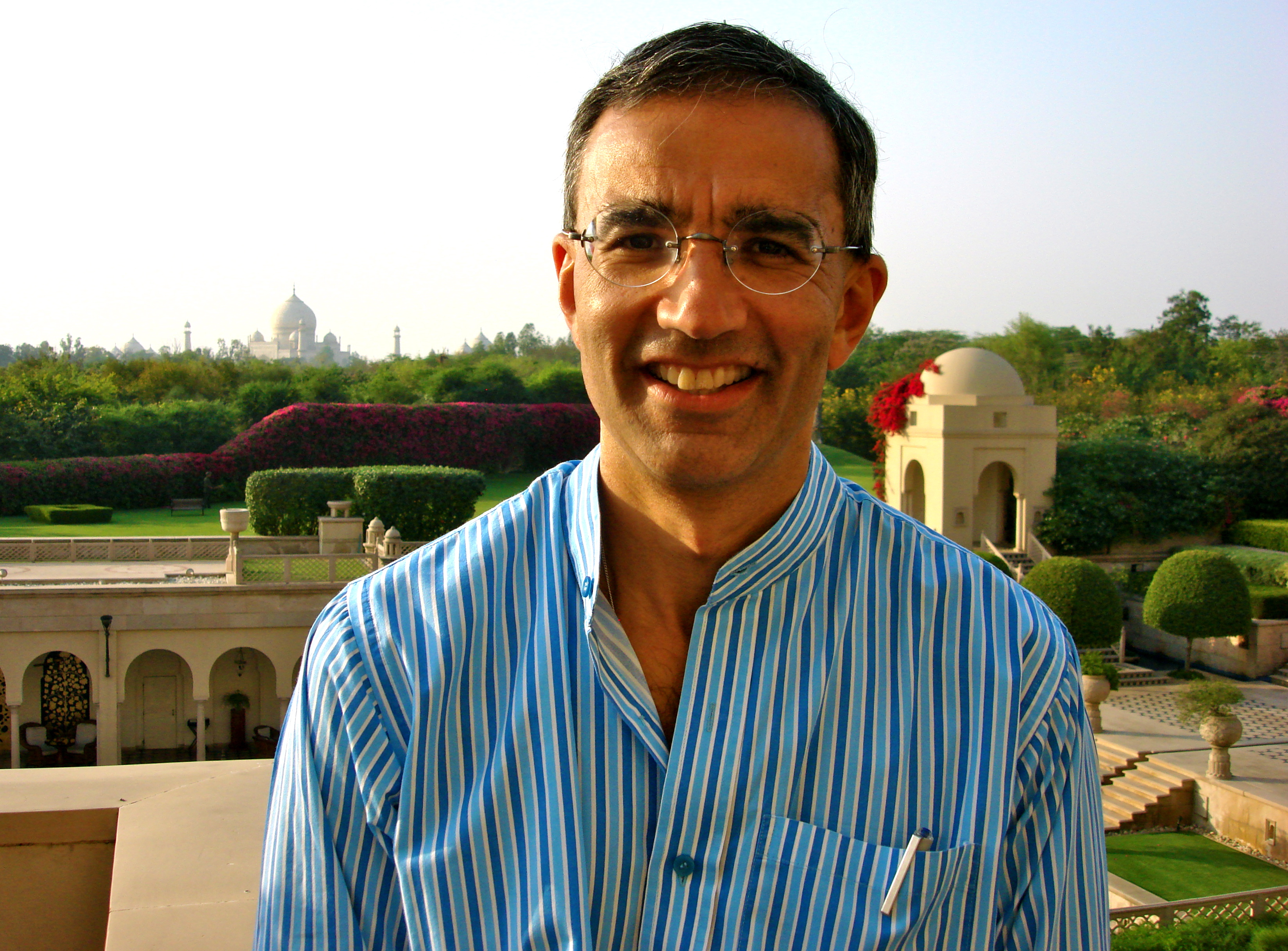
- Bhala, 2010, Agra, India
- Born: 1962 (age 63–64); Toronto, Ontario, Canada
- Spouse: Dr. Kara Tan Bhala
- Children: 1, Shera Tan Bhala

Academic background
- Education: Harvard Law School; Oxford University; London School of Economics; Duke University

Academic work
- Discipline: International Trade Law; Islamic Law (Sharia); Law and Literature
- Institutions: University of Kansas
- Website: law.ku.edu/faculty/raj-bhala

Rakesh "Raj" Kumar Bhala (born Toronto 1962 of Indian and Celtic heritage) is author, lawyer and professor, prominent in the fields of International trade law, Islamic Law (Sharia), and law and literature. He is a professor at the University of Kansas School of Law where he is the first University Distinguished Professor (UDP) at Kansas Law. His inaugural UDP lecture, delivered in September 2025, was entitled Deceitful Destruction of International Trade Law: America First and Xenophobic Autarky, and covered by media.

Previously, Bhala was the inaugural Leo S. Brenneisen Distinguished Professor of Law, and served as the university’s Associate Dean for International and Comparative Law (2011–2017). He is the author of leading textbooks in international trade law, among others, and of a periodic column on international law, titled “On Point,” published by BloombergQuint (India) (which in May 2022 was re-branded BQ Prime) from January 2017 through October 2022. In June 2020, Ingram’s Magazine named him as one of “50 Kansans You Should Know.” He is a member of the U.S. State Department Speaker Program, and a Fulbright Specialist in international trade law and law and literature.

On international trade, Bhala has appeared on Legal Talk Network, and On with Kara Swisher. He has been quoted by media in Australia, Bulgaria, Canada, China, Germany, Hong Kong, India, Japan, Korea, Turkey, and the U.S.

On law and literature, Bhala was the Featured Scholar for the Humanities Kansas Big Idea Series on “East to Midwest: Asian American Perspectives in Kansas,” presenting on “From International Trade to Shakespeare’s Stage: Asian American Angles on Law and Literature.

== Education ==
Bhala is a 1980 graduate of University School of Milwaukee. Bhala then received his A.B. degree in economics (summa cum laude) at Duke University in 1984, and was inducted into Phi Beta Kappa.

While a Marshall Scholar (1984–86) in the United Kingdom, Bhala earned a master's degree (MSc) in economics from the London School of Economics in 1985 and another master's degree (MSc) in management (industrial relations) from Oxford University the year after, with a thesis on internal labor markets.

Bhala obtained a J.D. degree (cum laude) from Harvard Law School in 1989, where as a third-year student he published his first book, Perspectives on Risk-Based Capital.

== Legal career ==
Upon graduation from Harvard Law School, Bhala practiced as an attorney with the legal department of the Federal Reserve Bank of New York (1989–93), specializing in three areas: payment systems, foreign exchange, and enforcement. The New York Fed twice (November 1990 and December 1992) awarded him its President's Award for Excellence, in part for his work as a United States delegate to the United Nations Convention on International Trade Law (UNCITRAL) in drafting the 1992 Model Law on International Credit Transfers, for which he also received a Letter of Commendation from the U.S. State Department (September 1991). Subsequently, he wrote books in each of these three areas. Bhala was a Senior Advisor to Dentons US LLP, where he specialized in international trade law and related matters. He has served as an International Legal Consultant for The Al Ammari Law Firm, in association with Blake, Cassels & Graydon LLP in Bahrain and Saudi Arabia.

He held his first academic post (1993–98) at the Marshal-Wythe School of Law at William & Mary. At his second post (1998–2003) at the George Washington Law School in Washington, D.C., Bhala held the Patricia Roberts Harris Research Professorship.

Bhala joined the University of Kansas School of law faculty in 2003, where he teaches courses in international trade law, advanced international trade law, Islamic law, and law and literature. For his teaching and advising there, he received the Kemper Teaching Award (2008), George and Eleanor Woodyard International Educator Award (2011), and Moreau Award (2012 and 2015) Bhala also served as an instructor at the Command and General Staff College, Fort Leavenworth, Kansas, where he taught Islamic Law to U.S. Special Operations Forces. He has been a visiting professor at Washington University in St. Louis School of Law (2014), University of Michigan Law School (1999), and Duke University School of Law (1996). Outside the United States, he has taught courses at the Heidelberg Centre for Latin America (Santiago, Chile, 2012), World Trade Institute (Berne, Switzerland, 2003 and 2004), La Trobe University (Melbourne, Australia, 2003), Tel Aviv University (2019), University of Auckland (2003, 2017, and 2019), University of London (1997), and been a Research Fellow at the University of Hong Kong (2009) and Visiting Scholar at the Bank of Japan (Tokyo, 1999), and lectured widely in India (2004, 2012, and 2014). Bhala negotiated Memoranda of Understanding (MOUs) for the University of Kansas School of Law with foreign law faculties in India. In March 2014, CNBC TV-18 in India interviewed Bhala for his views on Indo-U.S. trade disputes. Following resolution of the dispute over public stockpiling of food for security, the London-based Oval Observer Foundation interviewed him about Indian trade policy and the future of free trade agreements (FTAs) and the World Trade Organization (WTO).

In January 2014, Bhala was one of over 80 Distinguished Professors in Kansas to sign a letter calling for suspension and ultimate repeal of the social media policy adopted the previous month by the state's Board of Regents. The letter was published simultaneously in The Lawrence Journal World, The Manhattan Mercury, and The Topeka Capital Journal. The Policy attracted nationwide condemnation, including from the American Association of University Professors, (AAUP) and jointly from the American Civil Liberties Union (ACLU), Foundation for Individual Rights in Education (FIRE), and National Coalition Against Censorship (NCAP). Bhala also expressed his concern about the scope of the Policy on television. In April 2014, along with 80 other Distinguished Professors from across Kansas, he signed a petition in favor of a revised Policy. The revision was published widely, and widely supported, but, the Regents essentially rejected it, retaining the controversial elements concerning speech that undermines harmony at, or efficient operation of, a university.

In October 2014, Bhala appeared on the TV comedy show, The Not So Late Show. In December 2014, he commented in a TV interview that the release of the U.S. Senate report on enhanced interrogation techniques (torture) by the CIA showed not only a disconnect between the myth and reality of American support for human rights, but also (ultimately) the strength of America and its commitment to the rule of law. In a New Zealand radio interview, Bhala spoke about the meaning of "enhanced interrogation techniques", and the lack of any justification for torture.

In December 2015, Bhala was one of 70 University of Kansas Distinguished Professors to sign a letter of protest against a change in state law allowing the carrying of concealed weapons on campus. In April, 2016, he was one of 64 Distinguished Professors to sign a second such letter. Bhala, along with his wife, Dr. Kara Tan Bhala, were featured by journalist Arun Venugopal in a May 2017 National Public Radio (NPR) New York (WNYC, 93.3 FM) broadcast, "Whose Kansas is it Anyway?," explaining the negative effects of the concealed carry law. In January 2021, they were featured in Venugopal's follow up NPR New York broadcast, "The (Un)making of a Model Minority."

Bhala was selected by the New Zealand Legal Research Foundation (LRF) as its 2017 Visiting Scholar.

== International trade law, Islamic law, and Law and Literature contributions ==
In international trade law, Bhala's Stare Decisis Trilogy was the first to highlight that, in practice, the doctrine of precedent operates in multilateral trade adjudication.

His Doha Round Trilogy pointed out that the detailed negotiating texts of the round had deviated from a key original purpose of the round: re-writing trade rules to help alleviate poverty, and thereby reduce the vulnerability of marginalized populations to Islamist extremist ideologies.

Bhala's articles appear in general and international law reviews, and six are in The International Lawyer, the award-winning, peer-reviewed journal of the American Bar Association (ABA) Section of International Law, which circulates worldwide to over 15,000 readers. The Arizona Journal of International and Comparative Law publishes the annual WTO Case Review, which Bhala co-authored since its inception in 2000.

Bhala authored Modern GATT Law, the first major treatise on the General Agreement on Tariffs and Trade since the 1970 publication of The Law of the GATT (Kenneth W. Dam) and 1969 publication of World Trade and the Law of GATT (John H. Jackson). The Appellate Body of the World Trade Organization (WTO) cited the 1st edition of the treatise, and its 2nd edition received scholarly and media attention.

He also has authored the textbook International Trade Law, which has been cited by United States federal courts, and portions of this text were translated into Vietnamese. The fifth edition, with the sub-title "A Comprehensive Textbook," was in four volumes, and like the previous two-volume edition bearing the subtitle "An Interdisciplinary, Non-Western Textbook," was endorsed by trade experts in different countries, including Columbia University Professor Jagdish Bhagwati, and been profiled in the media. The sixth edition, sub-titled "A Comprehensive E-Textbook," is in eight volumes and available via Open Access on KU ScholarWorks. Bhala's monograph Trade, Development, and Social Justice, applies Catholic social justice theory to special and differential treatment rules of the multilateral trading system. His monograph Trade War: Causes, Conduct, and Consequences of Sino-American Confrontation is an interdisciplinary legal analysis of the origins, nature, and future of tariff and non-tariff battles between the U.S. and China.

In Islamic Law, Bhala became the first non-Muslim American law professor to produce a textbook on the subject designed for English-speaking law students, teachers, and practitioners (Understanding Islamic Law (Shari'a)). He has spoken out against state anti-Sharia legislation, arguing it is unfair and bad for business. The textbook has received media attention, such as after the November 2015 Paris attacks, and has been reviewed as a "brilliant and much-needed resource". It is in its third edition.

Some of Bhala's research is at the intersection of International Trade and Islamic Law. One article analyzes the tariff schedules of every Islamic country in the world, and points out few such countries use the GATT Article XX(a) public morality exception to ban importation of products, such as alcohol and pork, the consumption of which the Sharia forbids. Like non-Islamic countries, most of them impose tariffs on these products, possibly for moral, secularist, legal, or economic reasons.

Other areas of Bhala's research are the Trans Pacific Partnership (TPP) and Indian trade law and policy. His book TPP Objectively examines the legal, economic, and national security aspects of TPP, arguing the deal merits a grade of "B," and calls for stronger provisions to benefit women and their extension to the LGBTQ+ community. In December 2022, Bhala testified to the United Kingdom Parliament, House of Commons, International Trade Committee, Human Rights Session for U.K.–GCC Trade Inquiry about the use of FTAs to create positive change for women and LGBTQ+ persons. Via scholarly presentations and media appearances in India, he urged India to consider joining TPP. Speaking in Riyadh at the Council of Saudi Chambers of Commerce and Harvard Alumni Association of Saudi Arabia (HASA) in April 2015, he discussed reorienting Saudi trade law and policy toward the Asia-Pacific region. He addressed the Association of South East Asian Nations (ASEAN) Law Association of Malaysia, and justices from the Supreme and High Courts of Malaysia, in April 2016 on the topic of Risks and Opportunities with the Trans-Pacific Partnership for Malaysia.

He delivered a major address at the University of Pittsburgh School of Law in February 2017, The Legal, Economic, and National Security Dimensions of the Trans Pacific Partnership. He gave Webinars for the Conference Board of Canada in August 2017, An American Perspective on NAFTA's Past, Present, and Future; October 2018, The Three-Dimensional International Trade War: Strategic Positioning for Canada in WTO, NAFTA, and Bilateral Battles, and October 2020, Restructuring Global Trade Amidst the COVID-19 Pandemic: A Matrix of Challenges and Opportunities.

In June 2021, he was a Distinguished Speaker at the Indian Society of International Law, lecturing on Historical Evolution of GATT and WTO, and in March 2022 he presented at the Horasis USA Global Summit Conference on "Shaping America's Role in a Post-Pandemic World" on the topic of Revival of Substantial World Trade. For India's Center for International Trade and Investment Law, co-sponsored with India's Department of Commerce and the Indian Institute of Foreign Trade, Bhala lectured at a capacity-building workshop on negotiating free trade agreements in September 2022, and delivered Keynote Addresses in February 2023 on trade fragmentation and May 2024 on Indian trade strategy amidst global turbulence.[NEW FN C]

Bhala's research includes law and literature. His publications in this field include Lessons About NAFTA Renegotiations from Shakespeare's Othello: From the Three Amigo's to America as Iago?, Interpreting Interpretation: Textual, Contextual, and Pragmatic Interpretative Methods for International Trade Law, and Shakespeare And The Law of War: Spotting Issues In The Second Henriad.

== Publications ==
- Trade War: Causes, Conduct, and Consequences of Sino-American Confrontation (Durham, North Carolina: Carolina Academic Press, 2024)
- Bhala, Raj (2020). TPP Objectively: Legal, Economic, and National Security Dimensions of CPTPP (2 ed.). Carolina Academic Press. ISBN 9781531014292.
- Modern GATT Law: A Treatise On The Law And Political Economy Of The General Agreement On Tariffs And Trade And Other World Trade Organisation Agreements (London, England: Thomson Sweet & Maxwell, 2nd Ed., Two Volumes, 2013) (1st Edition, 2005)
- Understanding Islamic Law: Sharīʻa (Durham, North Carolina: Carolina Academic Press, 2nd Edition, August 2016), (New Providence, New Jersey: Lexisnexis, 1st Edition, May 2011)
- International Trade Law: A Comprehensive Textbook (Durham, North Carolina: Carolina Academic Press, 5th Ed., Four Volumes, July 2019; New Providence, New Jersey Lexisnexis, 4th Ed., Two Volumes, August 2015; 3rd Ed. 2008, Lexisnexis; 2nd Ed. 2001; 1st Ed. 1996 (Michie)
- Dictionary of International Trade Law (New Providence, New Jersey: Lexisnexis, 3rd Edition 2015, 2nd Ed. 2012, 1st Ed. 2008)
- Trade, Development, and Social Justice (Durham, North Carolina: Carolina Academic Press. 1st Ed., 2003)
- World Trade Law: The GATT-WTO System, Regional Arrangements, and U.S. Law, with 1999 Supplement (Charlottesville, Virginia: Lexis Law Publishing, 1998) (With Kevin Kennedy)
- The Law of Foreign Exchange (Durham, North Carolina: Carolina Academic Press, 1997)
- Foreign Bank Regulation After BCCI (Durham, North Carolina: Carolina Academic Press, 1994)
- Wire Transfers (Chicago, Illinois: Irwin/Probus, 1993) (With Ernest T. Patrikis & Thomas C. Baxter, Jr)
- Perspectives on Risk-Based Capital (Rolling Meadows, Illinois: Probus/Bank Administration Institute, 1989)

== Affiliations ==
Bhala is a member of the Council on Foreign Relations (United States), and a life member of the Indian Society of International Law. He is also a member of the Royal Society for Asian Affairs (England), All India Law Teachers Congress (India), American Law Institute, Fellowship of Catholic Scholars, International Bar Association, and Inter-Pacific Bar Association.

Bhala serves on the Editorial Advisory Board of Carolina Academic Press, where he also is the general editor for its studies on globalization and society. Bhala has served on the Publishing Advisory Board of LexisNexis.

Bhala is on the editorial boards of international law journals, including the Indian Journal of International Economic Law, the University of Bologna Law Review, and Manchester Journal of International Economic Law (MJIEL), and is a Chief Book Review Editor for the MJIEL.

He is a member of the Whitney R. Harris World Law Institute's International Council.
