= Julie A. Robinson =

American judge (born 1957)

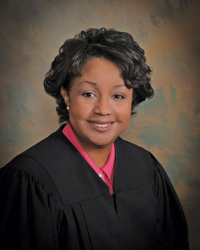

Senior Judge of the United States District Court for the District of Kansas
- Incumbent
- Assumed office January 14, 2022

Chief Judge of the United States District Court for the District of Kansas
- In office May 1, 2017 – December 1, 2021
- Preceded by: J. Thomas Marten
- Succeeded by: Eric F. Melgren

Judge of the United States District Court for the District of Kansas
- In office December 13, 2001 – January 14, 2022
- Appointed by: George W. Bush
- Preceded by: George Thomas Van Bebber
- Succeeded by: Anthony J. Powell

Personal details
- Born: January 14, 1957 (age 69) Omaha, Nebraska
- Education: University of Kansas (BS, JD)

Julie Ann Robinson (born January 14, 1957) is a senior United States district judge of the United States District Court for the District of Kansas.

== Education and career ==
Born in Omaha, Nebraska, Robinson received a Bachelor of Science from the University of Kansas in 1978 and a Juris Doctor from the University of Kansas School of Law in 1981. She was a law clerk in private practice in Kansas in 1981. She was a law clerk for Judge Benjamin E. Franklin of the United States Bankruptcy Court from 1981 to 1983. She was an Assistant United States Attorney of the United States Attorney's Office for the District of Kansas from 1983 to 1992. She was an adjunct faculty member at the University of Kansas School of Law from 1989 to 1990.

She served as a senior litigation counsel for the United States Attorney's Office for the District of Kansas from 1992 to 1994. She was a Judge of the United States Bankruptcy Appellate Panel of the Tenth Circuit from 1996 to 2001. Robinson was appointed by Chief Justice John Roberts to chair the federal judiciary's Court Administration and Case Management Committee (CACM) from around 2011 through 2014. Roberts also appointed Robinson to the federal judiciary’s Budget Committee and the Workplace Conduct Committee, the Federal Judicial Center’s District Judge Benchbook Committee, and to serve as a commissioner of the U.S. Supreme Court Fellows Program. Robinson also serves on the Law and Technology Committee of the National Academies of Sciences, Engineering and Medicine.

Robinson has also taught trial practice at the University of Kansas School of Law and later served on the University of Kansas School of Law Board of Governors. Robinson has been the recipient of several awards, including a distinguished alumni award from the University of Kansas School of Law, the KBA Distinguished Service Award, the KBA Courageous Judge Award, and has been inducted into the Women’s Hall of Fame at the University of Kansas, into the Kansas African American Museum Trailblazer Hall of Fame, and was the first recipient of the Judge Julie A. Robinson Award, which is an annual award presented by the Bankruptcy Court for outstanding community leadership.

== Federal judicial service ==
Robinson was nominated to be a United States District Judge by President George W. Bush on September 10, 2001, to a seat vacated by George Thomas Van Bebber. She was confirmed by the United States Senate on December 11, 2001, and received her commission on December 13, 2001. She became the first African-American woman to serve in this position. Robinson served as Chief Judge from May 1, 2017 to December 1, 2021. She assumed senior status on January 14, 2022, her 65th birthday.

== Notable cases ==
On September 7, 2016, Judge Robinson found that for-profit prison operator, Corrections Corporation of America, had illegally recorded phone calls between attorneys and their incarcerated pre-trial clients at its Leavenworth, Kansas prison. Defense attorneys representing inmates objected after discovering their privileged conferences with clients had been recorded, despite CoreCivic having repeatedly assured them the meetings would be kept private. Robinson scolded prosecutors for speeding forward with an alleged prison contraband case, which she called a “horrendous situation. Robinson said, "You all need to get your act together," Robinson authorized wide latitude devoted to an investigation into recordings of phone calls and video of meetings between attorneys and inmates at Leavenworth Detention Center. Robinson said she planned to order the U.S. Department of Justice to pay for the investigation, which is expected to cost hundreds of thousands of dollars.

Prosecutors said they obtained the recordings inadvertently while gathering evidence of a prison contraband ring that could involve as many as 95 inmates and 60 non-inmates. A grand jury subpoena resulted in the provision of recordings of meetings between attorneys and clients. Dozens of attorney-client phone call were provided to other lawyers in the case. Robinson said it appeared the rights of some inmates had been violated. The FBOP forbids recording in attorney-client meeting rooms but CoreCivic, which runs the prison, contends that silent video recordings of inmate-attorney meetings “are a standard practice” throughout the country and are used for prison security. In August 2016, Robinson ordered the recordings be stopped. CoreCivic offers prisoners attorneys an option to such recordings be disabled for conferences with their clients but a defense attorney informed the court that calls between himself and a client at Leavenworth had been recorded despite his multiple requests that such recordings end and his receipt of assurances from CoreCivic that the practice had been terminated.

Barry Pollack, president of the National Association of Criminal Defense Lawyers said, "You have a failure on the part of the institution that is recording something that it shouldn't be. Here, they turned it over to the prosecutors." "Anyone facing prison time needs legal counsel, and essentially, they aren't getting it." The illegalities involved caused review of sentencing in cases. One defendant, Michelle Reulet, was released almost three years early after it was learned CCA shared recordings of her meetings with her attorney with the U.S. Prosecutor's office.

=== Fish v. Kobach ===
Robinson presided over Fish v. Kobach (now Fish v. Schwab for Scott Schwab, who succeeded Kobach as the Kansas Secretary of State), the litigation regarding Kansas voter identification laws. In June 2018, she struck down Kansas's law requiring those registering to vote to present proof of citizenship. She also sanctioned Kansas Secretary of State Kris Kobach for violations of the Federal Rules of Civil Evidence during the trial. She ordered him to complete six hours of continuing legal education pertaining to either the Federal Rules of Civil Evidence or Kansas rules of civil evidence. Fish v. Kobach has been described as one of the most important voting rights trials this century.

== See also ==
- List of African-American federal judges
- List of African-American jurists

== Sources ==
Legal offices
Preceded by George Thomas Van Bebber	Judge of the United States District Court for the District of Kansas; 2001–2022	Succeeded by Anthony J. Powell
Preceded by J. Thomas Marten	Chief Judge of the United States District Court for the District of Kansas; 2017–2021	Succeeded by Eric F. Melgren
