= Frank Gordon Theis =

American judge

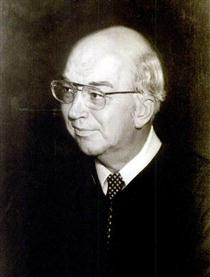

Senior Judge of the United States District Court for the District of Kansas
- In office July 31, 1981 – January 17, 1998

Chief Judge of the United States District Court for the District of Kansas
- In office 1977–1981
- Preceded by: Wesley E. Brown
- Succeeded by: Earl Eugene O'Connor

Judge of the United States District Court for the District of Kansas
- In office March 4, 1967 – July 31, 1981
- Appointed by: Lyndon B. Johnson
- Preceded by: Seat established by 80 Stat. 75
- Succeeded by: Sam A. Crow

Personal details
- Born: Frank Gordon Theis; June 26, 1911 Yale, Kansas
- Died: January 17, 1998 (aged 86)
- Education: University of Kansas (B.A.); University of Michigan Law School (J.D.)

Frank Gordon Theis (June 26, 1911 – January 17, 1998) was a United States district judge of the United States District Court for the District of Kansas.

== Education and career ==
Born in Yale, Kansas, Theis received a Bachelor of Arts degree from the University of Kansas in 1933 and a Juris Doctor from the University of Michigan Law School in 1936. He was in private practice in Arkansas City, Kansas from 1936 to 1937, 1939 to 1950, and 1952 to 1967. He was an attorney for the Kansas Tax Commission from 1937 to 1939. He was deputy county attorney of Cowley County, Kansas from 1942 to 1946. He was chief counsel of the Office of Price Stabilization for Kansas from 1950 to 1952. He was city attorney of Arkansas City from 1955 to 1959.

=== Senate campaign ===
Theis was an unsuccessful Democratic candidate for the Kansas 1960 United States Senate elections.

== Federal judicial service ==
Theis was nominated by President Lyndon B. Johnson on January 16, 1967, to the United States District Court for the District of Kansas, to a new seat created by 80 Stat. 75. He was confirmed by the United States Senate on March 2, 1967, and received his commission on March 4, 1967. He served as Chief Judge from 1977 to 1981. He assumed senior status on July 31, 1981. Theis served in that capacity until his death on January 17, 1998.

== Sources ==
Party political offices
Preceded by George McGill	Democratic nominee for U.S. Senator from Kansas (Class 2); 1960	Succeeded by Paul L. Aylward
Legal offices
Preceded by Seat established by 80 Stat. 75	Judge of the United States District Court for the District of Kansas; 1967–1981	Succeeded by Sam A. Crow
Preceded by Wesley E. Brown	Chief Judge of the United States District Court for the District of Kansas; 1977–1981	Succeeded by Earl Eugene O'Connor
