= Jeffrey M. Kuhlman =

American judge (born 1989)

Jeffrey Marion Kuhlman
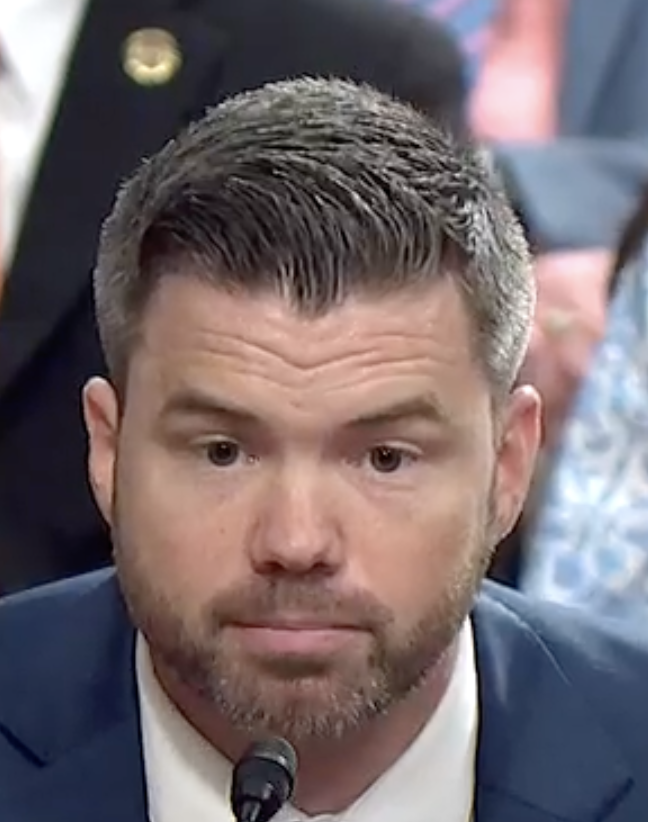

Judge of the United States District Court for the District of Kansas
- Incumbent
- Assumed office June 18, 2026
- Appointed by: Donald Trump
- Preceded by: Eric F. Melgren

Personal details
- Born: Jeffrey Marion Kuhlman; 1989 (age 36–37) Dodge City, Kansas
- Education: Kansas State University (BA); George Mason University (JD)

Jeffrey Marion Kuhlman (born 1989) (known professionally as Jeffrey Kuhlman) is an American lawyer who has served as a United States district judge of the United States District Court for the District of Kansas since 2026.

== Education ==
Kuhlman was born in 1989 in Dodge City, Kansas. He received a Bachelor of Arts degree in 2012 from Kansas State University and a Juris Doctor, cum laude, in 2015 from the Antonin Scalia Law School at George Mason University. From 2015 to 2017, he served as a law clerk for Judge Eric F. Melgren of the United States District Court for the District of Kansas.

== Career ==
From 2017 to 2020, Kuhlman was an associate at the Hinkle Law Firm LLC in Wichita, Kansas. From 2020 to 2026, was as an attorney and shareholder at the law firm of Watkins Calcara, Chtd in Great Bend, Kansas.

=== Federal judicial service ===
On February 18, 2026, President Donald Trump announced his intention to nominate Kuhlman to an undesignated seat on the United States District Court for the District of Kansas. On March 2, 2026, Trump nominated Kuhlman to the seat on the District of Kansas vacated by Judge Eric F. Melgren. On April 15, 2026, the Senate Judiciary Committee held a hearing on his nomination. On May 14, 2026, the Senate Judiciary Committee reported his nomination favorably to the floor of the United States Senate by a 12–10 party-line vote. On June 2, the Senate invoked cloture on his nomination by a 52–46 vote. The same day his nomination was confirmed by a 52–46 vote. He received his judicial commission on June 18, 2026.

== Personal ==
Kuhlman resides in Great Bend, Kansas.

Legal offices
Preceded by Eric F. Melgren	Judge of the United States District Court for the District of Kansas; 2026–present	Incumbent
