= Patrick F. Kelly =

American judge

Senior Judge of the United States District Court for the District of Kansas
- In office June 6, 1995 – March 15, 1996

Chief Judge of the United States District Court for the District of Kansas
- In office 1992–1995
- Preceded by: Earl Eugene O'Connor
- Succeeded by: George Thomas Van Bebber

Judge of the United States District Court for the District of Kansas
- In office May 23, 1980 – June 6, 1995
- Appointed by: Jimmy Carter
- Preceded by: Wesley E. Brown
- Succeeded by: J. Thomas Marten

Personal details
- Born: Patrick F. Kelly; June 25, 1929 Wichita, Kansas, US
- Died: November 16, 2007 (aged 78) Wichita, Kansas, US
- Education: Wichita State University (BA); Washburn University School of Law (LLB)

Patrick F. Kelly (June 25, 1929 – November 16, 2007) was a United States district judge of the United States District Court for the District of Kansas.

== Education and career ==
Born in Wichita, Kansas, Kelly received a Bachelor of Arts degree from Wichita State University in 1951 and a Bachelor of Laws from Washburn University School of Law in 1953. He was in the United States Air Force from 1953 to 1955. He was in private practice in Wichita from 1955 to 1980.

== Federal judicial service ==
On April 14, 1980, Kelly was nominated by President Jimmy Carter to a seat on the United States District Court for the District of Kansas vacated by Judge Wesley E. Brown. Kelly was confirmed by the United States Senate on May 21, 1980, and received his commission on May 23, 1980. He served as Chief Judge from 1992 to 1995, assuming senior status on June 6, 1995. Kelly served in that capacity until his retirement from the bench, on March 15, 1996. He died on November 16, 2007, in Wichita.

== Sources ==
Legal offices
| Preceded by Wesley E. Brown | Judge of the United States District Court for the District of Kansas; 1980–1995 | Succeeded by J. Thomas Marten |
| Preceded by Earl Eugene O'Connor | Chief Judge of the United States District Court for the District of Kansas; 1992–1995 | Succeeded by George Thomas Van Bebber |
