= George Thomas Van Bebber =

American judge (1931–2005)

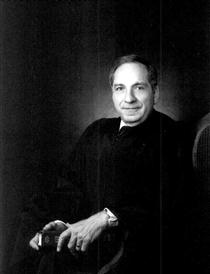

Senior Judge of the United States District Court for the District of Kansas
- In office December 31, 2000 – May 26, 2005

Chief Judge of the United States District Court for the District of Kansas
- In office 1995–2000
- Preceded by: Patrick F. Kelly
- Succeeded by: John Watson Lungstrum

Judge of the United States District Court for the District of Kansas
- In office December 8, 1989 – December 31, 2000
- Appointed by: George H. W. Bush
- Preceded by: Richard Dean Rogers
- Succeeded by: Julie A. Robinson

Magistrate Judge of the United States District Court for the District of Kansas
- In office 1982–1989

Member of the Kansas House of Representatives from the 48th district
- In office 1973–1975
- Succeeded by: Francis Gordon

Personal details
- Born: George Thomas Van Bebber; October 21, 1931 Troy, Kansas
- Died: May 26, 2005 (aged 73) Prairie Village, Kansas
- Party: Republican
- Education: Kansas State University (BA); University of Kansas School of Law (LLB)

George Thomas Van Bebber (October 21, 1931 – May 26, 2005) was a United States district judge of the United States District Court for the District of Kansas.

== Education and career ==
Born in Troy, Kansas, Van Bebber received a Bachelor of Arts degree from the University of Kansas in 1953 and a Bachelor of Laws from the University of Kansas School of Law in 1955. He then entered private practice in Troy until 1959, when he became an assistant United States attorney for the District of Kansas until 1961, thereafter returning to private practice until 1982. During that time, he was County attorney for Doniphan County, Kansas from 1963 to 1969. Van Bebber served in the Kansas House of Representatives from 1973 to 1975 and was a Republican.

== Federal judicial service ==
In 1989, Van Bebber became a United States magistrate judge of the United States District Court for the District of Kansas. On September 13, 1989, he was nominated by President George H. W. Bush to a seat on that court vacated by Richard Dean Rogers. He was confirmed by the United States Senate on November 21, 1989, and received his commission on December 8, 1989. He served as chief judge from 1995 to 2000, and assumed senior status on December 31, 2000. He was succeeded by Julie A. Robinson. He continued to serve in senior status until his death, in Prairie Village, Kansas.

Legal offices
Preceded by Richard Dean Rogers	Judge of the United States District Court for the District of Kansas; 1989–2000	Succeeded by Julie A. Robinson
Preceded by Patrick F. Kelly	Chief Judge of the United States District Court for the District of Kansas; 1995–2000	Succeeded by John Watson Lungstrum
