= J. Thomas Marten =

American judge (born 1951)

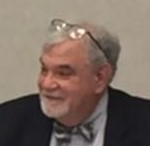

Senior Judge of the United States District Court for the District of Kansas
- In office May 1, 2017 – May 1, 2021

Chief Judge of the United States District Court for the District of Kansas
- In office April 22, 2014 – May 1, 2017
- Preceded by: Kathryn H. Vratil
- Succeeded by: Julie A. Robinson

Judge of the United States District Court for the District of Kansas
- In office January 4, 1996 – May 1, 2017
- Appointed by: Bill Clinton
- Preceded by: Patrick F. Kelly
- Succeeded by: John W. Broomes

Personal details
- Born: John Thomas Marten; November 24, 1951 (age 74) Topeka, Kansas, U.S.
- Education: Washburn University (BA, JD)

John Thomas Marten (born November 24, 1951) is a former United States district judge of the United States District Court for the District of Kansas.

== Education and career ==
Marten was born in Topeka, Kansas. He received a Bachelor of Arts degree from Washburn University in 1973 and a Juris Doctor from Washburn University School of Law in 1976. He was a law clerk to former Associate Justice Tom C. Clark of the Supreme Court of the United States while Clark had senior status and was a visiting judge on several United States Courts of Appeals from 1976 to 1977. He was in private practice in Omaha, Nebraska from 1977 to 1980, then in Minneapolis, Minnesota until 1981, and then in McPherson, Kansas until 1996.

=== Federal judicial service ===
On October 18, 1995, Marten was nominated by President Bill Clinton to a seat on the United States District Court for the District of Kansas vacated by Patrick F. Kelly. Marten was confirmed by the United States Senate on January 2, 1996, and received his commission on January 4, 1996. He served as Chief Judge from April 22, 2014 to May 1, 2017. He assumed senior status on May 1, 2017. He retired from the bench on May 1, 2021.

=== Notable case ===
On August 15, 2013, Judge Marten held that an abortion opponent's letter to a Wichita doctor stating that someone might place an explosive under her car, absent sufficient contextual evidence indicating an imminent threat, is constitutionally protected speech and not a "true threat" under existing law. Judge Marten noted that the government supplied no evidence that actual violence against Dr. Mila Means was likely or imminent, especially since after receiving the letter the doctor changed plans to provide abortion services in Kansas.

== See also ==
- List of law clerks for the tenth seat of the Supreme Court of the United States

== Sources ==
Legal offices
Preceded by Patrick F. Kelly	Judge of the United States District Court for the District of Kansas; 1996–2017	Succeeded by John W. Broomes
Preceded by Kathryn H. Vratil	Chief Judge of the United States District Court for the District of Kansas; 2014–2017	Succeeded by Julie A. Robinson
