= Delmas Carl Hill =

American judge (1906–1989)

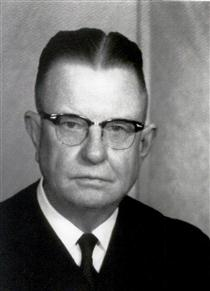

Senior Judge of the United States Court of Appeals for the Tenth Circuit
- In office April 1, 1977 – December 2, 1989

Judge of the United States Court of Appeals for the Tenth Circuit
- In office September 22, 1961 – April 1, 1977
- Appointed by: John F. Kennedy
- Preceded by: Seat established by 75 Stat. 80
- Succeeded by: James Kenneth Logan

Chief Judge of the United States District Court for the District of Kansas
- In office 1957–1961
- Preceded by: Arthur Johnson Mellott
- Succeeded by: Arthur Jehu Stanley Jr.

Judge of the United States District Court for the District of Kansas
- In office October 21, 1949 – September 28, 1961
- Appointed by: Harry S. Truman
- Preceded by: Seat established by 63 Stat. 493
- Succeeded by: Wesley E. Brown

Personal details
- Born: Delmas Carl Hill; October 9, 1906 Wamego, Kansas
- Died: December 2, 1989 (aged 83)
- Education: Washburn University School of Law (LLB)

Delmas Carl Hill (October 9, 1906 – December 2, 1989) was a United States circuit judge of the United States Court of Appeals for the Tenth Circuit and previously was a United States district judge of the United States District Court for the District of Kansas.

== Education and career ==
Born in Wamego, Kansas, Hill received a Bachelor of Laws from Washburn University School of Law in 1929. He was in private practice in Wamego at various times between 1929 and 1943, also serving as the city attorney of Wamego from 1929 to 1934 and from 1937 to 1943, and as county attorney of Pottawatomie County, Kansas from 1931 to 1934. He was the United States Attorney for the District of Kansas from 1934 to 1936. He was general counsel to the Kansas State Tax Commission from 1937 to 1939. He was in the Judge Advocate General's Corps, United States Army during World War II from 1943 to 1946 and became a first lieutenant upon graduation from the Army Judge Advocate Training Center. He was on the military commission for the prosecution of crimes that violated the Laws of War. After military service, he returned to practice in Wamego until 1949.

== Federal judicial service ==
=== District Court service ===
Hill received a recess appointment from President Harry S. Truman on October 21, 1949, to the United States District Court for the District of Kansas, to a new seat authorized by 63 Stat. 493. He was nominated to the same position by President Truman on January 5, 1950. He was confirmed by the United States Senate on March 8, 1950, and received his commission on March 9, 1950. He served as Chief Judge from 1957 to 1961. His service terminated on September 28, 1961, due to elevation to the Tenth Circuit.

=== Court of Appeals service ===
Hill was nominated by President John F. Kennedy on September 14, 1961, to the United States Court of Appeals for the Tenth Circuit, to a new seat authorized by 75 Stat. 80. He was confirmed by the Senate on September 21, 1961, and received his commission on September 22, 1961. He assumed senior status on April 1, 1977. His service terminated on December 2, 1989, due to his death.

== Sources ==
Legal offices
Preceded by Seat established by 63 Stat. 493	Judge of the United States District Court for the District of Kansas; 1950–1961	Succeeded by Wesley E. Brown
Preceded by Arthur Johnson Mellott	Chief Judge of the United States District Court for the District of Kansas; 1957–1961	Succeeded by Arthur Jehu Stanley Jr.
Preceded by Seat established by 75 Stat. 80	Judge of the United States Court of Appeals for the Tenth Circuit; 1961–1977	Succeeded by James Kenneth Logan
