= Arthur Johnson Mellott =

American judge

Chief Judge of the United States District Court for the District of Kansas
- In office 1948–1957
- Preceded by: Office established
- Succeeded by: Delmas Carl Hill

Judge of the United States District Court for the District of Kansas
- In office November 29, 1945 – December 29, 1957
- Appointed by: Harry S. Truman
- Preceded by: Seat established 59 Stat. 545
- Succeeded by: Arthur Jehu Stanley Jr.

Personal details
- Born: Arthur Johnson Mellott; August 30, 1888 Wallula, Kansas
- Died: December 29, 1957 (aged 69)
- Education: Kansas City School of Law (LL.B.)

Arthur Johnson Mellott (August 30, 1888 – December 29, 1957) was a United States district judge of the United States District Court for the District of Kansas.

== Education and career ==
Born in Wallula, (an unincorporated community just south of Lansing), Kansas, Mellott received a Bachelor of Laws from the Kansas City School of Law (now the University of Missouri–Kansas City School of Law) in 1917. He was an Assistant United States Attorney for the District of Kansas from 1917 to 1918, and was in private practice in Kansas City, Kansas from 1919 to 1922. He was a Judge of the City Court of Kansas City from 1923 to 1924, and a county attorney in Kansas City from 1927 to 1929. During the time he was in private practice and during his initial tenure as a judge for the City Court of Kansas City Arthur Mellot also returned to Kansas City School of Law to teach. It is likely that during this time teaching at his alma-mater Mellot first encountered Harry S. Truman. From 1934 to 1935 he was a deputy commissioner of internal revenue in Washington, D.C. He was appointed to the United States Board of Tax Appeals in 1935, serving until 1942 when that body was converted to the United States Tax Court, serving as a Judge of that court until 1945.

== Federal judicial service ==
Mellott was nominated by President Harry S. Truman on November 13, 1945, to the United States District Court for the District of Kansas, to a new seat authorized by 59 Stat. 545. He was confirmed by the United States Senate on November 27, 1945, and received his commission on November 29, 1945. He served as Chief Judge from 1948 to 1957. His service terminated on December 29, 1957, due to his death.

== Sources ==
Legal offices
Preceded by Seat established by 59 Stat. 545	Judge of the United States District Court for the District of Kansas; 1945–1957	Succeeded by Arthur Jehu Stanley Jr.
Preceded by Office established	Chief Judge of the United States District Court for the District of Kansas; 1948–1957	Succeeded by Delmas Carl Hill
