= Wesley E. Brown =

American judge (1907–2012)

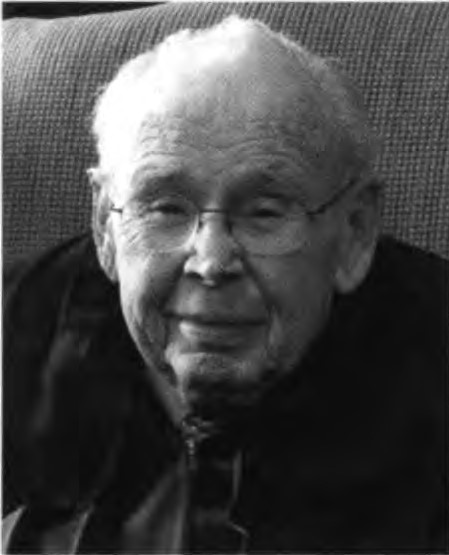

Senior Judge of the United States District Court for the District of Kansas
- In office September 1, 1979 – January 23, 2012

Chief Judge of the United States District Court for the District of Kansas
- In office 1971–1977
- Preceded by: Arthur Jehu Stanley Jr.
- Succeeded by: Frank Gordon Theis

Judge of the United States District Court for the District of Kansas
- In office April 4, 1962 – September 1, 1979
- Appointed by: John F. Kennedy
- Preceded by: Delmas Carl Hill
- Succeeded by: Patrick F. Kelly

Personal details
- Born: Wesley Ernest Brown; June 22, 1907 Hutchinson, Kansas
- Died: January 23, 2012 (aged 104) Wichita, Kansas
- Education: Kansas City School of Law (LLB)

Wesley Ernest Brown (June 22, 1907 – January 23, 2012) was a United States district judge of the United States District Court for the District of Kansas. At his death at age 104, he was the oldest person to serve as a federal judge in the history of the United States, actively hearing cases until approximately one month before his death.

== Education and career ==
Born on June 22, 1907, in Hutchinson, Kansas, to Morrison (Morey) Houston Heady Brown and Julia Elizabeth Wesley Brown, Brown received a Bachelor of Laws in 1933 from the Kansas City School of Law (now the University of Missouri–Kansas City School of Law). He entered private practice in Hutchinson from 1933 to 1944, concurrently serving as county attorney of Reno County, Kansas from 1935 to 1939. He was the secretary of corporation and an attorney for Aircraft Woodwork Manufacturers from 1942 to 1944. He served as a lieutenant in the United States Navy from 1944 to 1946. He returned to private practice in Hutchinson from 1946 to 1958.

== Federal judicial service ==
=== Bankruptcy court service ===
Brown served as a Referee in Bankruptcy for the District of Kansas from 1958 to 1962.

=== District court service ===
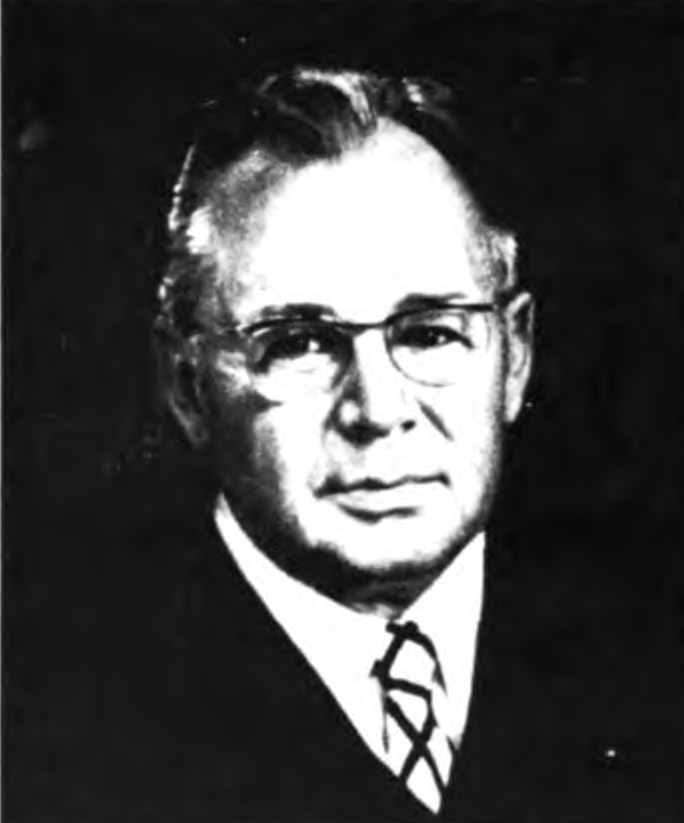
Brown in the 1970s

Brown was nominated by President John F. Kennedy on March 8, 1962, to a seat on the United States District Court for the District of Kansas vacated by Judge Delmas Carl Hill. He was confirmed by the United States Senate on April 2, 1962, and received his commission on April 4, 1962. He served as Chief Judge from 1971 to 1977 and as a member of the Judicial Conference of the United States from 1976 to 1979. He assumed senior status on September 1, 1979. He served as a Judge of the Temporary Emergency Court of Appeals from 1980 to 1993. His service terminated on January 23, 2012, due to his death at an assisted living facility in Wichita, Kansas. Brown had passed Judge Joseph William Woodrough in August 2011 to become the oldest person to serve as a federal judge in the history of the United States, a distinction he retains. He had continued to hear cases until approximately one month prior to his death at the age of 104, though he retired from hearing criminal cases in March 2011.

== Death ==
Brown died at the age of 104 in his sleep in an assisted living facility in Wichita on January 23, 2012. He was survived by 2 children, 4 grand children and 8 great-grandchildren.

== See also ==
- List of United States federal judges by longevity of service

Legal offices
Preceded by Delmas Carl Hill	Judge of the United States District Court for the District of Kansas; 1962–1979	Succeeded by Patrick F. Kelly
Preceded by Arthur Jehu Stanley Jr.	Chief Judge of the United States District Court for the District of Kansas; 1971–1977	Succeeded by Frank Gordon Theis
