= Wilhelm Jacob van Bebber =

German meteorologist (1841–1909)

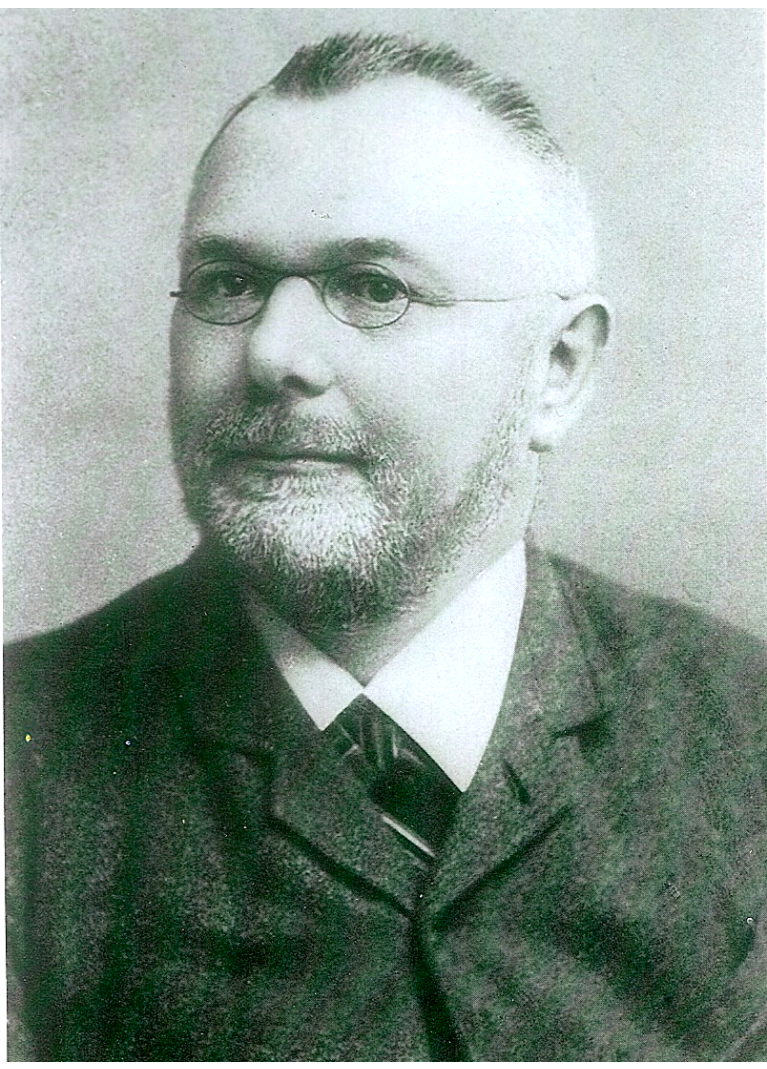
- Born: 14 July 1841; Grieth
- Died: 1 September 1909 (aged 68); Hamburg

Wilhelm Jacob van Bebber (14 July 1841 – 1 September 1909) was a German meteorologist.

Bebber was born in Grieth near Kalkar. He was a member of the Academy of Sciences Leopoldina. Bebber died in Hamburg.
