= Arthur Jehu Stanley Jr. =

American judge

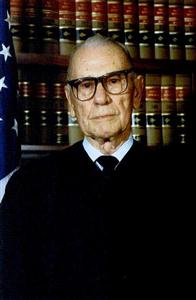

Senior Judge of the United States District Court for the District of Kansas
- In office April 1, 1971 – January 27, 2001

Chief Judge of the United States District Court for the District of Kansas
- In office 1961–1971
- Preceded by: Delmas Carl Hill
- Succeeded by: Wesley E. Brown

Judge of the United States District Court for the District of Kansas
- In office July 7, 1958 – April 1, 1971
- Appointed by: Dwight D. Eisenhower
- Preceded by: Arthur Johnson Mellott
- Succeeded by: Earl Eugene O'Connor

Personal details
- Born: Arthur Jehu Stanley Jr. March 21, 1901 Lincoln County, Kansas
- Died: January 27, 2001 (aged 99) Leavenworth, Kansas
- Education: Kansas City School of Law (LL.B.)

Arthur Jehu Stanley Jr. (March 21, 1901 – January 27, 2001) was a United States district judge of the United States District Court for the District of Kansas.

== Education and career ==
Born in Lincoln County, Kansas, Stanley was a sergeant in the United States Army during World War I, from 1918 to 1919 and a Fireman First Class in the United States Navy from 1921 to 1925. He received a Bachelor of Laws from the Kansas City School of Law (now the University of Missouri–Kansas City School of Law) in 1928, and was in private practice in Kansas City, Kansas from 1928 to 1933, county attorney of Wyandotte County, Kansas from 1934 to 1940, and a member of the Kansas Senate from 1940 to 1941. He was a lieutenant colonel in the United States Army during World War II from 1941 to 1945, returning to private practice in Kansas City, Kansas from 1945 to 1958.

== Federal judicial service ==
Stanley was nominated by President Dwight D. Eisenhower on June 25, 1958, to a seat on the United States District Court for the District of Kansas vacated by Judge Arthur Johnson Mellott. He was confirmed by the United States Senate on July 3, 1958, and received his commission on July 7, 1958. He served as Chief Judge from 1961 to 1971, and as a member of the Judicial Conference of the United States from 1967 to 1970. He assumed senior status on April 1, 1971. His service terminated on January 27, 2001, due to his death in Leavenworth, Kansas.

Legal offices
Preceded by Arthur Johnson Mellott	Judge of the United States District Court for the District of Kansas; 1958–1971	Succeeded by Earl Eugene O'Connor
Preceded by Delmas Carl Hill	Chief Judge of the United States District Court for the District of Kansas; 1961–1971	Succeeded by Wesley E. Brown
