= Yale, Kansas =

Unincorporated community in Crawford County, Kansas

- CDP
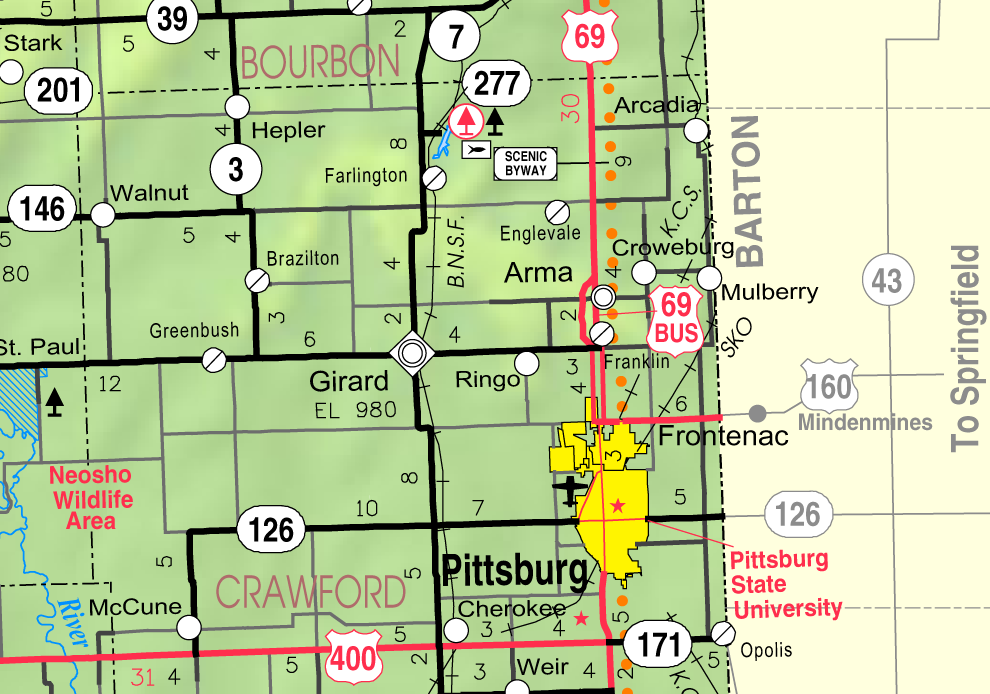
- KDOT map of Crawford County (legend)

- Location within Kansas Location within the United States
- Coordinates: 37°29′24″N 94°38′49″W
- Country: United States
- State: Kansas
- County: Crawford
- Elevation: 958 ft (292 m)

Population (2020)
  - Total: 81
- Time zone: UTC-6 (CST)
  - Summer (DST): UTC-5 (CDT)
- Area code: 620
- FIPS code: 20-80650
- GNIS ID: 2806588

Yale is a census-designated place (CDP) in Crawford County, Kansas, United States. As of the 2020 census, the population was 81. It is located northeast of Frontenac at the intersection of E 600th Ave and S 250th St, approximately one mile west of the Missouri state border. The community is home to the Chicken Mary's and Chicken Annie's restaurants.

== History ==
Yale was a mining town on the Missouri Pacific Railroad. Founded by the Western Coal and Mining Company, Yale served as a primarily African American mining camp from 1890 to 1930. In the 1890s, Yale was involved in the Big Four Strikes in 1893 and 1899. Both strikes resulted in many non-union black miners being brought to the area to work in the mines. Black miners were recruited from Alabama to provide labor during the mining strikes. In 1893, 375 black miners settled in Yale and in 1899, the first importation included 175 black miners. During both strikes, black miners were brought to Yale via the Missouri Pacific Railroad by the Western Coal Mining Company. In 1899, black miners arriving at Yale were shuttled into a stockade to protect them from white striking miners who were not pleased with their arrival. After the second strike ended in September 1899, coal mining companies continued to recruit African American Miners.

By 1900, Yale had grown into a town with a post office, stores, schools, churches, a doctor, and several buildings and homes for the miners and their families. A post office was opened in Yale in 1892, and remained in operation until it was discontinued in 1914. Newly arriving black miners had to live in a skating rink that was converted into a boarding house. In 1900, the "Big Colored* Band from Yale," serenaded president Theodore Roosevelt's arrival in Pittsburg. Additionally, in February and March of that year, there were two mild outbreaks of smallpox.

Due to the black migration, racial violence and anti-black sentiment started to grow in the area that was typical during the American Nadir. A local cemetery, now called the Yale African American Cemetery, is located north of Mindenmines, a sundown town east of Yale, in Barton County, Missouri. It is estimated that 248 individuals are buried in the cemetery. By the early 1930s, most of the African American residents had been forced out of their homes, taking part in the Great Migration, moving north to Kansas City.

== Demographics ==
Historical population
Census	Pop.	Note	%±
2020	81		—
U.S. Decennial Census
