= Richard D. Greene =

Richard D. Greene (died October 7, 2012) was chief judge of the Kansas Court of Appeals. He was appointed to the Court by Governor Sebelius in June 2003, and he was appointed chief by the Kansas Supreme Court in November 2010.

== Biography ==
Richard D. Greene was born in Hermann, Missouri, on January 9, 1950. He received a B.S. in business administration from the University of Missouri in 1972, and a J.D. from Southern Methodist University-Dallas in 1975. Upon graduation he practiced law with the firm Morris, Laing, Evans, Brock & Kennedy for 28 years. Governor Kathleen Sebelius appointed him to the Court of Appeals in June 2003. Greene was appointed chief judge by the Supreme Court effective January 10, 2011.

Judge Greene attended Appellate Judge School in the summer of 2004 at New York University. He has often been appointed to sit with the Kansas Supreme Court, and in that capacity he has authored three published opinions for that court, In re Tax Appeal of Weisberger, 285 Kan. 98 (2007), State v. Alderete, 285 Kan. 359 (2007), and In re Trust D of Darby, 290 Kan. 785.

Judge Greene has been active in the Kansas Bar Association, where he served for 7 years as editor in chief for the Annual Survey of Law. He currently serves as a member of the KBA's Bench-Bar Committee. He has been a lecturer or education panel member for the National Association of Appellate Attorneys, Kansas Women's Attorneys' Association, Johnson County Bar Association, Kansas City Metropolitan Bar Association, Kansas State University, Kansas University School of Law, Pittsburg State University, North Carolina Central Law School, Southwest Kansas Bar Association, Washburn University School of Law, the Wichita Bar Association, the Wyandotte County Bar Association, and the Newton Bar Association. Judge Greene received the Outstanding Service Award from the Kansas Bar Association in 2007 for distinguished service to the profession. He was a member of the National Council of Chief Judges of State Courts of Appeal, and serves as national chairman of its membership committee and on its executive committee.

As Chief of the Court, Judge Greene has implemented a host of initiatives to make the court more tech savvy, more efficient, and more responsive to its legislative mandate to take the court to the people of Kansas. Under his leadership, the court has convened panels in all 31 judicial districts, has achieved the filing of nearly 96% of its opinions within 60 days of hearing, and has enhanced its public and educational outreach to civic clubs, local bar associations, high schools, community colleges, and major universities across the State.

Chief Judge Greene has a long history of community and charitable involvement. He has served as volunteer judge for Youth Entrepreneurs Kansas, and was a member of the emeritus council of Project Concern International where he served as chairman of the board in 1992–94. He was active in his church, where he taught a Sunday adult theology class. He is survived by his wife Mary Sue Smith; his parents Marjorie and Jack Greene; his two daughters Katie Edwards and Jenny Greene; his step-daughters Kristin Smith and Julie Cook; and his four granddaughters, Asheton, Savannah, Chandler, and Madeleine May. He also leaves behind three sisters, Merry Gnaegy, Jonelle Loehnig, and Melodie Kelley, as well as his beloved dog, Lacey.

== Legal career ==
After law school, Judge Greene joined the law firm Morris, Laing, Evans, Brock & Kennedy. He practiced with this firm for 28 years. He was appointed to sit with the Kansas Supreme Court for parts of the 2007–2008 term and he was the presiding judge of the Motions Panel of the Court of Appeals at the time of his death.
