= University of Kansas School of Law =

Public law school in Lawrence, Kansas, US

Coordinates: 38°57′23″N 95°15′15″W

- Parent school: University of Kansas
- Established: 1878
- School type: Public law school
- Dean: Stephen W. Mazza
- Location: Lawrence, Kansas, U.S.
- Enrollment: 311
- Faculty: 80
- USNWR ranking: 50th (tie) (2025)
- Bar pass rate: 96%
- Website: http://www.law.ku.edu/
- ABA profile: ABA Profile

The University of Kansas School of Law is the law school of the University of Kansas, a public research university in Lawrence, Kansas. The University of Kansas Law School was founded in 1893, replacing the earlier Department of Law, which had existed since 1878. The school has more than 60 faculty members and approximately 315 students. The school is accredited by the American Bar Association and is a member of the Association of American Law Schools.

With over 400,000 volumes, the Wheat Law Library at the University of Kansas School of Law is the second largest and oldest law library in the state of Kansas.

== Admissions ==
For the class entering in 2023, the school accepted 48.71% of applicants with 32.84% of accepted applicants enrolling. The class had an average LSAT score of 160 and an average undergraduate GPA of 3.71.

== Centers and programs ==
- Shook, Hardy & Bacon Center for Excellence in Advocacy
- Polsinelli Transactional Law Center
- Tribal Law and Government Center
- Advocacy Skills Certificate
- Business and Commercial Law Certificate
- Environment, Energy and Natural Resources Law Certificate
- International Trade and Finance Certificate
- Media, Law and Technology Certificate
- Tax Law Certificate
- Study Abroad Program

Ten clinical and field placement programs permit students, acting under faculty supervision, to develop legal skills and learn professional values in actual practice settings: Criminal Prosecution Field Placement, Elder Law Field Placement, Judicial Field Placement, Legal Aid Clinic, 6th Semester in Washington, D.C. Externship, Medical-Legal Partnership Field Placement, Paul E. Wilson Project for Innocence and Post-Conviction Remedies, and Tribal Judicial Support Clinic.

== Publications at the University of Kansas School of Law ==
- The Kansas Journal of Law & Public Policy
- The Kansas Law Review
- KU Law Magazine
- Dean's Note
- Hearsay: News from KU's Wheat Law Library

== Curriculum ==
The first-year curriculum includes Civil Procedure, Constitutional Law, Contracts, Criminal Law, Torts, and Property. In addition, students take Lawyering I and II, legal writing classes designed to teach legal research and writing in a context that emphasizes professionalism and practical skills. All first-year students have one of their classes in a small section of approximately 20 students, providing an informal learning atmosphere.

== Employment ==
According to The University of Kansas official 2020 ABA-required disclosures, 72% of the Class of 2019 obtained full-time, long-term, bar passage-required employment 10 months after graduation.

== Costs ==
The total cost of attendance (indicating the cost of tuition, fees, and living expenses) at the University of Kansas for the 2020–2021 academic year was $40,421 for residents of Kansas and $46,456 for residents of other states. 90 percent of students received grants for the 2020–2021 academic year.

== Notable alumni ==
- Michael J. Allen - District Attorney for Colorado's largest District Attorney's office
- Sheila Bair – Former Chairman of the Federal Deposit Insurance Corporation
- Valerie L. Baldwin – Assistant Secretary of the Army (Financial Management and Comptroller) (2004–06)
- Mary Beck Briscoe - Judge of the United States Court of Appeals for the Tenth Circuit
- Sam Brownback – United States Ambassador-at-Large for International Religious Freedom (2018-2021), former Governor of Kansas (2011-2018), former United States Senator for Kansas (1996-2011), former Member of Congress representing Kansas's 2nd congressional district (1995–96), former Secretary of the Kansas Department of Agriculture (1986-1990)(1991-1993), and former White House Fellow under President George H. W. Bush (1990–91).
- Jerry Moran – United States Senator for Kansas and former Member of Congress representing Kansas's 1st congressional district (1997-2011).
- Carol Beier – former Justice of the Kansas Supreme Court
- Chris Biggs – former Kansas Secretary of State
- Eugenia Charles-Newton – Navajo Nation tribal councilor (2019-present)
- Robert Coldsnow, Kansas state legislator
- C. H. Elting, Durant, Oklahoma - Justice of the Oklahoma State Supreme Court (1921-1923), died in office
- Howard Engleman – All-American basketball player at Kansas
- Phillip D. Kline – former attorney (license indefinitely suspended), former Kansas state legislator and Kansas Attorney General, assistant professor Liberty University School of Law
- Lawrence E. Meyers - former Judge of the Texas Court of Criminal Appeals
- Robert H. Miller – Chief Justice of the Kansas Supreme Court (1988-1990)
- Carlos Murguia – former Judge of the United States District Court for the District of Kansas
- Janet Murguia – President and chief executive officer of the National Council of La Raza
- Mary H. Murguia – Chief Judge of the United States Court of Appeals for the Ninth Circuit
- Lawton Nuss – former Chief Justice of the Kansas Supreme Court
- Julie A. Robinson – Chief Judge of the United States District Court for the District of Kansas
- David Stras – Judge of the United States Court of Appeals for the Eighth Circuit
- Derek Schmidt (SJD, 2015), Member of Congress representing Kansas's 2nd congressional district (2025–), former Kansas Attorney General, Republican candidate for Governor in the 2022 Kansas gubernatorial election
- Major General Clyde J. Tate II – Deputy Judge Advocate General of the United States Army
- William H. Towers, state legislator (the only African American in the Kansas legislature during his tenure)
- Larkin Walsh – Justice of the Kansas Supreme Court

== Notable faculty ==
- Christine Arguello, federal judge
- Raj Bhala, author, lawyer, law professor, and University Distinguished Professor
- Stephen McAllister, former U.S. Attorney for District of Kansas, former Kansas Solicitor General
- Elinor Schroeder, Paul E. Wilson Distinguished Professor Emeritus
- Melanie D. Wilson, academic administrator and law professor
