= List of Alpha Phi members =

Following is a list of notable Alpha Phi members.

== Arts and architecture ==
| Name | Chapter | Notability | Ref. |
|---|---|---|---|
| Marisol Deluna | Alpha Lambda (alumna initiate) | Fashion designer | |
| Beverly Willis | Beta Upsilon (Oregon State) | Architect, artist, author, and activist | |

== Business ==
| Name | Chapter | Notability | Ref. |
|---|---|---|---|
| Nancy Austin | Beta Delta (UCLA) | Management consultant and author | |
| Deborah Lippmann | Gamma Pi (Arizona State) | Celebrity manicurist with her own line, the Lippmann Collection | |
| Janet Murguía | Gamma Delta (Kansas) | First female president/CEO of National Council of La Raza | |
| Julee Rosso | Beta Beta (Michigan State) | Founder of the Silver Palate gourmet food shop | |
| Alice Waters | Gamma Beta (UC Santa Barbara) | Chef, founder of Chez Panisse, the original "California Cuisine" restaurant | |

== Entertainment ==
| Name | Chapter | Notability | Ref. |
|---|---|---|---|
| Emily Barkann | Alpha (Syracuse) | Emmy Award-winning journalist and White House correspondent | |
| Lisa Colagrossi | Beta Iota (West Virginia) | Emmy-winning television anchor with WABC-TV in New York | |
| Kaitlan Collins | Beta Mu (Alabama) | Blogger and White House correspondent for CNN | |
| Katelynne Cox | Omicron (Missouri) | Musician, model, congressional aide, news anchor | |
| Rosemarie DeWitt | Theta Mu (Hofstra) | Actress (Standoff, Mad Men, Rachel Getting Married, United States of Tara) | |
| Mildred Dunnock | Zeta (Goucher) | Academy Award-nominated film and stage actress | |
| Taylor Hale | Iota (George Washington University) | Miss Michigan USA 2021, Winner of Big Brother 24 | |
| Jeannette Paulson Hereniko | Tau (Oregon) | American film producer, television writer, film festival director, and founder | |
| Olivia Jordan | Eta (Boston) | Miss USA 2015, 2nd runner-up in Miss Universe 2015 | |
| Kourtney Kardashian | Beta Epsilon (Arizona) | Reality television personality | |
| Ann Martin | Sigma (Washington) | Primetime news anchor and co-host of Woman 2 Woman, KCBS-TV, Los Angeles | |
| Lydia McLaughlin | Eta Rho (University of San Diego) | Television personality and entrepreneur (The Real Housewives of Orange County) | |
| Amy Okuda | Beta Pi (USC) | Actress (Atypical) | |
| Gabrielle Ruiz | Delta Delta (Oklahoma City University) | Actress, dancer, and singer (Crazy Ex-Girlfriend) | |
| Jeri Ryan | Beta (Northwestern) | Actress (Boston Public, Star Trek: Voyager, Dark Skies) | |
| Randi Mayem Singer | Lambda (UC Berkeley | Writer and producer | |
| Inga Swenson | Beta (Northwestern) | Tony Award-nominated actress (The Miracle Worker, Benson) | |
| Jennifer Tisdale | Epsilon Upsilon (CSU Northridge) | Actress (The Hillside Strangler, Dark Ride, Undressed) | |
| Jenn Tran | Iota (UW-Madison) | Reality TV Star | |
| Josie Totah | Eta Upsilon (Chapman) | Actress (Other People, Saved By The Bell) | |
| Kimberly Williams-Paisley | Beta (Northwestern) | Actress (Father of the Bride, According to Jim, We Are Marshall) | |
| Andrea Wong | Zeta Phi (MIT) | Television executive, former president, and chief executive officer of Lifetime Television | |

== Education ==
| Name | Chapter | Notability | Ref. |
|---|---|---|---|
| Martha Foote Crow | Alpha (Syracuse) | Educator and writer | |
| Margaret McNamara | Lambda (UC Berkeley) | Founder of Reading Is Fundamental | |
| Frances Willard | Alpha Lambda (alumna initiate) | Dean of women at Northwestern University, temperance reformer, and women's suffragist | |

== Law ==
| Name | Chapter | Notability | Ref. |
|---|---|---|---|
| Joy Flowers Conti | Epsilon Iota (Duquesne) | District judge for the United States District Court for the Western District of Pennsylvania | |
| Mary H. Murguia | Gamma Delta (Kansas) | United States federal judge | |
| Dorothy Wright Nelson | Beta Delta (UCLA) | United States federal judge | |

== Medicine ==
| Name | Chapter | Notability | Ref. |
|---|---|---|---|
| Edris Rice-Wray Carson | Delta (Cornell) | Pioneer in medical research who helped to prove the worth of the oral contraceptive pill | |

== Politics and government ==
| Name | Chapter | Notability | Ref. |
|---|---|---|---|
| Elaine Baxter | Beta Alpha (Illinois) | Former Iowa secretary of state and former member of the Iowa House of Representatives | |
| Susan Bayh | Lambda (UC Berkeley) | Attorney and former First Lady of Indiana | |
| Nancy Brataas | Epsilon (Minnesota) | First woman Minnesota Senate member elected of her own right | |
| Becky Cain | Beta Iota (West Virginia) | Past president of the League of Women Voters | |
| Kristin Cooper | Phi (Oklahoma) | First Lady of North Carolina from 2017 to 2025 | |
| Georgia Neese Clark Gray | Upsilon (Washburn) | Treasurer of the United States | |
| Pauline Kubala Gubbels | Omega (Texas) | Former New Mexico Legislature member | |
| Shirley McLoughlin | Xi, Beta Theta | First woman to lead a political party in British Columbia | |
| Amanda Nguyen | Iota Tau (Harvard) | Nobel Peace Prize nominee and CEO and founder of Rise | |
| Polly Rosenbaum | Beta Gamma (Colorado) | Arizona's longest-serving state legislator | |
| Emily Anne Staples | Epsilon (Minnesota) | Former Minnesota Senate member | |
| Jodi White | Xi (Toronto) | Canadian politician | |
| Lynn Woolsey | Sigma (Washington) | Member of the United States House of Representatives | |

== Religion ==
| Name | Chapter | Notability | Ref. |
|---|---|---|---|
| Ruth Stafford Peale | Alpha (Syracuse) | Religious leader, public speaker, and author | |
| Catherine Maples Waynick | Epsilon Zeta (Central Michigan) | Bishop of the U.S. Episcopal Church | |

== Sports ==
| Name | Chapter | Notability | Ref. |
|---|---|---|---|
| Kelly Barnhill | Kappa Eta (Florida) | Award-winning collegiate and professional softball player | |
| Susie Berning | Delta Delta (Oklahoma City) | Professional golfer | |
| Julie Clark | Gamma Beta (UC Santa Barbara) | Airline pilot and aerobatic performer | |
| Claire Waters Ferguson | Beta Beta (Michigan State) | First woman president of the United States Figure Skating Association | |
| Stacia Hookom | Beta Gamma (Colorado) | First woman on U.S. Snowboarding team, multiple national/world titles | |
| Edean Anderson Ihlanfeldt | Beta Upsilon (Oregon State) | Golfer, champion of multiple national titles for the US and Canada | |
| Jennifer Joines | Iota Gamma (University of the Pacific) | Silver medal-winning indoor volleyball player, 2008 Beijing Olympics | |
| Janis Klecker | Epsilon (Minnesota) | Long-distance runner, two-time U.S. national champion in the marathon | |
| Marion Roper | Beta Delta (UCLA) | Bronze medal-winning diver in the 1932 Summer Olympics | |

== Writing and journalism ==
| Name | Chapter | Notability | Ref. |
|---|---|---|---|
| Liz Carpenter | Omega (Texas) | Author, political humorist, and former press secretary for Lady Bird Johnson | |
| Taylor Lorenz | Beta Gamma (Colorado) | Columnist for The Washington Post | |
| Nan C. Robertson | Beta (Northwestern) | Pulitzer Prize-winning reporter and feature writer for The New York Times | |
| Barbara Brooks Wallace | Beta Delta (UCLA) | Award-winning children's author | |
| Kaitlan Collins | Beta Mu (University of Alabama) | Journalist & Television Anchor for CNN | |
| Janice Woods Windle | Omega (Texas) | Author of True Women | |

== See also ==
- List of Alpha Phi chapters
- List of Alpha Phi alumnae chapters
