= Judge Murguia =

Judge Murguia may refer to:

- Carlos Murguia (born 1957), judge of the United States District Court for the District of Kansas
- Mary H. Murguia (born 1960), judge of the United States Court of Appeals for the Ninth Circuit
