= List of Alpha Phi alumnae chapters =

Alpha Phi sorority was established in 1872 as a collegiate women's fraternity. In the following list of chapters, active chapters are indicated in bold and inactive chapters are in italics.

Chapter	Charter date and range	City or county	State, province, or country	Status	Ref.
**Akron-Canton Alumnae Chapter**		Akron	Ohio	Active	
**Albuquerque Alumnae Chapter**		Albuquerque	New Mexico	Active	
**Alpha Phi of Hawaii Alumnae Chapter**		Honolulu	Hawaii	Active	
**Amarillo Alumnae Chapter**		Amarillo	Texas	Active	
**Arctic Lily Alumnae Chapter**			Alaska	Active	
**Arkansas Alpha Phi Alumnae Chapter**			Arkansas	Active	
**Ashland Area Alumnae Chapter**		Ashland	Ohio	Active	
**Atlanta Alumnae Chapter**		Atlanta	Georgia	Active	
**Austin Alumnae Chapter**		Austin	Texas	Active	
**Baton Rouge Traditional Alumnae Chapter**		Baton Rouge	Louisiana	Active	
Birmingham Alumnae Chapter	1968–1991	Birmingham	Alabama	Consolidated	
**Birmingham and Tuscaloosa Alumnae Chapter**	1991	Birmingham and Tuscaloosa	Alabama	Active	
**Boise Alumnae Chapter**		Boise	Idaho	Active	
**Boston Alumnae Chapter**	1889	Boston	Massachusetts	Active	
**British Columbia Alumnae Chapter**			British Columbia	Active	
**Cape Fear Alumnae Chapter**	April 2006	Wilmington	North Carolina	Active	
**Central Florida Alpha Phi Alumnae Chapter**			Florida	Active	
**Central Iowa Alumnae Chapter**			Iowa	Active	
**Central Missouri Alumnae Chapter**			Missouri	Active	
**Central New Jersey Alumnae Chapter**			New Jersey	Active	
**Central New York and Alpha Chapter Alumnae Community**			New York	Active	
**Central Pennsylvania Alumnae Chapter**			Pennsylvania	Active	
**Champaign County Alumnae Chapter**		Champaign County	Illinois	Active	
**Charlotte Alumnae Chapter**		Charlotte	North Carolina	Active	
Chicago Alumnae	1889	Chicago	Illinois	Inactive	
**Chicago Lake Shore Alumnae Chapter**		Chicago	Illinois	Active	
**Chicago NW Suburban Alumnae Chapter**		Chicago	Illinois	Active	
**Chicago Western Villages Alumnae Chapter**		Chicago	Illinois	Active	
**Cincinnati Alumnae Chapter**		Cincinnati	Ohio	Active	
**Clarksville Alumnae Chapter**		Clarksville	Tennessee	Active	
**Cleveland East Alumnae Chapter**		Cleveland	Ohio	Active	
**Cleveland West Alumnae Chapter**		Cleveland	Ohio	Active	
**Coachella Valley Alumnae Chapter**		Coachella Valley	California	Active	
**Coeur d’Alene Alumnae/Kootenai County Alumnae Chapter**		Coeur d’Alene	Idaho	Active	
**Columbia at Large Alumnae Chapter**		Columbia	Missouri	Active	
**Columbus Alumnae Chapter**		Columbus	Ohio	Active	
**Crescent Bay Alumnae Chapter**			California	Active	
**Dallas and Suburban Alumnae Chapter**		Dallas	Texas	Active	
**Dayton Alumnae Chapter**		Dayton	Ohio	Active	
**Daytona Beach Area Alumnae Chapter**		Daytona Beach	Florida	Active	
**DC Metro Ivy Connection**		Washington, D.C.	District of Columbia	Active	
**Denton County Alumnae Chapter**		Denton County	Texas	Active	
**Denver Alumnae Chapter**		Denver	Colorado	Active	
**Detroit West Alumnae Chapter**		Detroit	Michigan	Active	
**Door County Alumnae Chapter**		Door County	Wisconsin	Active	
**DuPage Valley Alumnae Chapter**		DuPage County	Illinois	Active	
**East Bay Alumnae Chapter**		East Bay	California	Active	
**Eastern Iowa Alumnae Chapter**			Iowa	Active	
**Emerald Coast Alumnae Chapter**		Emerald Coast	Florida	Active	
**England Alumnae Chapter**			United Kingdom	Active	
**Evansville/Tri-State Area Alumnae Chapter**		Evansville	Indiana	Active	
**Fairfield County Alumnae Chapter**		Fairfield	Connecticut	Active	
**Far North Dallas and Surrounding Counties Alumnae**		North Dallas	Texas	Active	
**Fort Worth Alumnae Chapter**		Fort Worth	Texas	Active	
**Golden Gate Alumnae Chapter**		San Francisco	California	Active	
**Grand Forks Alumnae Chapter**		Grand Forks	North Dakota	Active	
**Greater Fresno Alumnae Chapter**		Fresno	California	Active	
**Greater Kansas City Alumnae Chapter**		Kansas City	Kansas	Active	
**Greater Lawton Alumnae Chapter**		Lawton	Oklahoma	Active	
**Greater Lynchburg Alumnae Chapter**		Lynchburg	Virginia	Active	
**Greater Naples Alumnae Chapter**		Naples	Florida	Active	
**Greater Peoria Alumnae Chapter of Alpha Phi**		Peoria	Illinois	Active	
**Greater Philadelphia Alumnae Chapter**		Philadelphia	Pennsylvania	Active	
**Greater Puget Sound Alumnae Chapter**		Puget Sound	Washington	Active	
**Greater Sacramento Alumnae Chapter**		Sacramento	California	Active	
**Greater Seattle Alumnae Chapter**		Seattle	Washington	Active	
**Greater Tulsa Alumnae Chapter**		Tulsa	Oklahoma	Active	
**Greater West Michigan Alumnae Chapter**			Michigan	Active	
**Greenville Area Alumnae Chapter**		Greenville	North Carolina	Active	
**Hampton Roads Alumnae Chapter**		Hampton Roads	Virginia	Active	
**Holland/Grand Haven Alumnae Chapter**		Holland	Michigan	Active	
**Houston Alumnae Chapter**		Houston	Texas	Active	
**Indianapolis Alumnae Chapter**		Indianapolis	Indiana	Active	
**Inland Empire Alumnae Chapter**		Yucaipa	California	Active	
**Jacksonville First Coast Alumnae Chapter**	1990	Jacksonville	Florida	Active	
**Kalamazoo Alumnae Chapter**		Kalamazoo	Michigan	Active	
**Kansas City Missouri Metropolitan Alumnae Chapter**		Kansas City	Missouri	Active	
**Kearney Alumnae Chapter**		Kearney	Nebraska	Active	
**Kentuckiana Alumnae Chapter**			Indiana	Active	
**Lake County Alumnae Chapter**		Lake County	Illinois	Active	
**Lake Ray Hubbard Alumnae Chapter**			Texas	Active	
**Lansing Area Alumnae Chapter**		Lansing	Michigan	Active	
**Las Vegas Alumnae Chapter**		Las Vegas	Nevada	Active	
**Lexington Alumnae Chapter**		Lexington	Kentucky	Active	
**Lincoln Alumnae Chapter**		Lincoln	Nebraska	Active	
**Long Beach Alumnae Chapter**		Long Beach	California	Active	
**Los Angeles Alumnae Chapter**		Los Angeles	California	Active	
**Louisville Metro Traditional Alumnae Chapter**		Louisville	Kentucky	Active	
**Lowcountry Alumnae Chapter**			South Carolina	Active	
**Lubbock Alumnae Chapter**		Lubbock	Texas	Active	
**Madison Alumnae Chapter**		Madison	Wisconsin	Active	
**Manitoba Alumnae Chapter**		Winnipeg	Manitoba	Active	
**Memphis Alumnae Chapter**		Memphis	Tennessee	Active	
**Metro East St. Louis Alumnae**		East St. Louis	Illinois	Active	
**MetroWest MA Alumnae Chapter**		MetroWest	Massachusetts	Active	
**Miami Alumnae Chapter**	March 2011	Miami	Florida	Active	
**Michiana Alumnae Chapter**		Michiana	Indiana	Active	
**Milwaukee Alumnae Chapter**		Milwaukee	Wisconsin	Active	
**Minneapolis/St. Paul Alumnae Chapter**		Minneapolis and Saint Paul	Minnesota	Active	
**Missoula Alumnae Chapter**		Missoula	Missouri	Active	
**Monterey Bay Alumnae**			California	Active	
**Montreal and Eastern Townships Alumnae Chapter**		Montreal	Quebec	Active	
**Morgantown Alumnae Chapter**		Morgantown	West Virginia	Active	
**Moscow Alumnae Chapter**		Moscow	Idaho	Active	
**Muncie Alumnae Chapter**		Muncie	Indiana	Active	
**Nashville Alumnae Chapter**		Nashville	Tennessee	Active	
**NYC Metro Alumnae Chapter**		New York City	New York	Active	
**Norman Alpha Phi Alumnae Chapter**		Norman	Oklahoma	Active	
**North Orange County Alumnae**		Orange County	California	Active	
**North Tarrant County Alumnae Chapter**		Tarrant County	Texas	Active	
**Northern Virginia Alumnae Chapter**			Virginia	Active	
**Northwest Houston Alumnae Chapter**		Houston	Texas	Active	
**Oklahoma City Alumnae Chapter**		Oklahoma City	Oklahoma	Active	
**Oklahoma City Ivy Connection**		Oklahoma City	Oklahoma	Active	
**Omaha Alumnae Chapter**		Omaha	Nebraska	Active	
**Orange County Alumnae Chapter**		Orange County	California	Active	
**Ottawa-Gatineau Alumnae Chapter**		Ottawa	Ontario	Active	
**Palm Beach & Treasure Coast Alumnae Chapter**		Palm Beach	Florida	Active	
**Pasadena Alumnae Chapter**		Pasadena	California	Active	
**Phoenix Alumnae Chapter**		Phoenix	Arizona	Active	
**Pikes Peak Alumnae Chapter**		Pikes Peak	Colorado	Active	
**Placer Alumnae Chapter**		Placer County	California	Active	
**Portland, ME Alumnae Chapter**		Portland	Maine	Active	
**Portland, OR Alumnae Chapter**		Portland	Oregon	Active	
**Quebec Alumnae Chapter**			Quebec	Active	
**Raleigh Durham Triangle Alumnae Chapter**		Raleigh, Durham, and Chapel Hill	North Carolina	Active	
**Reno Alpha Phi Alumnae Chapter**		Reno	Nevada	Active	
**Richmond Central Virginia Alumnae Chapter**		Richmond	Virginia	Active	
**Rockford Alumnae Chapter**		Rockford	Illinois	Active	
**St. Louis Gateway Alumnae Chapter**		St. Louis	Missouri	Active	
St. Petersburg - Clearwater Alumanae Chapter	December 5, 1957 – 1998	St. Petersburg	Florida	Consolidated	(Note: The St. Petersburg - Clearwater chapter and the Tampa chapter merged to form the Tampa Bay chapter in 1998.)
**Saddleback Valley Alumnae Chapter**		Saddleback Valley	California	Active	
**Salt Lake Alumnae Chapter**		Salt Lake City	Utah	Active	
**San Antonio Alumnae Chapter**		San Antonio	Texas	Active	
**San Diego Alumnae Chapter**		San Diego	California	Active	
**San Fernando Valley Alumnae Chapter**		San Fernando Valley	California	Active	
**San Joaquin County Alumnae Chapter**		San Joaquin County	California	Active	
**San Mateo Alumnae Chapter**		San Mateo	California	Active	
**Sandhills Alumnae Chapter**			North Carolina	Active	
**Sanford Traditional Alumnae Chapter**		Sanford	Florida	Active	
**Santa Barbara Alumnae Chapter**		Santa Barbara	California	Active	
**Shreveport/Bossier Alumnae Chapter**		Shreveport	Louisiana	Active	
**Silicon Valley Alumnae Chapter**			California	Active	
**Sioux Falls Alumnae Chapter**		Sioux Falls	South Dakota	Active	
**South Bay Alumnae of Alpha Phi**			California	Active	
**Southeast Florida/Greater Ft. Lauderdale Alumnae**	1955	Broward County	Florida	Active	
**Southeastern Louisiana Alumnae Chapter**			Louisiana	Active	
**Southern New Jersey Alumnae Chapter**			New Jersey	Active	
**Southwest Dallas Alumnae Chapter**		Dallas	Texas	Active	
**Southwestern Ontario Alumnae Chapter**	2011	London	Ontario	Active	
**Spokane Alumnae Chapter**		Spokane	Washington	Active	
**State College Alumnae Chapter**		State College	Pennsylvania	Active	
**Stevens Point Alumnae Chapter**		Stevens Point	Wisconsin	Active	
**Tacoma Alumnae Chapter**		Tacoma	Washington	Active	
**Tallahassee Alumnae Chapter**		Tallahassee	Florida	Active	
Tampa Alumnae Chapter	19xx ?–1998	Tampa	Florida	Consolidated	
**Tampa Bay Alumnae Chapter**			Florida	Active	(Note: The chapter consists of the St. Petersburg Alumnae Panhellenic, the Clearwater Alumnae Panhellenic, and the Tampa Alumnae Panhellenic.)
**TCU – Zeta Nu Alumnae Community**			Texas	Active	
**Tempe (Gamma Pi) Alumnae Chapter**		Tempe	Arizona	Active	
**Terre Haute Alumnae Chapter**			Indiana	Active	
**Texas – Montgomery County Alumnae Chapter**		Montgomery County	Texas	Active	
**Toledo Traditional Alumnae Chapter**		Toledo	Ohio	Active	
**Topeka Alumnae Chapter**		Topeka	Kansas	Active	
**Toronto and Area Alumnae Chapter**		Toronto	Ontario	Active	
**Tri County Alumnae Chapter**			Texas	Active	
**Tucson Alumnae Chapter**		Tucson	Arizona	Active	
Tuscaloosa Alumnae Chapter	19xx ?–1991	Tuscaloosa	Alabama	Consolidated	
**Upstate South Carolina Alumnae Chapter**			South Carolina	Active	
**Vancouver Alumnae Chapter**		Vancouver	British Columbia	Active	
**Walla Walla Alumnae Chapter**		Walla Walla	Washington	Active	
**Wichita Alumnae Chapter**		Wichita	Kansas	Active	
**Wichita Falls Alumnae Chapter**		Wichita Falls	Texas	Active	
**Youngstown Alumnae Chapter**		Youngstown	Ohio	Active	

== See also ==
- List of Alpha Phi members
- List of Alpha Phi chapters
