= Sidney R. Thomas =

American judge (born 1953)

Sidney Thomas
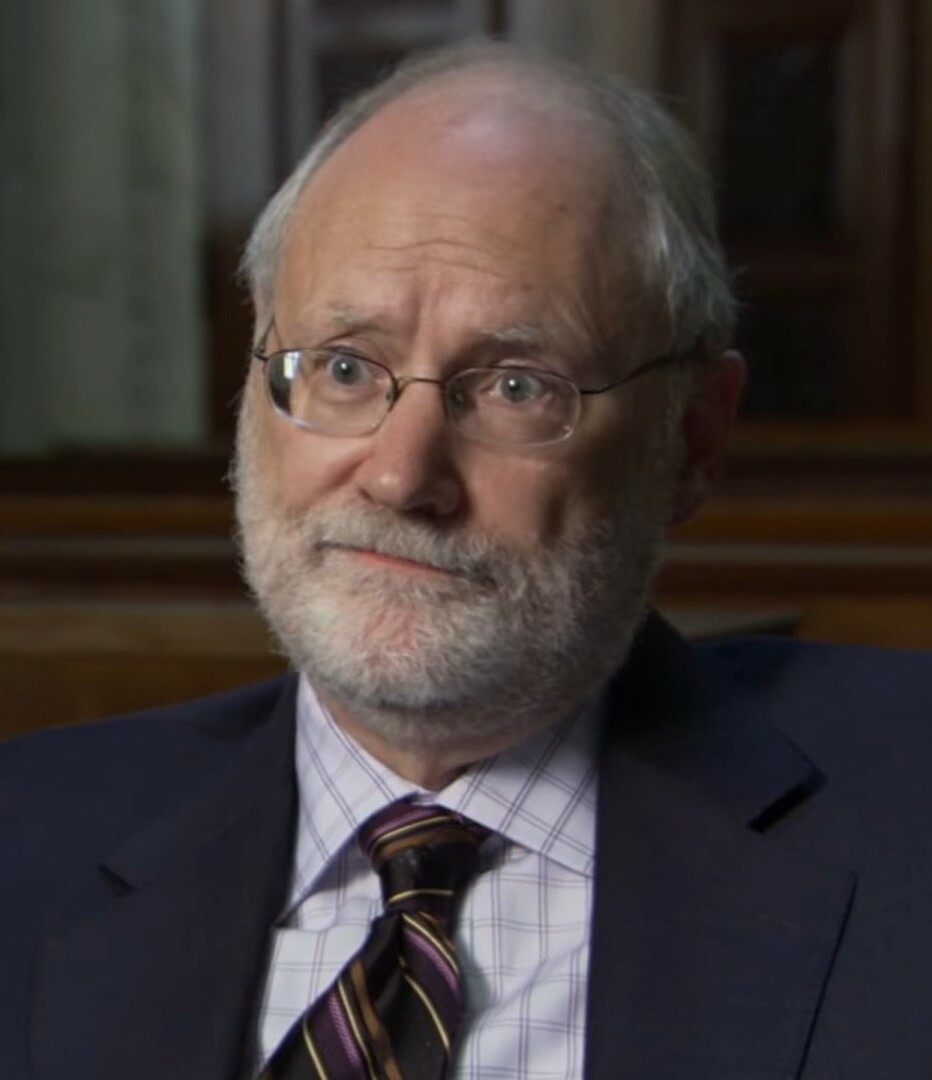
- Thomas in 2010

Senior Judge of the United States Court of Appeals for the Ninth Circuit
- Incumbent
- Assumed office May 4, 2023

Chief Judge of the United States Court of Appeals for the Ninth Circuit
- In office December 1, 2014 – December 1, 2021
- Preceded by: Alex Kozinski
- Succeeded by: Mary H. Murguia

Judge of the United States Court of Appeals for the Ninth Circuit
- In office January 4, 1996 – May 4, 2023
- Appointed by: Bill Clinton
- Preceded by: Dorothy Wright Nelson
- Succeeded by: Anthony Johnstone

Personal details
- Born: Sidney Runyan Thomas; August 14, 1953 (age 72); Bozeman, Montana, U.S.
- Political party: Democratic
- Education: Montana State University (BA); University of Montana (JD)

Sidney Runyan Thomas (born August 14, 1953) is an American lawyer and jurist serving as a senior U.S. circuit judge of the United States Court of Appeals for the Ninth Circuit since 1996. He served as the Ninth Circuit's chief judge from 2014 to 2021. His chambers are located in Billings, Montana.

== Early life and education ==
Thomas was born in Bozeman, Montana. He received his Bachelor of Arts degree from Montana State University in 1975 and his Juris Doctor with honors from the University of Montana School of Law in 1978. He was appointed as a student member of the state Board of Regents of Higher Education in 1974 and reappointed in 1976.

== Professional career ==
After graduating from law school, Thomas entered private practice at Moulton, Bellingham, Longo & Mather, a law firm in Billings, Montana. He became a senior partner there, where he specialized in commercial litigation as well as government, bankruptcy and media law.

Thomas also served as the standing bankruptcy trustee for all bankruptcy cases filed in the Billings Division of the United States District Court for the District of Montana from 1978 to 1981 and served as an adjunct instructor in law at Rocky Mountain College from 1982 to 1995.

== Federal judicial service ==
On July 19, 1995, President Bill Clinton nominated Thomas to a seat on the United States Court of Appeals for the Ninth Circuit vacated by Judge Dorothy Wright Nelson. His nomination had been briefly held up by U.S. Senator Conrad Burns of Montana, who wanted the nominations of Thomas and A. Wallace Tashima delayed until the passage of a bill to split the Ninth Circuit into two circuits. The United States Senate confirmed Thomas on January 2, 1996 by a voice vote. He received his commission on January 4, 1996. He served as Chief Judge from December 1, 2014 to December 1, 2021. On March 29, 2022, he announced his intent to assume senior status upon confirmation of a successor. He assumed senior status on May 4, 2023.

=== En banc coordinator ===
Judge Thomas is the en banc coordinator for the Ninth Circuit, whose parliamentarian-type duties can affect the outcome of any case. "I've never known one of his rulings to be challenged," the Ninth Circuit's Chief Judge, Alex Kozinski, stated in 2010. "I think it's a tribute to his evenhandedness that he's been on the job for many years, and nobody wants a different en banc coordinator."

== Supreme Court consideration ==
Senior White House officials listed Thomas among the approximately 10 individuals who were considered to replace retiring United States Supreme Court Associate Justice John Paul Stevens.

On April 29, 2010, President Barack Obama and Vice President Joe Biden both separately interviewed Thomas at the White House. Obama eventually nominated Solicitor General Elena Kagan, who was confirmed.

== Notable rulings ==
Thomas authored the opinion in Nadarajah v. Gonzales, a civil rights case in 2006 on a suspected Tamil Tiger immigrant.

Thomas was in the majority in Peruta v. San Diego, a 2016 ordinance that ruled that San Diego's restrictive gun policy was constitutional.

On June 26, 2020, Thomas ruled in favor of the Sierra Club, holding that the Department of Defense's decision to use $2.5 billion in Pentagon funds to fund the border wall violates the Appropriations Clause. On July 31, the ruling was effectively reversed in a 5–4 decision by the U.S. Supreme Court.

On May 13, 2021, Thomas ruled that an immigrant who arrived in the United States as a child does not need to have lawful permanent residency in order to derive citizenship from a parent who naturalized.

== Personal ==
Thomas is married to Martha Sheehy, a Billings attorney who has practiced law since 1988.

== See also ==
- Barack Obama Supreme Court candidates
- MGM Studios, Inc. v. Grokster, Ltd.

Legal offices
Preceded by Dorothy Wright Nelson	Judge of the United States Court of Appeals for the Ninth Circuit; 1996–2023	Succeeded by Anthony Johnstone
Preceded by Alex Kozinski	Chief Judge of the United States Court of Appeals for the Ninth Circuit; 2014–2021	Succeeded by Mary H. Murguia
