= Anthony Johnstone =

American judge (born 1973)

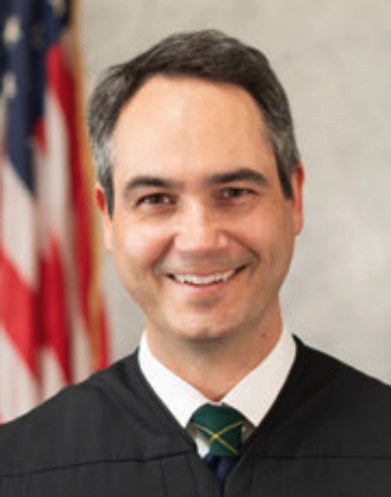

Judge of the United States Court of Appeals for the Ninth Circuit
- Incumbent
- Assumed office May 5, 2023
- Appointed by: Joe Biden
- Preceded by: Sidney R. Thomas

Personal details
- Born: Anthony Cameron Johnstone; 1973 (age 52–53) Minneapolis, Minnesota, U.S.
- Education: Yale University (BA); University of Chicago (JD)

Anthony Devos Johnstone (né Anthony Cameron Johnstone; (Note: Prior to his marriage in 2004.) born 1973) is an American lawyer who serves as a United States circuit judge of the United States Court of Appeals for the Ninth Circuit.

== Early life and education ==
Johnstone earned a Bachelor of Arts degree from Yale University in 1995. He was a paralegal at the law firm Arnold & Porter from 1995 to 1996. He then attended the University of Chicago Law School, graduating in 1999 with a Juris Doctor with honors. He married Autumn Helene Devos in 2004.

== Career ==
In 1999 and 2000, Johnstone served as a law clerk for Judge Sidney R. Thomas of the United States Court of Appeals for the Ninth Circuit. From 2000 to 2003, he was a litigation associate at Cravath, Swaine & Moore in New York City. From 2004 to 2008, he served as an assistant attorney general in the Montana Department of Justice. From 2008 to 2011, he served as Solicitor General of Montana. From 2011 to 2023, he worked as a professor at the Alexander Blewett III School of Law. He was a solo practitioner at Johnstone PLLC in Missoula, Montana. Johnstone has been a member of the Federalist Society and the American Constitution Society.

In 2008, Johnstone represented the state of Montana in a case against Canyon Ferry Road Baptist Church. The church, located in East Helena, Montana, believed that marriage may exist only between one man and one woman. The church challenged certain provisions of Montana's campaign finance law requiring reporting and disclosure of campaign contributions or expenditures.

=== Federal judicial service ===
On September 2, 2022, President Joe Biden announced his intent to nominate Johnstone to serve as a United States circuit judge for the United States Court of Appeals for the Ninth Circuit. On September 6, 2022, his nomination was sent to the Senate. President Biden nominated Johnstone to the seat to be vacated by Judge Sidney R. Thomas, who announced his intent to assume senior status upon confirmation of a successor. Senator Steve Daines of Montana opposed his nomination, saying that Johnstone was too political and partisan to be a judge and that the White House had not adequately consulted him on the nomination. On October 12, 2022, a hearing on his nomination was held before the Senate Judiciary Committee. He was questioned about his views on election integrity and religious freedom issues. On December 1, 2022, his nomination was favorably reported by the committee by an 11–10 vote. On January 3, 2023, his nomination was returned to the President under Rule XXXI, Paragraph 6 of the United States Senate; he was renominated later the same day. On February 2, 2023, the committee failed to report his nomination by a 10–10 vote. On February 9, 2023, his nomination was favorably reported by the committee by an 11–10 vote. On April 25, 2023, Majority Leader Chuck Schumer filed cloture on his nomination. On April 27, 2023, the Senate invoked cloture on his nomination by a 50–45 vote. On May 1, 2023, his nomination was confirmed by a 49–45 vote. He received his judicial commission on May 5, 2023.

== Publications ==
=== Articles ===
- Johnstone, Anthony (December 11, 2013). "Outside Influence". Election Law Journal. 13: 117. doi:10.1089/elj.2013.0210. SSRN 2379171.
- Johnstone, Anthony (July 18, 2013). "The System of Campaign Finance Disclosure". Iowa Law Review Bulletin. 99. SSRN 2295545.
- Johnstone, Anthony (December 3, 2013). "Recalibrating Campaign Finance Law". Yale Law & Policy Review. 32: 217. SSRN 2394937.
- Johnstone, Anthony (March 25, 2013). "Commandeering Information (and Informing the Commandeered)". University of Pennsylvania Law Review Online. 161: 205. SSRN 2244191.
- Johnstone, Anthony (October 31, 2011). "A Madisonian Case for Disclosure". George Mason Law Review. 19 (2). SSRN 1967196.
- Johnstone, Anthony (June 1, 2010). "The Constitutional Initiative in Montana". Montana Law Review. 71: 325. SSRN 1623249.
- Johnstone, Anthony (August 1, 2009). "Captive Regulators, Captive Shippers: The Legacy of Mccarty Farms". Montana Law Review. 70: 239. SSRN 1604922.
- Johnstone, Anthony (April 1, 1998). "Peremptory Pragmatism: Religion and the Administration of the Batson Rule". University of Chicago Legal Forum: 441. SSRN 1604909.

=== Forewords ===
- Johnstone, Anthony (March 5, 2013). "Foreword: The State of the Republican Form of Government in Montana". Montana Law Review. 74: 5. SSRN 2229543.

=== Testimony ===
- Johnstone, Anthony (September 12, 2012). "Testimony of Anthony Johnstone, Assistant Professor, University of Montana School of Law - Senate Judiciary Committee Hearing on 'The Citizens United Court and the Continuing Importance of the Voting Rights Act'". SSRN 2226393.

== See also ==
- Joe Biden judicial appointment controversies

== Notes ==
Legal offices
Preceded by Sidney R. Thomas	Judge of the United States Court of Appeals for the Ninth Circuit; 2023–present	Incumbent
