= Carlos Murguia =

American judge

Judge of the United States District Court for the District of Kansas
- In office September 22, 1999 – April 1, 2020
- Appointed by: Bill Clinton
- Preceded by: Sam A. Crow
- Succeeded by: Toby Crouse

Personal details
- Born: September 21, 1957 (age 68) Kansas City, Kansas, U.S.
- Relatives: Mary H. Murguia; Janet Murguía
- Education: University of Kansas (BS, JD)

Carlos Murguia (born September 21, 1957) is a former United States district judge of the United States District Court for the District of Kansas.

== Early life and education ==
Murguia is one of seven children of Alfred and Amalia Murguia, who emigrated from Mexico in 1950. He was born in 1957 in Kansas City, Kansas. Murguia was raised in the Kansas City community of Argentine. Murguia received a Bachelor of Science degree from the University of Kansas in 1979, where he majored in journalism. He then earned a Juris Doctor from the University of Kansas School of Law in 1982.

== Career ==
Murguia was in private practice in Kansas City from 1982 to 1987. He was a part-time hearing officer and small claims judge of the District Court of Wyandotte County, Kansas from 1984 to 1990. He was a coordinator of the Immigration Amnesty Program at El Centro, Inc. from 1985 to 1990. He was a full-time hearing officer of the Wyandotte County District Court in 1990, and District Court Judge of Division 8 on the Court from 1990 to 1999.

== Federal judicial service ==
Murguia was nominated by President Bill Clinton on March 24, 1999, to the seat on the United States District Court for the District of Kansas vacated by Sam A. Crow. He was confirmed by the United States Senate on September 8, 1999, and received his commission on September 22, 1999. Murguia is the first Latino to serve as a federal judge in Kansas.

=== Misconduct ===
On September 30, 2019, the Judicial Council of the 10th Circuit Court of Appeals identified and unanimously adopted a complaint of judicial misconduct under the Judicial Conduct and Disability Act against Judge Murguia. The Council adopted the Special Committee's conclusions that Judge Murguia committed judicial misconduct by (1) sexually harassing judiciary employees; (2) engaging in an extramarital sexual relationship with an individual who had been convicted of felonies in state court and was then on probation; and (3) demonstrating habitual tardiness for court engagements.

=== Resignation ===
Acknowledging his transgressions referenced above, on February 18, 2020, Murguia submitted his letter of resignation to President Donald Trump, which took effect April 1, 2020.

== Personal ==
When Murguia's younger sister, Mary H. Murguia, joined the United States District Court for the District of Arizona, they became the first brother and sister to serve on the United States federal bench. Mary Murguia has since been elevated to the United States Court of Appeals for the Ninth Circuit. Another sister, Janet Murguía, is a noted civil rights leader who currently serves as President and Chief Executive Officer of the National Council of La Raza. Murguia was married to Ann Brandau-Murguia, former Wyandotte County Commissioner.

== See also ==
- List of Hispanic and Latino American jurists
- List of first minority male lawyers and judges in Kansas

== Sources ==
Legal offices
Preceded by Sam A. Crow	Judge of the United States District Court for the District of Kansas; 1999–2020	Succeeded by Toby Crouse
