= List of Alpha Phi chapters =

Alpha Phi sorority was established at Syracuse University in 1872. Called a women's fraternity when it was created, it was the fourth Greek-letter organization for women.

== Collegiate chapters ==
In the following list, active chapters are indicated in bold and inactive chapters are indicated in italics.

Chapter	Charter date and range	Institution	City or county	State, district, or province	Status	Ref.
**Alpha**	September 18, 1872	Syracuse University	Syracuse	New York	Active	
**Beta**	June 6, 1881	Northwestern University	Evanston	Illinois	Active	
**Gamma**	June 13, 1887	DePauw University	Greencastle	Indiana	Active	
**Delta**	February 2, 1889	Cornell University	Ithaca	New York	Active	
**Epsilon**	September 15, 1890 – June 1, 1950; xxxx ?	University of Minnesota	Minneapolis	Minnesota	Active	
Zeta	December 1, 1891 – 1950; 19xx ? – June 1, 1970; April 7, 1984	Goucher College	Baltimore	Maryland	Inactive	(Note: Chapter went dormant in 1950 because of the college's anti-sorority policies.)
**Eta**	November 28, 1883	Boston University	Boston	Massachusetts	Active	(Note: The third chapter's founders selected the Greek letter Eta as its name. At the next national convention in 1884, Alpha Chi decided to name its chapters alphabetically moving forward. However, Eta chapter was allowed to keep its name, even though it was the seventh letter of the Greek alphabet.)
**Theta**	May 16, 1892	University of Michigan	Ann Arbor	Michigan	Active	
**Iota**	October 19, 1896	University of Wisconsin–Madison	Madison	Wisconsin	Active	
**Kappa**	May 20, 1899 – June 1, 1944; January 1, 1978 – January 1, 1993; May 1, 2011	Stanford University	Stanford	California	Active	(Note: The chapter went dormant in 1944 when Stanford banned women's sororities. It became the first sorority to be reinstated when the university changed its policy in 1978.)
**Lambda**	May 9, 1901	University of California, Berkeley	Berkeley	California	Active	
Mu	June 9, 1903 – June 1, 1916	Barnard College	Manhattan, New York City	New York	Inactive	(Note: Chapter went dormant because of the college's anti-fraternity policies.)
**Nu**	October 1, 1906	University of Nebraska–Lincoln	Lincoln	Nebraska	Active	
**Xi**	December 4, 1906	University of Toronto	Toronto	Ontario	Active	
**Omicron**	March 4, 1910	University of Missouri	Columbia	Missouri	Active	
**Pi**	June 15, 1911	University of North Dakota	Grand Forks	North Dakota	Active	
**Rho**	March 30, 1912	Ohio State University	Columbus	Ohio	Active	
**Sigma**	May 21, 1914	University of Washington	Seattle	Washington	Active	
**Tau**	January 8, 1915	University of Oregon	Eugene	Oregon	Active	
**Upsilon**	September 15, 1916	Washburn University	Topeka	Kansas	Active	
**Phi**	September 16, 1917 – June 1, 1998; March 11, 2007	University of Oklahoma	Norman	Oklahoma	Active	
**Chi**	May 30, 1918	University of Montana	Missoula	Montana	Active	
**Psi**	May 1, 1920	University of South Dakota	Vermillion	South Dakota	Active	
**Omega**	May 14, 1920	University of Texas at Austin	Austin	Texas	Active	
**Beta Alpha**	February 10, 1922	University of Illinois Urbana-Champaign	Urbana	Illinois	Active	
**Beta Beta**	February 17, 1922	Michigan State University	East Lansing	Michigan	Active	
**Beta Gamma**	March 28, 1924 – January 1, 1987; April 29, 1990	University of Colorado Boulder	Boulder	Colorado	Active	
**Beta Delta**	September 3, 1924	University of California, Los Angeles	Los Angeles	California	Active	
**Beta Epsilon**	March 12, 1926	University of Arizona	Tucson	Arizona	Active	
**Beta Zeta**	June 12, 1928	University of Idaho	Moscow	Idaho	Active	
**Beta Eta**	October 5, 1928	University of Manitoba	Winnipeg	Manitoba	Active	(Note: Chapter formed from Sigma Chi Sigma (local).)
**Beta Theta**	June 1, 1929	University of British Columbia	Vancouver	British Columbia	Active	
**Beta Iota**	April 10, 1930	West Virginia University	Morgantown	West Virginia	Active	
Beta Kappa	May 10, 1930 – June 1, 1983	Denison University	Granville	Ohio	Inactive	
Beta Lambda	May 16, 1931 – December 1, 1988	Rollins College	Winter Park	Florida	Inactive	
**Beta Mu**	February 13, 1932 – June 1, 1963; March 7, 2009	University of Alabama	Tuscaloosa	Alabama	Active	
**Beta Nu**	May 10, 1935 – June 1, 1970; March 24, 1995	Duke University	Durham	North Carolina	Active	
Beta Xi	October 2, 1937 – January 1, 1943	American University	Washington, D.C.	District of Columbia	Inactive	(Note: The chapter went inactive during World War II when the campus closed so that it could be used by the Red Cross. When classes restarted after the war, the chapter remained inactive.)
**Beta Omicron**	October 16, 1943	Bowling Green State University	Bowling Green	Ohio	Active	
**Beta Pi**	April 27, 1945	University of Southern California	Los Angeles	California	Active	
**Beta Rho**	September 6, 1945 – September 1, 1987; March 3, 1990	Washington State University	Pullman	Washington	Active	
**Beta Sigma**	May 4, 1946 – June 1, 1965; March 23, 2012	University of Utah	Salt Lake City	Utah	Active	
**Beta Tau**	May 31, 1947	Indiana University Bloomington	Bloomington	Indiana	Active	
**Beta Upsilon**	May 17, 1947	Oregon State University	Corvallis	Oregon	Active	
**Beta Phi**	January 10, 1948 – October 8, 1979; April 1, 2012	Whitman College	Walla Walla	Washington	Active	
Beta Chi	February 14, 1948 – June 1, 1978	Bucknell University	Lewisburg	Pennsylvania	Inactive	(Note: The chapter formed from Phi Tau Sigma (local), established in 1946.)
**Beta Psi**	March 6, 1948	San Jose State University	San Jose	California	Active	(Note: Chapter formed from Ero Sophian (local), established in 1898.)
**Beta Omega**	June 5, 1948	Kent State University	Kent, Ohio	Ohio	Active	(Note: Chapter formed from Alpha Omega.)
**Gamma Alpha**	October 1, 1949	San Diego State University	San Diego	California	Active	(Note: Chapter formed from Phi Kappa Gamma (local).)
**Gamma Beta**	January 27, 1950	University of California, Santa Barbara	Santa Barbara	California	Active	
Gamma Gamma	April 1, 1950 – June 1, 1989	Drury University	Springfield	Missouri	Inactive	(Note: Chapter formed from Alpha Nu (local).)
Gamma Delta	March 25, 1950 – April 28, 1983	University of Kansas	Lawrence	Kansas	Inactive	
**Gamma Epsilon**	May 24, 1952 – June 1, 1961; October 3, 2004	Lake Forest College	Lake Forest	Illinois	Active	(Note: Chapter went dormant in 1961 when all NPC groups left the campus.)
**Gamma Zeta**	October 10, 1953	University of Puget Sound	Tacoma	Washington	Active	(Note: The chapter formed from Lambda Sigma Chi, established on April 6, 1922.)
**Gamma Eta**	April 24, 1954	University of North Texas	Denton	Texas	Active	(Note: The chapter formed from Phi Sigma Alpha (local).)
Gamma Theta	October 2, 1954 – June 1, 1961	Colorado College	Colorado Springs	Colorado	Inactive	
**Gamma Iota**	March 26, 1955	Texas Tech University	Lubbock	Texas	Active	
**Gamma Kappa**	January 7, 1956	California State University, Long Beach	Long Beach	California	Active	
Gamma Lambda	February 11, 1956 – June 1, 1960	University of Houston	Houston	Texas	Inactive	
Gamma Mu	April 14, 1956 – March 15, 1977	Georgia State University	Atlanta	Georgia	Inactive	(Note: Chapter formed from the local group D.A.D.)
**Gamma Nu**	April 13, 1957	Miami University	Oxford	Ohio	Active	
**Gamma Xi**	February 1, 1958 – June 1, 1965; March 23, 2012	Wichita State University	Wichita	Kansas	Active	
**Gamma Omicron**	March 1, 1958	Drake University	Des Moines	Iowa	Active	
**Gamma Pi**	May 3, 1958	Arizona State University	Tempe	Arizona	Active	
**Gamma Rho**	April 12, 1958	Pennsylvania State University	State College	Pennsylvania	Active	(Note: Chapter formed from Trion (local), established in April 1956.)
**Gamma Sigma**	May 24, 1958	University of Wisconsin–Stout	Menomonie	Wisconsin	Active	
**Gamma Tau**	May 24, 1958 – May 25, 1978; May 2, 2015	Willamette University	Salem	Oregon	Active	
Gamma Upsilon	November 15, 1958 – June 1, 1972	University of Wisconsin–Milwaukee	Milwaukee	Wisconsin	Inactive	(Note: 49-year-old Chapter formed from Kappa Lambda Iota (local), established in 1909.)
**Gamma Phi**	May 1, 1959 – June 1, 1972; March 19, 2011	Florida State University	Tallahassee	Florida	Active	
Gamma Chi	May 9, 1959 – June 1, 1973	Portland State University	Portland	Oregon	Inactive	(Note: Chapter formed from Vikes sorority (local), established in 1949.)
Gamma Psi	October 24, 1959 – January 1, 1969	Ripon College	Ripon	Wisconsin	Inactive	(Note: Chapter formed from Kappa Sigma Chi (local).)
**Gamma Omega**	December 5, 1959	Midwestern State University	Wichita Falls	Texas	Active	(Note: Chapter formed from Chi Gamma, established in 1952 at the Cowgirls and changing its names in 1957.)
**Delta Alpha**	February 6, 1960 – August 9, 2018; May 7, 2021	East Carolina University	Greenville	North Carolina	Active	(Note: In 2018, the chapter was suspended for violation of university policies, drugs, endangerment, and hazing until May 2021.)
**Delta Beta**	March 12, 1960	East Texas A&M University	Commerce	Texas	Active	(Note: Chapter formed from Les Choisites (local), established in 1928.) (Note: Texas A&M University at Commerce changed its name to East Texas A&M University on 7 November 2024.)
**Delta Gamma**	November 5, 1960	University of Northern Colorado	Greeley	Colorado	Active	(Note: Chapter formed from Pi Kappa Sigma (local).)
**Delta Delta**	February 25, 1961	Oklahoma City University	Oklahoma City	Oklahoma	Active	
**Delta Epsilon**	April 15, 1961	University of Iowa	Iowa City	Iowa	Active	
**Delta Zeta**	March 18, 1961	University of Maryland, College Park	College Park	Maryland	Active	
**Delta Eta**	September 23, 1961	Adrian College	Adrian	Michigan	Active	(Note: Chapter formed from Kappa Tau Delta (local), established in 1957.)
**Delta Theta**	December 8, 1962	Western Michigan University	Kalamazoo	Michigan	Active	
Delta Iota	May 18, 1962	Roanoke College	Salem	Virginia	Inactive	
**Delta Kappa**	March 2, 1963 – January 1, 1975; xxxx ?	University of Wisconsin–La Crosse	La Crosse	Wisconsin	Active	
Delta Lambda	October 7, 1962 – June 1, 1978	University of Memphis	Memphis	Tennessee	Inactive	
**Delta Mu**	April 27, 1963	Purdue University	West Lafayette	Indiana	Active	
**Delta Nu**	May 18, 1963	University of Maine	Orono	Maine	Active	
**Delta Xi**	May 11, 1963	University of Nebraska at Kearney	Kearney	Nebraska	Active	
Delta Omicron	April 4, 1964 – January 1, 1978	St. Cloud State University	St. Cloud	Minnesota	Inactive	(Note: Chapter formed from the Minerva Literary Society (local), established in 1907.)
**Delta Pi**	May 9, 1964	Indiana State University	Terre Haute	Indiana	Active	
**Delta Rho**	November 7, 1964	Ball State University	Muncie	Indiana	Active	(Note: Chapter formed from Gamma Theta (local), established in 1962.)
Delta Sigma	December 5, 1964 – June 1, 1980	University of Wisconsin–Stevens Point	Stevens Point	Wisconsin	Inactive	
**Delta Tau**	May 1, 1965 – June 1, 1980; March 23, 2014	Louisiana State University	Baton Rouge	Louisiana	Active	(Note: Chapter originated as Kappa Gamma (local) in 1923 and became the Alpha Rho chapter of Beta Sigma Omicron national in 1929. When Beta Sigma Omicron merged nationally with Zeta Tau Alpha in 1964, the LSU chapter joined Alpha Phi instead.)
**Delta Upsilon**	November 20, 1964 – September 1, 1983; xxxx ?	Baldwin Wallace University	Berea	Ohio	Active	(Note: Chapter originated as Phi Lambda Sigma (local) in 1870 and became the Alpha Pi chapter of Beta Sigma Omicron national in 1929. When Beta Sigma Omicron merged nationally with Zeta Tau Alpha in 1964, the Baldwin Wallace chapter joined Alpha Phi instead.)
Delta Phi	January 30, 1965 – xxxx ?	Indiana University of Pennsylvania	Indiana	Pennsylvania	Inactive	(Note: Chapter originated as Zeta Kappa Delta (local) in 1950 and became the Beta Kappa chapter of Beta Sigma Omicron national in 1951. When Beta Sigma Omicron merged nationally with Zeta Tau Alpha in 1964, the Indiana University chapter joined Alpha Phi instead.)
**Delta Chi**	November 20, 1965	William Woods University	Fulton	Missouri	Active	
Delta Psi	January 29, 1966 – June 1, 1979	University of Wisconsin–Oshkosh	Oshkosh	Wisconsin	Inactive	
Delta Omega	February 26, 1966 – January 19, 1988	Moorhead State University	Moorhead	Minnesota	Inactive	
**Epsilon Alpha**	April 15, 1967	Ashland University	Ashland	Ohio	Active	(Note: Chapter formed from Beta Phi Beta (local), established on April 19, 1965.)
**Epsilon Beta**	January 13, 1968	Butler University	Indianapolis	Indiana	Active	
**Epsilon Gamma**	January 13, 1968	California State University, Sacramento	Sacramento	California	Active	
**Epsilon Delta**	March 22, 1969 – November 1, 1978; xxxx ?	Northern Illinois University	DeKalb	Illinois	Active	(Note: Chapter formed from Delta Sigma (local).)
Epsilon Epsilon	February 26, 1969	Longwood University	Farmville	Virginia	Inactive	
Epsilon Zeta	December 6, 1969 – June 1, 1970	Central Michigan University	Mount Pleasant	Michigan	Inactive	(Note: Chapter formed from Omega Chi (local).)
**Epsilon Eta**	February 7, 1970	Old Dominion University	Norfolk	Virginia	Active	
**Epsilon Theta**	March 7, 1970	University of Northern Iowa	Cedar Falls	Iowa	Active	(Note: Chapter formed from Phi Sigma Phi (local), established in 1917.)
**Epsilon Iota**	April 4, 1970	Duquesne University	Pittsburgh	Pennsylvania	Active	(Note: Chapter formed from Sigma Phi Delta (local), established in 1932.)
**Epsilon Kappa**	April 16, 1971 – January 1, 1983; xxxx ?	West Chester University	West Chester	Pennsylvania	Active	
Epsilon Lambda	March 20, 1971	University of Texas at Arlington	Arlington	Texas	Inactive	
Epsilon Mu	February 5, 1972 – June 1, 1991	Lander University	Greenwood	South Carolina	Inactive	
**Epsilon Nu**	April 23, 1972	University of Delaware	Newark	Delaware	Active	(Note: Chapter formed from Kappa Chi (local).)
**Epsilon Xi**	March 3, 1974 – April 1, 1983; xxxx ?	Southern Illinois University Edwardsville	Edwardsville	Illinois	Active	(Note: Chapter formed from Mu Phi Alpha (local).)
Epsilon Omicron	March 20, 1974 – xxxx ?	Austin Peay State University	Clarksville	Tennessee	Inactive	(Note: Chapter formed from Theta Phi Epsilon (local).)
Epsilon Pi	January 18, 1974 – xxxx ?	University of Evansville	Evansville	Indiana	Inactive	
**Epsilon Rho**	February 10, 1974 – March 21, 1983; xxxx ?	University of California, Davis	Davis	California	Active	
Epsilon Sigma	April 21, 1974 – November 1, 1978	Dallas Baptist University	Dallas	Texas	Inactive	(Note: Chapter formed from Alpha Delta Chi (local).)
Epsilon Tau	November 23, 1974 – xxxx ?	Louisiana State University Shreveport	Shreveport	Louisiana	Inactive	
**Epsilon Upsilon**	December 8, 1974	California State University, Northridge	Los Angeles	California	Active	
Epsilon Phi	April 19, 1975 – December 1, 1982; January 26, 1991 – xxxx ?	North Carolina State University	Raleigh	North Carolina	Inactive	
**Epsilon Chi**	May 17, 1975	California Polytechnic State University, San Luis Obispo	San Luis Obispo	California	Active	
**Epsilon Psi**	November 15, 1975 – June 1, 1987; xxxx ?	Lehigh University	Bethlehem	Pennsylvania	Active	
Epsilon Omega	May 11, 1975 – xxxx ?	Texas A&M University	College Station	Texas	Inactive	
**Zeta Alpha**	April 24, 1976	Eastern Illinois University	Charleston	Illinois	Active	
**Zeta Beta**	May 15, 1976	Loyola Marymount University	Los Angeles	California	Active	
**Zeta Gamma**	November 13, 1976	Santa Clara University	Santa Clara	California	Active	
**Zeta Delta**	January 15, 1977 – June 1, 1998; March 12, 2015	Iowa State University	Ames	Iowa	Active	
**Zeta Epsilon**	March 4, 1978 – June 1, 1990; xxxx ?	Indiana University Southeast	New Albany	Indiana	Active	
Zeta Zeta	April 1, 1978 – October 1, 1981	Murray State University	Murray	Kentucky	Inactive	
Zeta Eta	April 22, 1977 – xxxx ?	Newberry College	Newberry	South Carolina	Inactive	(Note: Chapter formed from a social group, The Spirit of ‘76 Club (local), established in November 1975.)
Zeta Theta	November 11, 1978 – September 2020	Tufts University	Medford	Massachusetts	Inactive	(Note: The chapter and its 103 members disaffiliated from Alpha Phi and became The Ivy (local).)
**Zeta Iota**	December 2, 1978 – June 1, 1998; April 16, 2000	University of Virginia	Charlottesville	Virginia	Active	
Zeta Kappa	February 24, 1979 – June 1, 1989	Texas State University	San Marcos	Texas	Inactive	
Zeta Lambda	March 31, 1979 – January 1, 1987	Southern New Hampshire University	Manchester	New Hampshire	Inactive	
Zeta Mu	April 7, 1979 – June 1, 1992	Colorado State University	Fort Collins	Colorado	Inactive	
Zeta Nu	April 21, 1979 – June 1, 1989	Texas Christian University	Fort Worth	Texas	Inactive	
**Zeta Xi**	February 2, 1980	Elmhurst University	Elmhurst	Illinois	Active	
**Zeta Omicron**	April 5, 1981 – June 1, 1998; September 26, 1998	Johns Hopkins University	Baltimore	Maryland	Active	
**Zeta Pi**	March 27, 1982	Case Western Reserve University	Cleveland	Ohio	Active	
**Zeta Rho**	April 3, 1982	Bentley University	Waltham	Massachusetts	Active	
**Zeta Sigma**	April 25, 1982 – June 1, 2001; April 6, 2008	Franklin & Marshall College	Lancaster	Pennsylvania	Active	
Zeta Tau	April 9, 1983 – June 1, 1994	Illinois State University	Normal	Illinois	Inactive	
**Zeta Upsilon**	October 8, 1983	Washington University in St. Louis	St. Louis	Missouri	Active	
**Zeta Phi**	February 11, 1984	Massachusetts Institute of Technology	Cambridge	Massachusetts	Active	
Zeta Chi	September 23, 1983 – June 1, 1998	Columbia University	New York City	New York	Inactive	
**Zeta Psi**	February 11, 1984	University of Dayton	Dayton	Ohio	Active	(Note: Chapter formed from Club Amherst (local).)
Zeta Omega	October 26, 1985 – May 1, 1987	Northwood University	Midland	Michigan	Inactive	
**Eta Alpha**	March 1, 1986	University of New Hampshire	Durham	New Hampshire	Active	
**Eta Beta**	April 19, 1986	California State University, San Bernardino	San Bernardino	California	Active	
**Eta Gamma**	April 26, 1986	University of Akron	Akron	Ohio	Active	
**Eta Delta**	April 11, 1987	California State University, East Bay	Hayward	California	Active	
**Eta Epsilon**	April 25, 1987	Villanova University	Villanova	Pennsylvania	Active	
Eta Zeta	November 7, 1987 – September 26, 2011	State University of New York at Binghamton	Binghamton	New York	Inactive	
**Eta Eta**	February 6, 1988	Seton Hall University	South Orange	New Jersey	Active	
**Eta Theta**	February 13, 1988	San Francisco State University	San Francisco	California	Active	
**Eta Iota**	April 9, 1988	University of Pennsylvania	Philadelphia	Pennsylvania	Active	
**Eta Kappa**	May 7, 1988	University of California, Irvine	Irvine	California	Active	
**Eta Lambda**	October 22, 1988	George Mason University	Fairfax	Virginia	Active	
**Eta Mu**	January 21, 1989	Marquette University	Milwaukee	Wisconsin	Active	
Eta Nu	March 11, 1989 – March 22, 2010	State University of New York at Albany	Albany	New York	Inactive	
**Eta Xi**	March 18, 1989	University of North Carolina Wilmington	Wilmington	North Carolina	Active	
**Eta Omicron**	April 8, 1989	Virginia Tech	Blacksburg	Virginia	Active	
Eta Pi	April 15, 1989 – xxxx ?	University of Richmond	Richmond	Virginia	Inactive	
Eta Rho	April 22, 1989 – May 9, 2016	University of San Diego	San Diego	California	Inactive	
**Eta Sigma**	April 23, 1989	Lafayette College	Easton	Pennsylvania	Active	(Note: Chapter formed from Lambda Sigma Sigma (local).)
**Eta Tau**	April 30, 1989	State University of New York at Cortland	Cortland	New York	Active	
**Eta Upsilon**	May 6, 1989	Chapman University	Orange	California	Active	
Eta Phi	May 20, 1989 – June 1, 1991	State University of New York at Stony Brook	Stony Brook	New York	Inactive	
**Eta Chi**	November 25, 1989	Bishop's University	Lennoxville	Quebec	Active	(Note: Chapter formed from Zeta Gamma (local), established in 1986.)
**Eta Psi**	January 27, 1990	Eastern Washington University	Cheney	Washington	Active	
**Eta Omega**	February 24, 1990	Towson University	Towson	Maryland	Active	
**Theta Alpha**	February 25, 1990	Linfield University	McMinnville	Oregon	Active	(Note: Chapter formed from Kappa Alpha Phi (local), established in 1902.)
Theta Beta	March 31, 1990 – June 1, 1994	Bryant University	Smithfield	Rhode Island	Inactive	
Theta Gamma	April 1, 1990 – June 1, 1999	Truman State University	Kirksville	Missouri	Inactive	
**Theta Delta**	April 21, 1990 – June 1, 2003; April 21, 2012	Creighton University	Omaha	Nebraska	Active	
**Theta Epsilon**	April 22, 1990	State University of New York at Buffalo	Buffalo	New York	Active	
**Theta Zeta**	October 6, 1990	Florida Institute of Technology	Melbourne	Florida	Active	
**Theta Eta**	January 12, 1991	University of Western Ontario	London	Ontario	Active	
**Theta Theta**	February 2, 1991	Saint Joseph's University	Philadelphia	Pennsylvania	Active	
**Theta Iota**	February 16, 1991	James Madison University	Harrisonburg	Virginia	Active	
**Theta Kappa**	March 2, 1991	University of Rochester	Rochester	New York	Active	
**Theta Lambda**	April 20, 1991	University of Central Missouri	Warrensburg	Missouri	Active	
**Theta Mu**	April 21, 1991	Hofstra University	Hempstead	New York	Active	
**Theta Nu**	April 27, 1991	Appalachian State University	Boone	North Carolina	Active	
**Theta Xi**	April 11, 1992 – January 21, 2026	Shippensburg University of Pennsylvania	Shippensburg	Pennsylvania	Inactive	
Theta Omicron	January 30, 1993 – June 1, 2007	McMaster University	Hamilton	Ontario	Inactive	
Theta Pi	April 17, 1993	Emory University	Atlanta	Georgia	Active	
**Theta Rho**	December 3, 1994	Cameron University	Lawton	Oklahoma	Active	
**Theta Sigma**	April 1, 1995	Southern Utah University	Cedar City	Utah	Active	(Note: Chapter formed from Phi Alpha Beta (local), established in 1923 and dormant between the 1960s and its re-established in 1988.)
**Theta Tau**	April 23, 1995	Rensselaer Polytechnic Institute	Troy	New York	Active	(Note: Chapter formed from Phi Alpha Sigma (local), established in 1986.)
**Theta Upsilon**	May 13, 1995	California State University, Chico	Chico	California	Active	
**Theta Phi**	July 29, 1995	Christopher Newport University	Newport News	Virginia	Active	
Theta Chi	May 4, 1996 – June 1, 1999	University of North Carolina at Asheville	Asheville	North Carolina	Inactive	(Note: Chapter formed from Delta Kappa Xi (local), established in March 1992 to affiliate with a national sorority.)
**Theta Psi**	March 5, 1996	State University of New York at Plattsburgh	Plattsburgh	New York	Active	(Note: Chapter formed from Alpha Phi Gamma (local), established in 1981 to become a chapter of Alpha Phi.)
**Theta Omega**	May 11, 1996	Barry University	Miami Shores	Florida	Active	
**Iota Alpha**	October 13, 1996	Pepperdine University	Los Angeles County	California	Active	(Note: Chapter formed from Delta Tau Omega, established in 1969.)
**Iota Beta**	May 3, 1997	St. Mary's University, Texas	San Antonio	Texas	Active	
**Iota Gamma**	April 4, 1998	University of the Pacific	Stockton	California	Active	
Iota Delta	March 29, 1999 – October 18, 2016	University of Rhode Island	Kingston	Rhode Island	Inactive	
**Iota Epsilon**	September 24, 2000	Kettering University	Flint	Michigan	Active	(Note: Chapter formed when Beta Sigma Phi (local), dissolved its charter, giving members the choice to join Alpha Phi.)
**Iota Zeta**	November 5, 2000	Colorado School of Mines	Golden	Colorado	Active	
**Iota Eta**	January 2, 2002	DePaul University	Chicago	Illinois	Active	
**Iota Theta**	March 3, 2002	Wilfrid Laurier University	Waterloo	Ontario	Active	
**Iota Iota**	October 19, 2002	George Washington University	Washington, D.C.	District of Columbia	Active	
**Iota Kappa**	April 28, 2007	Dartmouth College	Hanover	New Hampshire	Active	
**Iota Lambda**	March 2, 2008	University of Connecticut	Storrs	Connecticut	Active	
**Iota Mu**	April 17, 2009	Georgia Institute of Technology	Atlanta	Georgia	Active	
**Iota Nu**	April 10, 2010	University of Kentucky	Lexington	Kentucky	Active	
**Iota Xi**	May 2, 2010	University of Denver	Denver	Colorado	Active	
**Iota Omicron**	April 2, 2011	Worcester Polytechnic Institute	Worcester	Massachusetts	Active	
**Iota Pi**	May 5, 2012	Northern Arizona University	Flagstaff	Arizona	Active	
**Iota Rho**	April 28, 2012	Clemson University	Clemson	South Carolina	Active	
**Iota Sigma**	April 6, 2013	Carnegie Mellon University	Pittsburgh	Pennsylvania	Active	
**Iota Tau**	April 25, 2013 – August 2018	Harvard University	Cambridge	Massachusetts	Active	(Note: The chapter disaffiliated and became a co-ed local group called The Ivey after Harvard banned single-sex organizations in December 2017. It was the last sorority at the university, holding on with hopes that the national sorority would have a successful lawsuit against the university.)
**Iota Upsilon**	March 29, 2014	University of Ottawa	Ottawa	Ontario	Active	(Note: Chapter formed from Kappa Zeta Psi (local), established in October 2010.)
**Iota Phi**	April 19, 2015	University of St. Francis	Joliet	Illinois	Active	
**Iota Chi**	April 3, 2016	Yale University	New Haven	Connecticut	Active	
**Iota Psi**	April 3, 2016	University of North Florida	Jacksonville	Florida	Active	
**Iota Omega**	April 3, 2016	University of Mississippi	Oxford	Mississippi	Active	
**Kappa Alpha**	April 16, 2016	University of North Carolina at Chapel Hill	Chapel Hill	North Carolina	Active	
**Kappa Beta**	May 22, 2016	University of California, San Diego	San Diego	California	Active	
**Kappa Gamma**	March 26, 2017	Southeast Missouri State University	Cape Girardeau	Missouri	Active	
**Kappa Delta**	May 6, 2017	Stevens Institute of Technology	Hoboken	New Jersey	Active	
**Kappa Epsilon**	March 3, 2018	University of Georgia	Athens	Georgia	Active	
**Kappa Zeta**	April 14, 2018	McGill University	Montreal	Quebec	Active	
**Kappa Eta**	November 11, 2018	University of Florida	Gainesville	Florida	Active	
**Kappa Theta**	April 27, 2019	Baylor University	Waco	Texas	Active	
**Kappa Iota**	2019	University of Wyoming	Laramie	Wyoming	Active	
**Kappa Kappa**	2022	Angelo State University	San Angelo	Texas	Active	
**Kappa Lambda**	2022	University of Colorado Denver	Denver	Colorado	Active	
**Kappa Mu**	2024	University of Arkansas	Fayetteville	Arkansas	Colony	

== See also ==
- List of Alpha Phi members
