= Pauline Gubbels =

Politician and member New Mexico House of Representatives

Pauline K. Gubbels

Member of the New Mexico House of Representatives from the 30th district
- In office January 1995 – November 19, 2002
- Preceded by: John J. McMullan
- Succeeded by: Robert W. White

Member of the Albuquerque City Council from the 7th district
- In office December 1989 – November 1993
- Preceded by: Nadyne Bicknell
- Succeeded by: Vickie Perea

Personal details
- Born: January 5, 1936 (age 90) East Bernard, Texas, U.S.
- Party: Republican
- Spouse: Matt
- Children: 6
- Education: University of Texas (BS); Purdue University (MS)

Pauline K. Gubbels (born January 5, 1936) was an American politician who served in the New Mexico House of Representatives. She represented the 30th district from 1995 until her resignation in November 2002. Her district was in Bernalillo County. She previously served on the Albuquerque City Council from 1989 to 1993.

Gubbels received her BS from the University of Texas and her MS from Purdue University. She and her husband, Matt, have six children.
