= Janet Murguía =

American civil rights activist

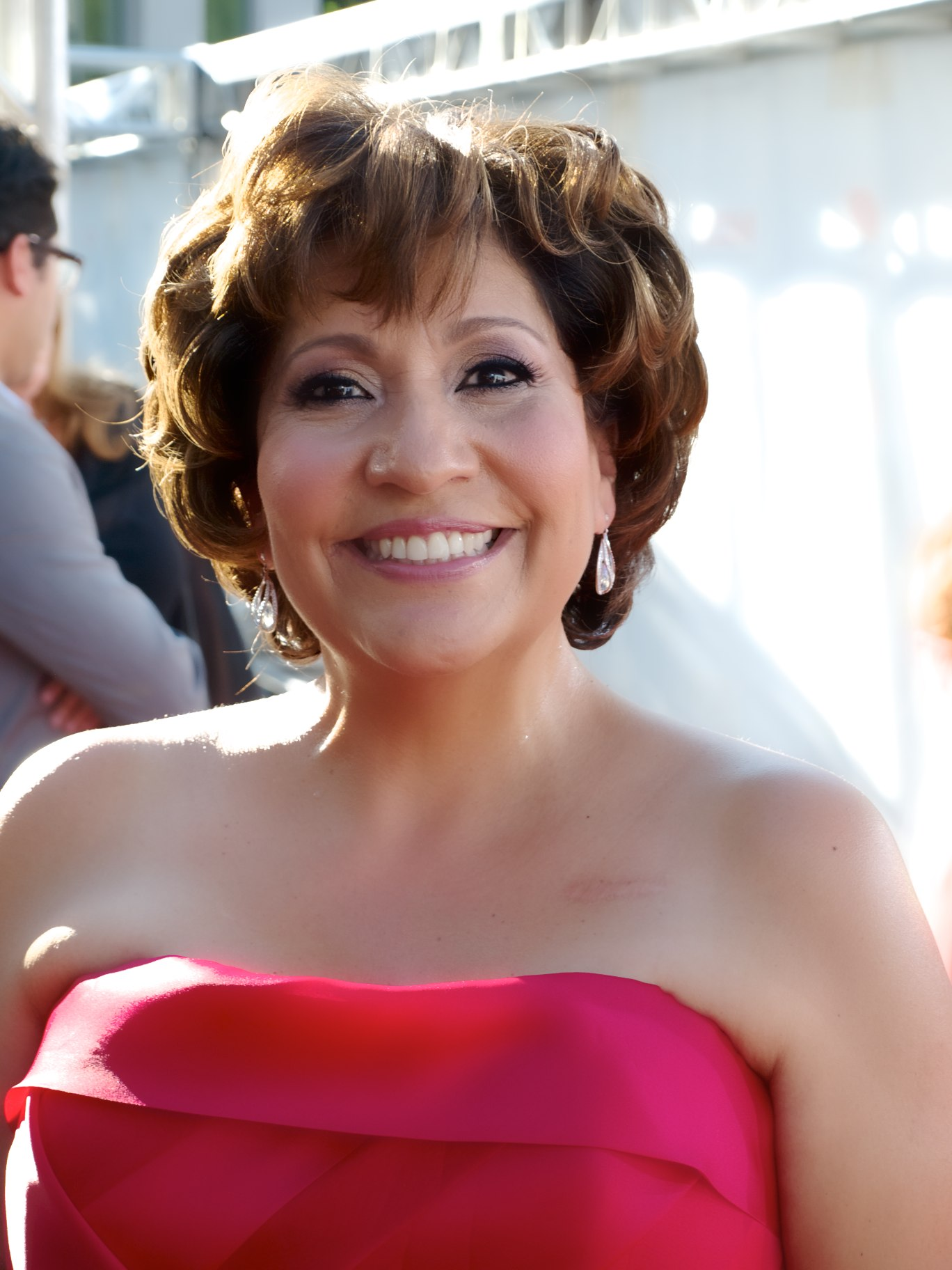
- Murguía at the Alma Awards in 2012
- Born: September 6, 1960 (age 65); Kansas City, Kansas, U.S.
- Education: University of Kansas, Lawrence (BA, BS, JD)
- Political party: Democratic
- Relatives: Mary H. Murguia (twin sister); Carlos Murguia (brother)

Janet Murguía (born September 6, 1960) is an American civil rights activist in the United States. She is president of UnidosUS, formerly National Council of La Raza (NCLR), a Hispanic advocacy organization. Her twin sister Mary and elder brother Carlos are both federal judges.

== Early life ==
Murguía was born September 6, 1960 in Kansas City, Kansas. She grew up in the Argentine section of Kansas City, in a small house with 7 brothers and sisters. After Murguía's parents migrated from Mexico in the late 1940's her father worked as a laborer for a steel company meanwhile her mother stayed at home to watch over her, her siblings, and other children from the neighborhood. Murguía graduated in 1982 from the University of Kansas with a bachelors of art's in Spanish language and literature, and a bachelors of science in journalism. She continued her studies at the University of Kansas in law, graduating with a JD in 1985.

== National Council of La Raza ==
On January 1, 2005, Murguía replaced Raul Yzaguirre as the president and CEO of the National Council of La Raza (NCLR), the largest national Hispanic civil rights advocacy organization in the U.S. As President and CEO, Murguía often testifies before Congress about issues affecting the Latino community including education, health care, immigration reform, civil rights and the economy. In her role as a spokesperson for the organization, she is frequently interviewed by various news outlets and has appeared on many news programs.

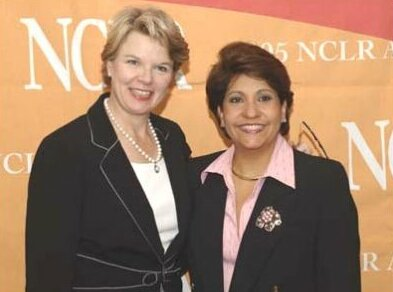
Education Secretary Margaret Spellings with Janet Murguía on July 18, 2005

Murguía currently serves as a board member of the Independent Sector, a coalition of nonprofits, foundations, and corporations, and is an executive committee member of the Leadership Conference on Civil Rights. She also sits on the board of the Hispanic Association on Corporate Responsibility and the National Hispanic Leadership Agenda. Murguia serves on the advisory board of the National Hispanic University.

Murguía endorsed Democratic candidate Hillary Clinton in the 2016 U.S. presidential election.

== Past positions held ==
In 2001, Murguía joined the University of Kansas (KU) as Executive Vice Chancellor for University Relations. Murguía managed KU's strategic planning and marketing efforts on four campuses.

Before joining KU, she served as deputy campaign manager and director of constituency outreach for the Al Gore's presidential campaign during the 2000 presidential election where she was the primary liaison between former Vice President Gore and national constituency groups. She also served as a spokesperson for the campaign, working with radio, print, and TV media outlets.

Murguía served seven years as legislative counsel to former Kansas Congressman Jim Slattery before working at the White House from 1994 to 2000. She eventually served as deputy assistant to President Bill Clinton, providing strategic and legislative advice to the president. She also served as deputy director of legislative affairs where she was in charge of the legislative staff and acted as a senior White House liaison to Congress.

== Honors ==
Murguía has received multiple accolades for her trajectory as an activist and leader. She has been named as one of Latino Leaders Magazine's "101 Top Leaders of the Hispanic Community," The Non-profit Times' "Power and Influence Top 50," People En Espanol's "'100 Most Powerful Women in Washington," and Hispanics Magazine's "100 Top Latinas" and "100 Most Influential Hispanics."

In 2022, Murguía was named as one of USA Today's Women of the Year, which recognizes women who have made a significant impact.
