= Dorothy Wright Nelson =

American judge (born 1928)

Dorothy Nelson
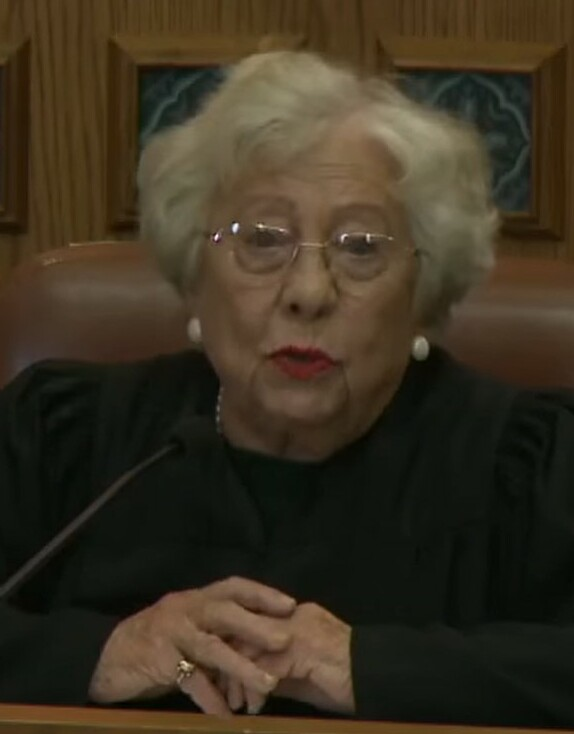
- Nelson in 2018

Senior Judge of the United States Court of Appeals for the Ninth Circuit
- Incumbent
- Assumed office January 1, 1995

Judge of the United States Court of Appeals for the Ninth Circuit
- In office December 20, 1979 – January 1, 1995
- Appointed by: Jimmy Carter
- Preceded by: Seat established
- Succeeded by: Sidney R. Thomas

Personal details
- Born: Dorothy Jean Wright; September 30, 1928 (age 97) San Pedro, California, U.S.
- Spouse: James Nelson (m. 1950; died 2011)
- Children: 2
- Education: University of California, Los Angeles (BA, JD); University of Southern California (LLM)

Dorothy Wright Nelson (born Dorothy Jean Wright; September 30, 1928) is a senior United States circuit judge of the United States Court of Appeals for the Ninth Circuit.

== Education and career ==
Born in San Pedro, California, Wright received an Artium Baccalaureus degree from the University of California, Los Angeles in 1950, a Juris Doctor from UCLA School of Law in 1953, and a Master of Laws from the USC Gould School of Law in 1956. She was a research associate fellow at the Gould School of Law from 1953 to 1956. She was in private practice in Los Angeles, California from 1954 to 1957. She was a member of the faculty of the Gould School of Law from 1957 to 1980. She was an instructor from 1957 to 1958. She was an assistant professor from 1958 to 1961. She was an associate professor from 1961 to 1967. She was an associate dean from 1965 to 1967. She was an interim dean from 1967 to 1969 and because of her achievement she was named Woman of the Year by the Los Angeles Times. She was a professor from 1967 to 1980. She was a dean from 1969 to 1980. She was an adjunct professor of law at the Gould School of Law starting 1980.

== Federal judicial service ==
Nelson was nominated by President Jimmy Carter on September 28, 1979, to the United States Court of Appeals for the Ninth Circuit, to a new seat created by 92 Stat. 1629. She was confirmed by the United States Senate on December 19, 1979, and received her commission on December 20, 1979. She assumed senior status on January 1, 1995. She published an article in the Southern California Law Review. She is the author of a book, Judicial Administration and the Administration of Justice, published by West Lawbook.

=== Supreme Court consideration ===
In 1973 there was discussion she might be nominated to the US Supreme Court in the news.

=== Notable cases ===
On February 1, 2018, Nelson ruled that the County of Maui violated the Clean Water Act when it discharged pollutants without a permit. The Supreme Court mostly affirmed in County of Maui v. Hawaii Wildlife Fund.

== Personal life ==
In 1950, Wright married James F. Nelson (1927–2011), a longtime Los Angeles Municipal Court judge. The couple had two children.

She is an active member of the Baháʼí Faith and served in the National Spiritual Assembly of the Baháʼís of United States for many years. She became a Baháʼí following the suggestion to explore the religion from Donald Barrett in 1954 along with about 70 others across a decade. Barrett would go on to serve at the Baháʼí World Center in 1979. In 1989, she was awarded an honorary Doctor of Laws (LL.D.) degree from Whittier College.

== See also ==
- List of United States federal judges by longevity of service

Legal offices
New seat	Judge of the United States Court of Appeals for the Ninth Circuit; 1979–1995	Succeeded by Sidney R. Thomas
