= UnidosUS =

U.S. Latino advocacy nonprofit

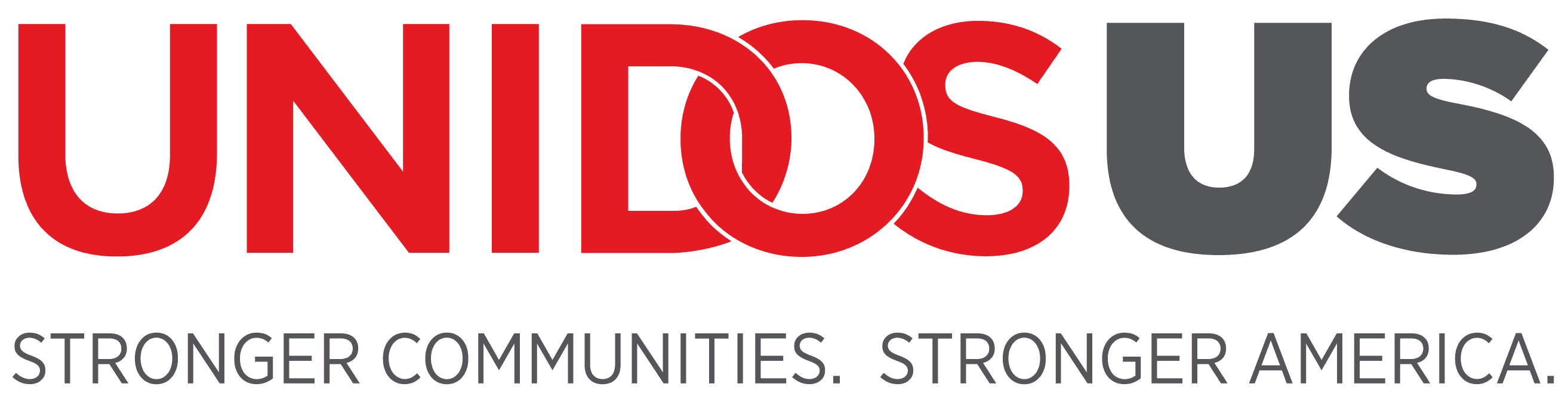
- Formation: 1968; 58 years ago (as National Council of La Raza)
- Headquarters: Washington, D.C., U.S.
- Location: United States
- President/CEO: Janet Murguía
- Revenue: $75.9 million (2024)
- Expenses: $72.3 million (2024)
- Endowment: $140 million (2024)
- Website: unidosus.org

UnidosUS, formerly National Council of La Raza (NCLR) (La Raza), is the United States's largest Latino nonprofit advocacy organization. It advocates in favor of progressive public policy changes including immigration reform, a path to citizenship for young people brought illegally to the U.S., and reduced deportations.

Founded in 1968 (as NCLR), UnidosUS has regional offices in Chicago, Los Angeles, New York, Miami, Phoenix, San Antonio and is headquartered in Washington, D.C.

== History ==
NCLR's former logo before becoming UnidosUS

In 1963, a group of Mexican Americans in Washington, D.C., formed the National Organization for Mexican American Services (NOMAS). The organization existed primarily to provide technical assistance to Hispanic groups and bring them together under one umbrella. NOMAS presented a proposal to the Ford Foundation to establish an organization that could provide technical assistance and organizational structure to the Mexican American community. The Ford Foundation hired Herman Gallegos, Julian Samora, and Ernesto Galarza to travel the Southwest and make a recommendation on how the Ford Foundation could help Mexican Americans.

Gallegos, Samora and Galarza founded the Southwest Council of La Raza (SWCLR) in Phoenix, Arizona, in 1968. SWCLR was given financial support from the Ford Foundation, the National Council of Churches, and the United Auto Workers, and the organization received 501(c)(3) status later that year.

In 1973, the SWCLR became a national organization, changed its name to the National Council of La Raza, and moved its headquarters to Washington, D.C. Early disagreements among the organization's leadership caused the Ford Foundation to threaten to withhold funding, resulting in President Henry Santiestevan's resignation and the election of Raul Yzaguirre.

The Spanish word raza is often translated into English as race. The phrase La Raza has a particular history in the context of political activism in which NCLR uses it. NCLR uses "La Raza" to refer to "the people" or "the Hispanic people of the New World".

Beginning in about 1975, the NCLR began expanding its focus to include the issues of non-Mexican American Latinos. This policy was made official in 1979. By 1980, the NCLR was funded almost entirely by the federal government.

When the Reagan Administration reduced available federal funding, the NCLR cut back the scale of its operations. As a result, the organization began focusing on national policy and concentrating its efforts in Washington, D.C. After the 1996 Personal Responsibility and Work Opportunity Act, state governments exerted more control over the disbursement of welfare funds, which led to the development of the NCLR's Field Advocacy Project to influence decisions at the state and local levels.

On January 1, 2005, Janet Murguía replaced Raul Yzaguirre as the president and CEO.

On July 10, 2017, NCLR announced its new name, UnidosUS.

On October 10, 2021, UnidosUS announced that it would sever all ties with Facebook after a former employee of the social media platform revealed the negative impact that the social media platform itself has caused in society, including the proliferation of hate speech and misinformation.

== Programs ==
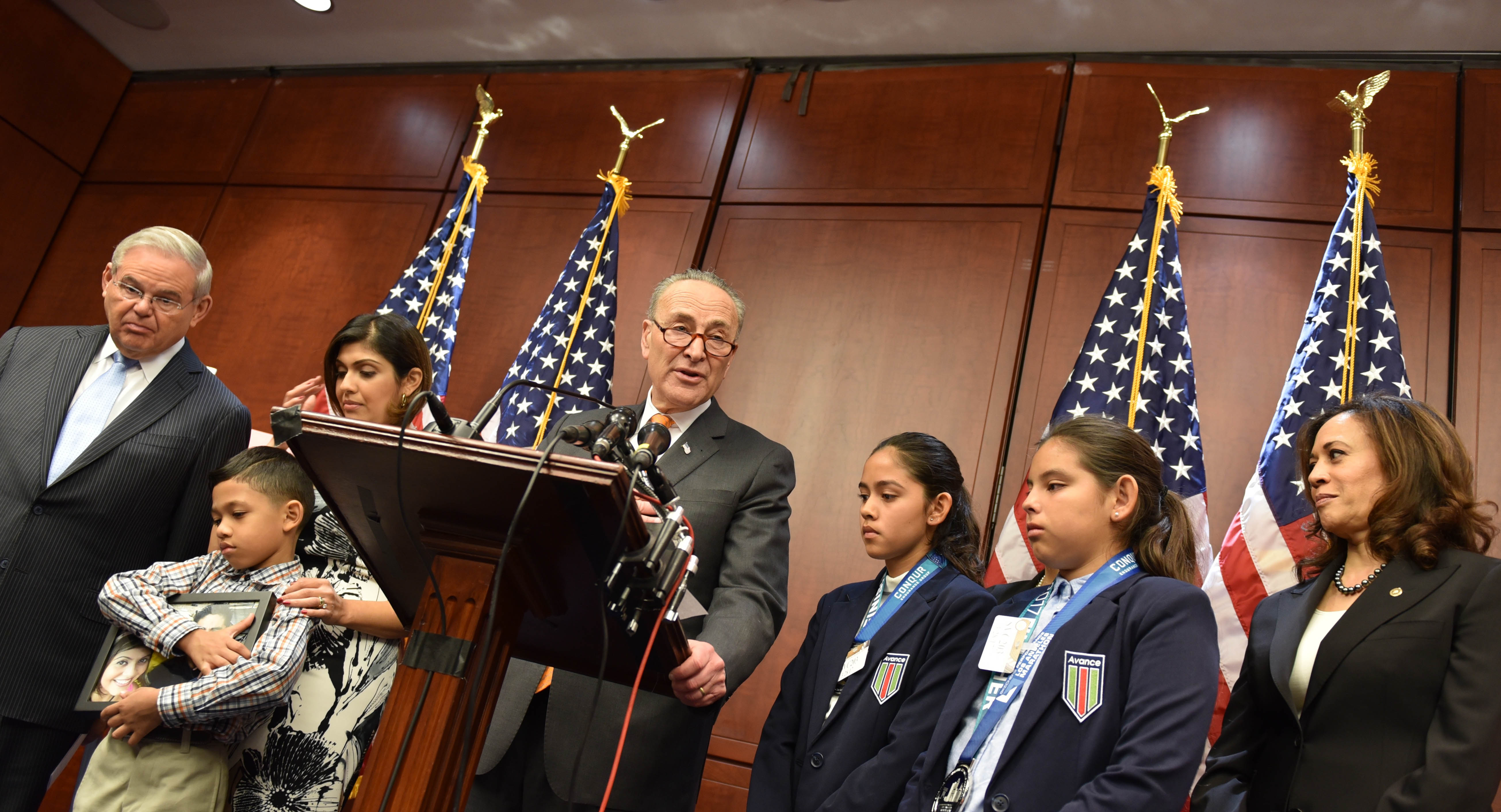
A press conference with UnidosUS with Senators Chuck Schumer and Kamala Harris in 2017

The organization holds an annual conference. In 2016, Elizabeth Warren and Steve St. Angelo spoke at the conference. In 2019, Janet Murguía spoke at the conference.

== Funding ==
Prior to 2000, three-quarters of the organization's funding came from private sources, including individuals and corporations, and one-quarter of its funding came from the federal government. As of 2015, the organization reported receiving 85% of its funding from individuals, corporations, and foundations, and 15% of its funding from the government.

== See also ==
- Related articles
  - CASA de Maryland: State affiliate
  - Los Super Seven: Fundraising album
  - ALMA Award: American Latino Media Arts Awards
- Other Mexican American organizations
  - American GI Forum
  - SVREP
  - LULAC
  - MALDEF
  - La Raza
  - MEChA
  - MAPA
