= Mary H. Murguia =

American judge (born 1960)

Mary Murguia
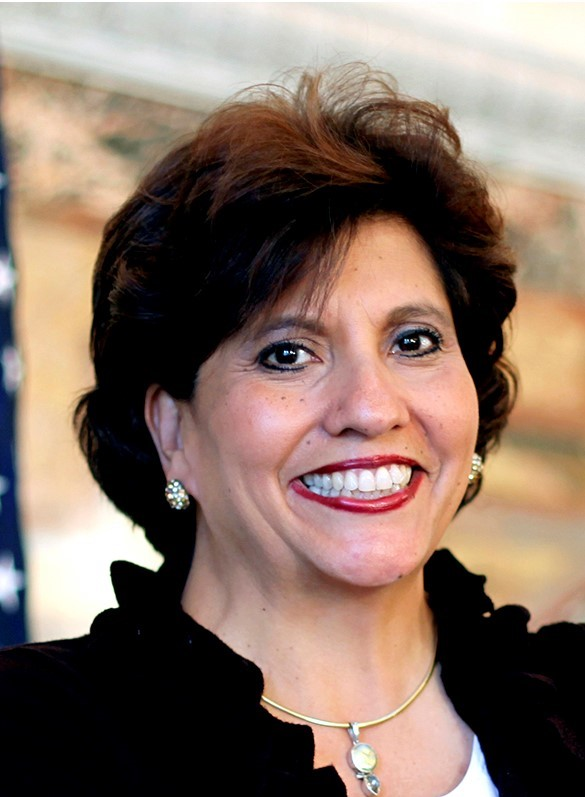

Chief Judge of the United States Court of Appeals for the Ninth Circuit
- Incumbent
- Assumed office December 1, 2021
- Preceded by: Sidney R. Thomas

Judge of the United States Court of Appeals for the Ninth Circuit
- Incumbent
- Assumed office January 4, 2011
- Appointed by: Barack Obama
- Preceded by: Michael Daly Hawkins

Judge of the United States District Court for the District of Arizona
- In office October 13, 2000 – January 4, 2011
- Appointed by: Bill Clinton
- Preceded by: Seat established
- Succeeded by: Diane Humetewa

Personal details
- Born: Mary Helen Murguia; September 6, 1960 (age 65) Kansas City, Kansas, U.S.
- Relatives: Janet Murguía (sister); Carlos Murguia (brother)
- Education: University of Kansas (BA, BS, JD)

Mary Helen Murguia (born September 6, 1960) is an American lawyer and jurist serving as the Chief United States circuit judge of the United States Court of Appeals for the Ninth Circuit. She previously served as a U.S. district judge of the United States District Court for the District of Arizona from 2000 to 2011.

== Early life and education ==
Murguia is one of seven children of Alfred and Amalia Murguia, who emigrated from Mexico in 1950. She was born in 1960 in Kansas City, Kansas. Murguia was raised in the Kansas City community of Argentine.

Murguia earned two bachelor's degrees (a Bachelor of Arts and a Bachelor of Science) from the University of Kansas in 1982. She then earned a Juris Doctor from the University of Kansas Law School in 1985.

== Professional career ==
Murguia served as an assistant district attorney of Wyandotte County, Kansas, from 1985 until 1990. From 1990 until 2000, Murguia served as an assistant United States attorney in the United States Attorney's Office for the District of Arizona, and concurrently served in the Executive Office for U.S. Attorneys from 1998 until 2000. She was counsel to the director's staff from 1998 until 1999, and the principal deputy director in 1999. She was a director from 1999 until 2000.

== Federal judicial service ==
=== District court service ===
On July 21, 2000, President Bill Clinton nominated Murguia to a new seat on the United States District Court for the District of Arizona that was created by 113 Stat. 1501. The United States Senate confirmed Murguia on October 3, 2000, and she received her commission on October 13, 2000. Her service as a district court judge was terminated on January 4, 2011 when she was elevated to the court of appeals.

=== Court of appeals service ===
On March 25, 2010, President Barack Obama nominated Murguia to a fill a vacancy on the United States Court of Appeals for the Ninth Circuit that was created when Judge Michael Daly Hawkins assumed senior status. On December 22, 2010, she was confirmed by the United States Senate by a 89–0 vote. On January 4, 2011, she received her commission and took the oath of office. She became Chief Judge on December 1, 2021.

She had been suggested as a potential nominee to the Supreme Court in Obama's second term.

== Notable rulings ==
=== Elton Simpson case ===
On March 14, 2011, Murguia acquitted Elton Simpson of making a false statement to federal agents involving terrorism, and released him on probation with a minor fine for lesser charges. Simpson had allegedly lied to FBI agents about his intent to travel to Somalia to join up with terrorist groups to kill non-Muslims, but Murguia declined to enhance his sentence based on the government's evidence. Four years later, Simpson was one of two terrorists who attacked a free speech event in Texas, injuring an unarmed security guard and being killed in the process. Evidence indicated that after Murguia released him, Simpson became involved with the terrorist organization Islamic State of Iraq and the Levant, who immediately after the attack claimed Simpson was a "soldier for the caliphate".

=== Melendres v. Arpaio ===
Murguia recused herself from the federal racial profiling case against Maricopa County Sheriff Joe Arpaio in February 2009. Arpaio's attorneys alleged Murguia had, "...a natural, personal bias in favor of the Plaintiffs," based upon her sister's leadership of National Council of La Raza, which has been highly critical of Arpaio.

The Melendres case was reassigned. In May 2013, Judge G. Murray Snow ruled that Arpaio had indeed engaged in racial profiling. In 2014, Snow found Arpaio had violated court orders addressing cessation of racial profiling, and began proceedings to hold Arpaio in contempt of court. Arpaio has also accused Snow of bias, and initiated previously-secret investigations into the alleged bias.

=== The United States of America v. Victor Manuel Raya-Vaca ===
In 2014, a case was brought by the United States of America against Raya-Vaca, on the grounds of illegal entry, but the 9th Circuit Court of Appeals deemed that the defendant was judged with bias and therefore reversed the lower court’s opinion. Judge Murguia wrote in the opinion that Raya-Vaca was the victim of bias and that the government had acted without due process of his rights and therefore the legal grounds for his ejection were not a solid legal basis for his removal.

=== Jesse James Andrews v. Ron Davis ===
In 2018, this en banc case held that Jesse Andrew did not receive proper constitutionally granted counsel during the first phase of the legal system. Initially, Andrews was raised in a segregated and poverty-stricken area of Mobile, Alabama at a school that has since been shuttered based on their violations of the Eighth Amendment. Because of this, Murguia wrote that mitigating information was not told to the court and therefore the death penalty should not be judged by those standards.

=== Grigoryan v. Barr ===
In 2019, Judge Murguia and the panel of judges ruled that the Board of Immigration Appeals violated the petitioners’ rights as immigrants. The violation concerned the actions that the government took that disabused the plaintiffs’ rights of due process before their status was terminated. The basis of this decision was supported by the fact that the Board did not provide “sufficient” information to the Plaintiffs. Judge Murguia wrote that even though they were in the U.S. for fourteen years, they were not judged fairly and given the proper information and denied their relief of deportation based on a single page that didn’t hold up under scrutiny.

=== Ashley Judd v. Harvey Weinstein ===
In the 2020 opinion written by Judge Murguia for the 9th Circuit Court of Appeals, she and her fellow judges overturned the lower court’s ruling since they deemed an incorrect application of statutes since her case was thrown out. Based on statute. Cal. Civ. Code § 51.9(a)(1)(F) (1996), the panel headed by Murguia ruled that their relationship constituted by the statute and therefore Weinstein was suited to use his leverage to allegedly abuse the plaintiff. This ruling and the following opinion reversed the ruling from the Supreme Court of California. This case was also instrumental to the cohesion of the Me Too movement as well.

== Personal life ==
Murguia's twin sister is noted civil rights leader Janet Murguía, while her older brother, Carlos Murguia, was a United States district judge.

== See also ==
- Barack Obama Supreme Court candidates
- List of first women lawyers and judges in Arizona
- List of Hispanic and Latino American jurists

== Sources ==
- Mary Murguia at Ballotpedia

Legal offices
New seat	Judge of the United States District Court for the District of Arizona; 2000–2011	Succeeded by Diane Humetewa
Preceded by Michael Daly Hawkins	Judge of the United States Court of Appeals for the Ninth Circuit; 2011–present	Incumbent
Preceded by Sidney R. Thomas	Chief Judge of the United States Court of Appeals for the Ninth Circuit; 2021–present	Incumbent
