= 2024 United States House of Representatives elections in Kansas =

- November 5, 2024

All 4 Kansas seats to the United States House of Representatives
	Majority party	Minority party
Party	Republican	Democratic
Last election	3	1
Seats won	3	1
Seat change	Steady	Steady
Popular vote	749,375	526,153
Percentage	57.39%	40.30%
Swing	▲0.54%	▼2.16%

Republican
50–60%
60–70%
70–80%
80–90%
>90%
Democratic
40–50%
50–60%
60–70%

The 2024 United States House of Representatives elections in Kansas were held on November 5, 2024, to elect the four U.S. representatives from the state of Kansas, one from each of the state's congressional districts. The elections coincided with the U.S. presidential election, other elections to the House of Representatives, elections to the United States Senate, and various state and local elections. The primary elections took place on August 6, 2024.

== Overview ==
=== Statewide ===
Party	Candi- dates	Votes		Seats		
Party	Candi- dates	No.	%	No.	+/–	%
Republican Party	4	749,375	57.39%	3	Steady	75%
Democratic Party	4	526,153	40.30%	1	Steady	25%
Libertarian Party	2	30,121	2.31%	0	Steady	0%
Total	10	1,305,649	100%	4	Steady	100%

Popular vote
Republican	57.39%
Democratic	40.30%
Libertarian	2.31%

House seats
Republican	75.00%
Democratic	25.00%

=== District ===
District	Republican		Democratic		Others		Total		Result
District	Votes	%	Votes	%	Votes	%	Votes	%	Result
District 1	210,493	69.14%	93,965	30.86%	0	0.00%	304,458	100.0%	Republican hold
District 2	172,847	57.09%	115,685	38.21%	14,229	4.70%	302,761	100.0%	Republican hold
District 3	167,570	42.60%	209,871	53.36%	15,892	4.04%	393,333	100.0%	Democratic hold
District 4	198,465	65.05%	106,632	34.95%	0	0.00%	305,097	100.0%	Republican hold
Total	749,375	57.39%	526,153	40.30%	30,121	2.31%	1,305,649	100.0%	

== District 1 ==
2024 Kansas's 1st congressional district election
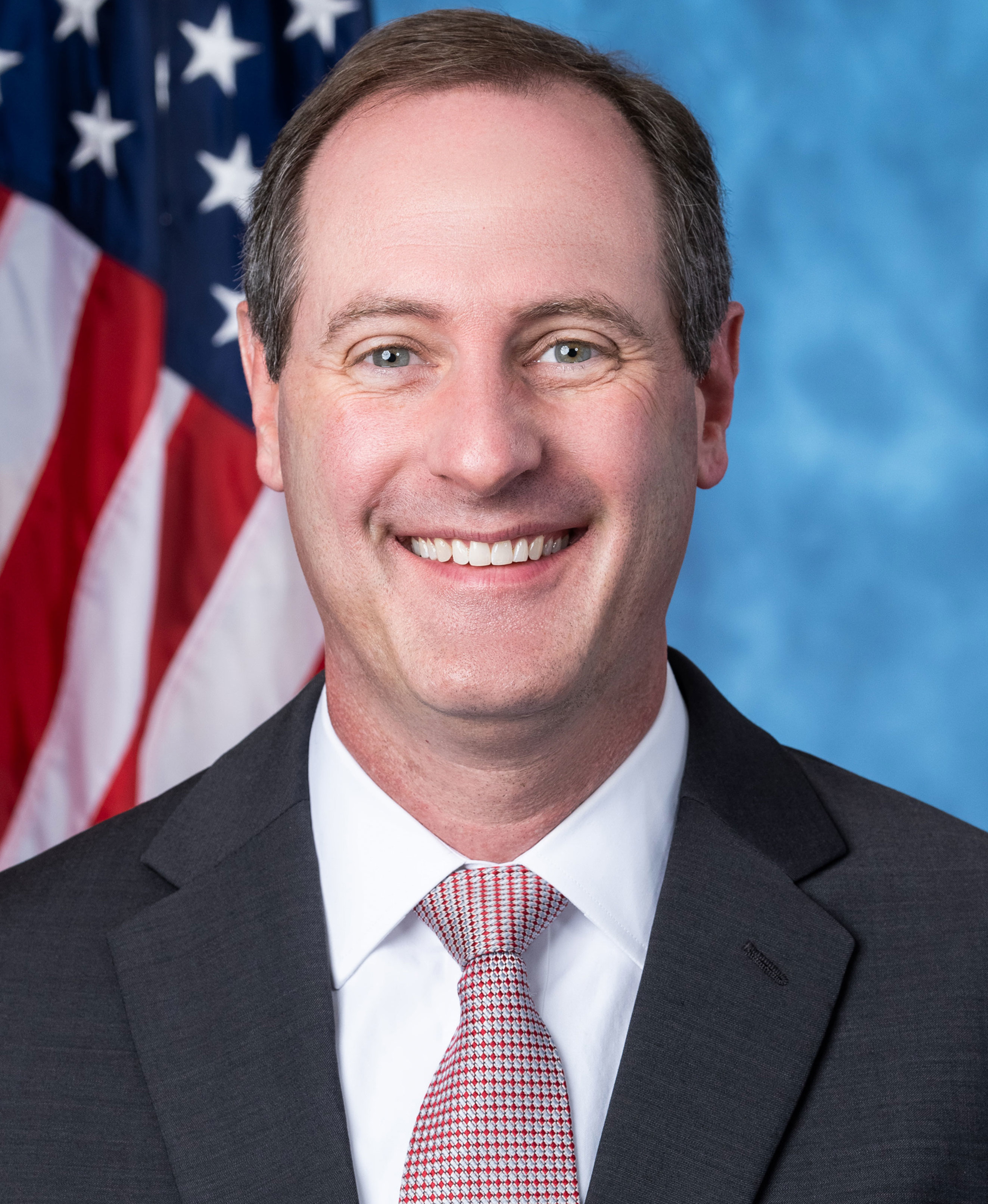

Nominee	Tracey Mann	Paul Buskirk
Party	Republican	Democratic
Popular vote	210,493	93,965
Percentage	69.1%	30.9%
- County results Mann: 50–60% 60–70% 70–80% 80–90% >90% Buskirk: 70–80%
U.S. Representative before election
Tracey Mann
Republican
Elected U.S. Representative
Tracey Mann
Republican

The incumbent was Republican Tracey Mann, who was re-elected with 67.7% of the vote in 2022.

=== Republican primary ===
==== Nominee ====
- Tracey Mann, incumbent U.S. representative

==== Eliminated in primary ====
- Eric Bloom

==== Endorsements ====
Tracey Mann

Organizations

- AIPAC
- National Right to Life Committee

==== Fundraising ====
Campaign finance reports as of March 31, 2024
Candidate	Raised	Spent	Cash on hand
Tracey Mann (R)	$779,506	$645,452	$1,231,605
Source: Federal Election Commission

==== Results ====
Republican primary results
Party	Candidate	Votes	%
Republican	Tracey Mann (incumbent)	57,219	87.5
Republican	Eric Bloom	8,148	12.5
Total votes		65,367	100.0

=== Democratic primary ===
==== Nominee ====
- Paul Buskirk, educator and candidate for U.S. Senate in 2022

==== Fundraising ====
Campaign finance reports as of December 31, 2023
Candidate	Raised	Spent	Cash on hand
Paul Buskirk (D)	$31,190 (Note: $15,000 of this total was self-funded by Buskirk.)	$23,833	$7,356
Source: Federal Election Commission

==== Results ====
Democratic primary results
Party	Candidate	Votes	%
Democratic	Paul Buskirk	15,240	100.0
Total votes		15,240	100.0

=== General election ===
==== Predictions ====
Source	Ranking	As of
Cook Political Report	Solid R	February 2, 2023
Inside Elections	Solid R	March 10, 2023
Sabato's Crystal Ball	Safe R	February 23, 2023
Elections Daily	Safe R	June 8, 2023
CNalysis	Solid R	November 16, 2023

==== Results ====
2024 Kansas's 1st congressional district election
Party	Candidate	Votes	%
Republican	Tracey Mann (incumbent)	210,493	69.1
Democratic	Paul Buskirk	93,965	30.9
Total votes		304,458	100.0
Republican hold			

== District 2 ==
2024 Kansas's 2nd congressional district election
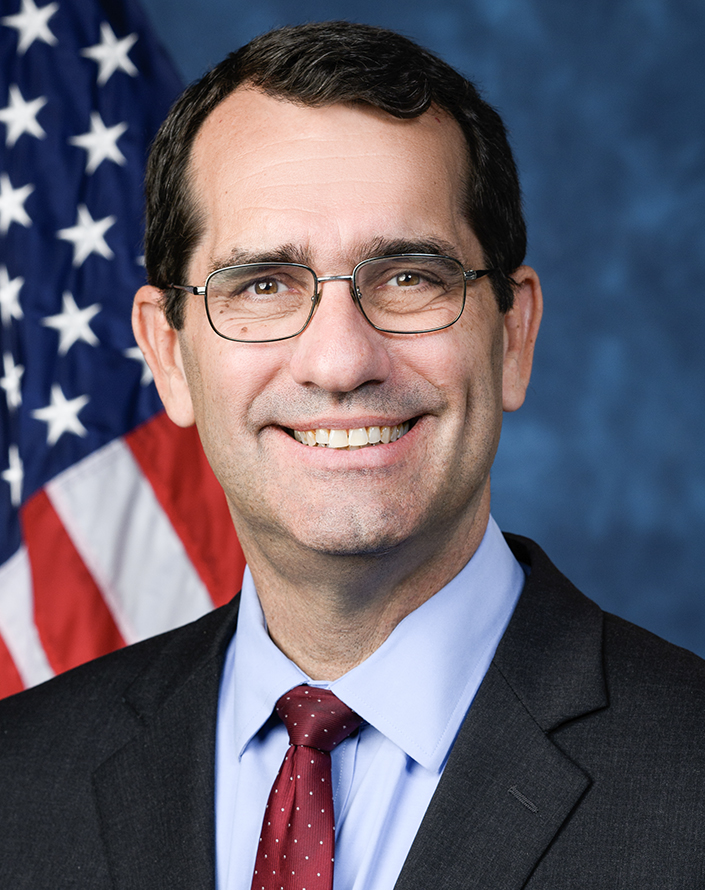

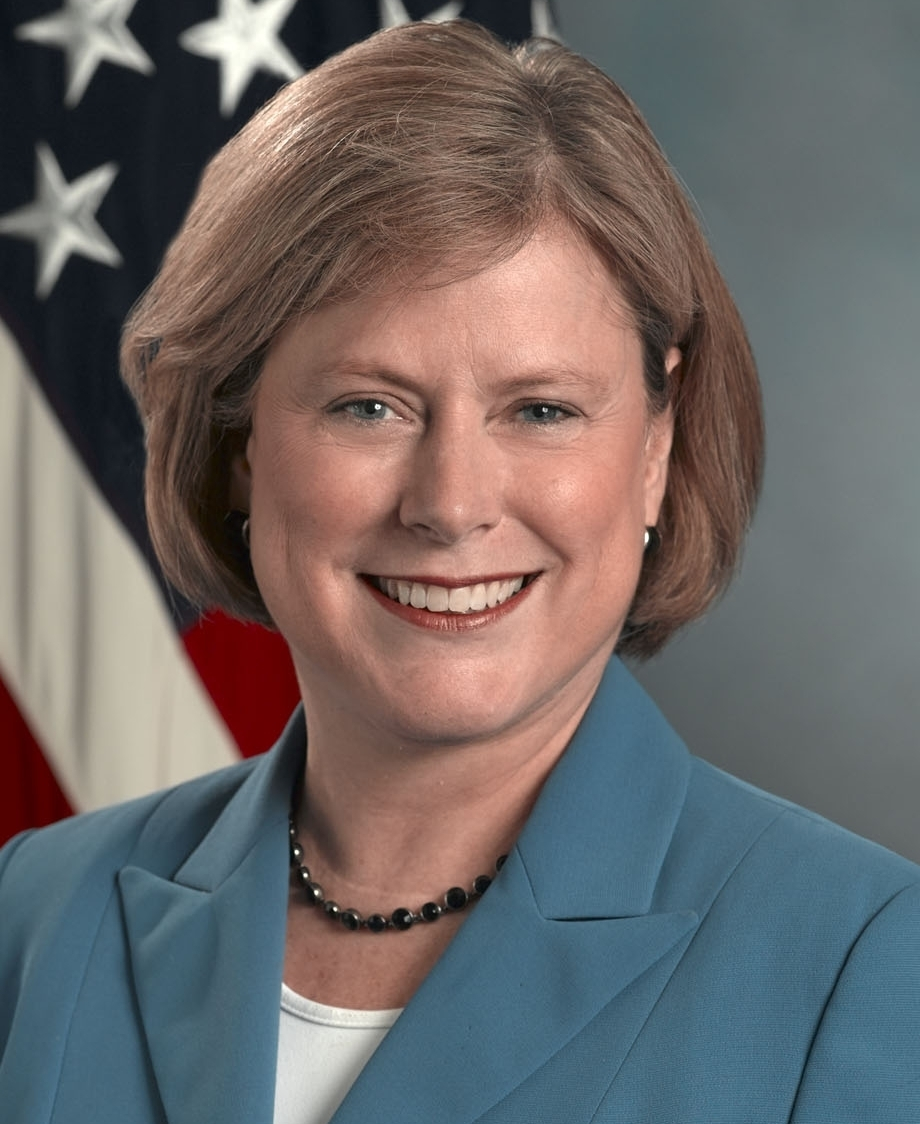
Nominee	Derek Schmidt	Nancy Boyda
Party	Republican	Democratic
Popular vote	172,847	115,685
Percentage	57.1%	38.2%
- County results Schmidt: 50–60% 60–70% 70–80% Boyda: 40–50% 60–70%
U.S. Representative before election
Jake LaTurner
Republican
Elected U.S. Representative
Derek Schmidt
Republican

The 2nd district stretches across much of eastern Kansas from Nebraska to Oklahoma, including the cities of Topeka, Emporia, Junction City and Pittsburg, as well as portions of Kansas City and Lawrence. The incumbent was Republican Jake LaTurner, who was re-elected with 57.6% of the vote in 2022.

=== Republican primary ===
==== Nominee ====
- Derek Schmidt, former Kansas attorney general (2011–2023) and nominee for governor in 2022

==== Eliminated in primary ====
- Jeff Kahrs, district director for incumbent Jake LaTurner
- Michael Ogle, U.S. Army veteran and convicted felon
- Shawn Tiffany, cattle farm owner
- Chad Young, boxing instructor

==== Declined ====
- Chris Croft, majority leader of the Kansas House of Representatives (2023–present) from the 8th district (2019–present)
- Steve Fitzgerald, former state senator from the 5th district (2013–2018) and candidate for this district in 2018
- Kris Kobach, Kansas attorney general (2023–present), former Kansas secretary of state (2011–2019), nominee for the 3rd district in 2004, nominee for governor in 2018, and candidate for U.S. Senate in 2020
- Jake LaTurner, incumbent U.S. representative
- Dennis Pyle, state senator from the 1st district (2005–present), candidate for this district in 2010 and 2018, and independent candidate for governor in 2022 (ran for re-election)
- Todd Thompson, Leavenworth County attorney (endorsed Schmidt)

==== Endorsements ====
Jeff Kahrs

U.S. senators

- Sam Brownback, former U.S. senator from Kansas (1996–2011) and former governor of Kansas (2011–2018)

U.S. representatives

- Jim Ryun, former U.S. representative from Kansas's 2nd congressional district (1996–2007)
- Todd Tiahrt, former U.S. representative from Kansas's 4th congressional district (1995–2011)
Derek Schmidt

Executive branch officials

- Donald Trump, 45th president of the United States (2017–2021)

Organizations

- Kansas Fraternal Order of Police
Jake LaTurner (declined)

Organizations

- AIPAC

==== Polling ====
Poll source	Date(s) administered	Sample size (Note: Key: A – all adults RV – registered voters LV – likely voters V – unclear)	Margin of error	Jeff Kahrs	Derek Schmidt	Shawn Tiffany	Undecided
co/efficient	May 13–14, 2024	1,517 (LV)	± 2.49%	4%	44%	3%	49%

Results by county Schmidt: 40–50%; 50–60%; 60–70%; 70–80%; Tiffany: 50–60%; 60–70%

==== Results ====
Republican primary results
Party	Candidate	Votes	%
Republican	Derek Schmidt	34,971	53.1
Republican	Shawn Tiffany	13,013	19.8
Republican	Jeff Kahrs	11,634	17.7
Republican	Chad Young	3,412	5.2
Republican	Michael Ogle	2,858	4.3
Total votes		65,888	100.0

=== Democratic primary ===
==== Nominee ====
- Nancy Boyda, former U.S. representative from this district (2007–2009)

==== Eliminated in primary ====
- Matt Kleinmann, community developer and former University of Kansas basketball player

==== Withdrawn ====
- Eli Woody, education consultant (ran for state house)

==== Results ====
Results by county Boyda: 50–60%; 60–70%; 70–80%; Kleinmann: 50–60%; 70–80%

Democratic primary results
Party	Candidate	Votes	%
Democratic	Nancy Boyda	13,571	51.7
Democratic	Matt Kleinmann	12,670	48.3
Total votes		26,241	100.0

=== General election ===
==== Predictions ====
Source	Ranking	As of
Cook Political Report	Solid R	February 2, 2023
Inside Elections	Solid R	March 10, 2023
Sabato's Crystal Ball	Safe R	February 23, 2023
Elections Daily	Safe R	June 8, 2023
CNalysis	Solid R	November 16, 2023

==== Endorsements ====
Nancy Boyda

Labor unions

- International Association of Sheet Metal, Air, Rail and Transportation Workers (SMART)

Newspapers

- The Kansas City Star

==== Results ====
2024 Kansas's 2nd congressional district election
Party	Candidate	Votes	%
Republican	Derek Schmidt	172,847	57.1
Democratic	Nancy Boyda	115,685	38.2
Libertarian	John Hauer	14,229	4.7
Total votes		302,761	100.0
Republican hold			

== District 3 ==
2024 Kansas's 3rd congressional district election
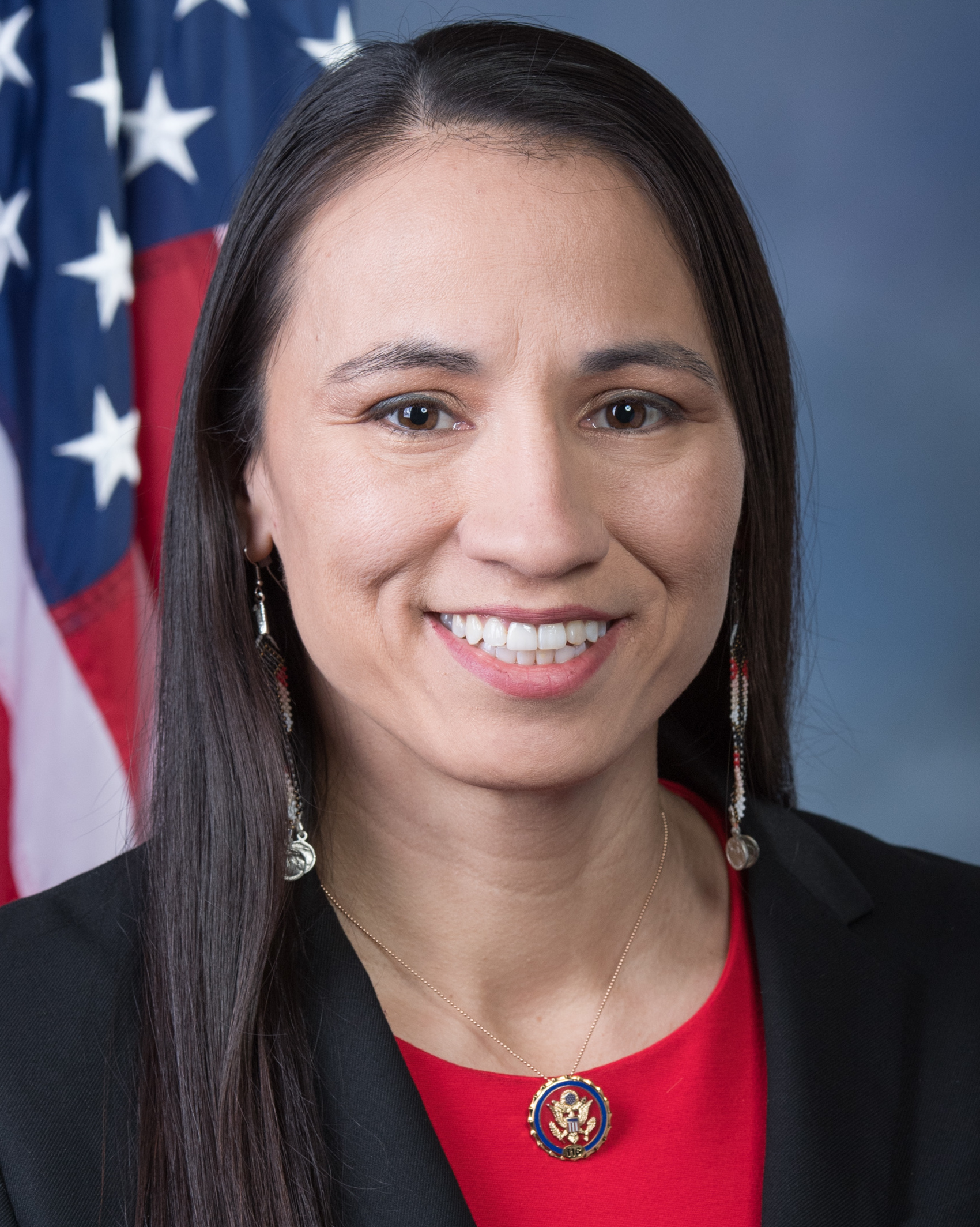

Nominee	Sharice Davids	Prasanth Reddy
Party	Democratic	Republican
Popular vote	209,871	167,570
Percentage	53.4%	42.6%
- County results Davids: 50–60% 60–70% Reddy: 50–60% 60–70%
U.S. Representative before election
Sharice Davids
Democratic
Elected U.S. Representative
Sharice Davids
Democratic

The 3rd district encompasses much of the Kansas City metropolitan area, including a portion of Kansas City, all of Johnson County, and several rural counties to the south and west. The incumbent was Democrat Sharice Davids, who was re-elected with 54.9% of the vote in 2022.

=== Democratic primary ===
==== Nominee ====
- Sharice Davids, incumbent U.S. representative

==== Endorsements ====
Sharice Davids

Statewide officials

- Gretchen Whitmer, governor of Michigan (2019–present)

Individuals

- Kelley Robinson, president of Human Rights Campaign

Organizations

- Brady PAC
- Democratic Majority for Israel
- EMILY's List
- End Citizens United
- Everytown for Gun Safety Action Fund
- Feminist Majority PAC
- Giffords
- Human Rights Campaign
- Humane Society Legislative Fund
- J Street PAC
- Jewish Democratic Council of America
- Joint Action Committee for Political Affairs
- League of Conservation Voters
- LGBTQ Victory Fund
- LPAC
- NARAL Pro-Choice America
- National Women's Political Caucus
- Natural Resources Defense Council
- Planned Parenthood Action Fund
- Population Connection Action Fund

Labor unions

- National Education Association

==== Fundraising ====
Campaign finance reports as of March 31, 2024
Candidate	Raised	Spent	Cash on hand
Sharice Davids (D)	$3,018,352	$934,497	$2,147,479
Source: Federal Election Commission

==== Results ====
Democratic primary results
Party	Candidate	Votes	%
Democratic	Sharice Davids (incumbent)	37,837	100.0
Total votes		37,837	100.0

=== Republican primary ===
==== Nominee ====
- Prasanth Reddy, oncologist and healthcare executive

==== Eliminated in primary ====
- Karen Crnkovich, plumbing and ventilation business owner

==== Withdrawn ====
- Jonathon Westbrook, member of the Kansas African American Affairs Commission and former White House Fellow

==== Endorsements ====
Prasanth Reddy

U.S. representatives

- Steve Scalise, LA-01 (2008–present)
- Elise Stefanik, U.S. representative from New York's 21st congressional district (2015–present) and chair of the House Republican Conference

Organizations

- Congressional Leadership Fund

==== Fundraising ====
Campaign finance reports as of March 31, 2024
Candidate	Raised	Spent	Cash on hand
Karen Crnkovich (R)	$120,481	$68,865	$51,615
Prasanth Reddy (R)	$882,491 (Note: $57,500 of this total was self-funded by Reddy.)	$320,772	$561,718
Source: Federal Election Commission

==== Results ====
Republican primary results by county: Reddy: 50–60%; Crnkovich: 50–60%; 60–70%

Republican primary results
Party	Candidate	Votes	%
Republican	Prasanth Reddy	26,573	53.1
Republican	Karen Crnkovich	23,510	46.9
Total votes		50,083	100.0

=== General election ===
==== Predictions ====
Source	Ranking	As of
Cook Political Report	Likely D	February 2, 2023
Inside Elections	Solid D	October 10, 2024
Sabato's Crystal Ball	Likely D	February 23, 2023
Elections Daily	Safe D	June 8, 2023
CNalysis	Very Likely D	November 16, 2023

==== Results ====
2024 Kansas's 3rd congressional district election
Party	Candidate	Votes	%
Democratic	Sharice Davids (incumbent)	209,871	53.4
Republican	Prasanth Reddy	167,570	42.6
Libertarian	Steve Roberts	15,892	4.0
Total votes		393,333	100.0
Democratic hold			

== District 4 ==
2024 Kansas's 4th congressional district election
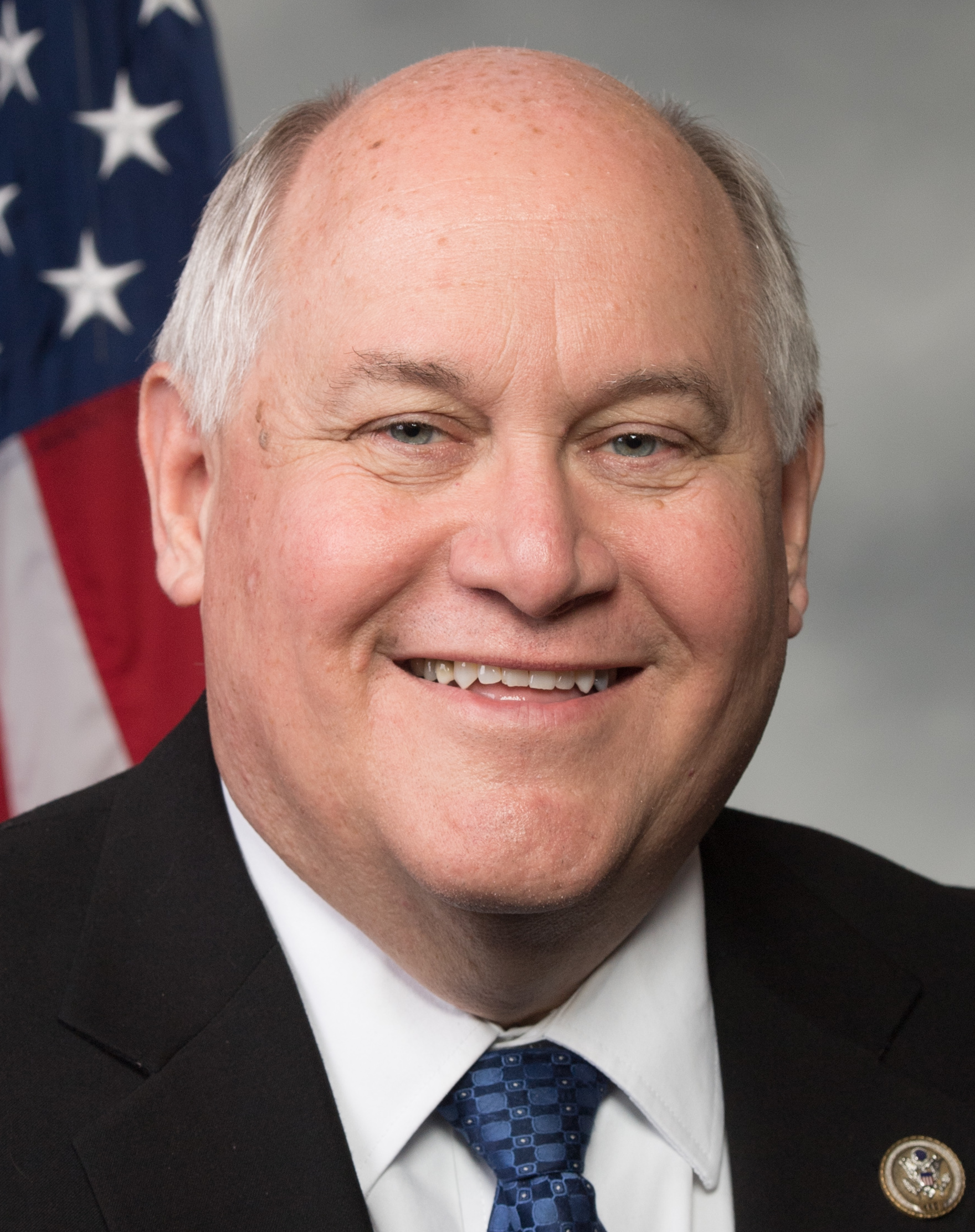

Nominee	Ron Estes	Esau Freeman
Party	Republican	Democratic
Popular vote	198,465	106,632
Percentage	65.0%	35.0%
- County results Estes: 60–70% 70–80% 80–90%
U.S. Representative before election
Ron Estes
Republican
Elected U.S. Representative
Ron Estes
Republican

The incumbent was Republican Ron Estes, who was re-elected with 63.3% of the vote in 2022.

=== Republican primary ===
==== Nominee ====
- Ron Estes, incumbent U.S. representative

==== Endorsements ====
Ron Estes

Organizations

- AIPAC
- National Right to Life Committee

==== Fundraising ====
Campaign finance reports as of March 31, 2024
Candidate	Raised	Spent	Cash on hand
Ron Estes (R)	$1,416,451	$868,007	$1,492,016
Source: Federal Election Commission

==== Results ====
Republican primary results
Party	Candidate	Votes	%
Republican	Ron Estes (incumbent)	40,100	100.0
Total votes		40,100	100.0

=== Democratic primary ===
==== Nominee ====
- Esau Freeman, home painting contractor and candidate for this district in 2012

==== Fundraising ====
Campaign finance reports as of March 31, 2024
Candidate	Raised	Spent	Cash on hand
Esau Freeman (D)	$31,700	$20,155	$11,738
Source: Federal Election Commission

==== Results ====
Democratic primary results
Party	Candidate	Votes	%
Democratic	Esau Freeman	10,641	100.0
Total votes		10,641	100.0

=== General election ===
==== Predictions ====
Source	Ranking	As of
Cook Political Report	Solid R	February 2, 2023
Inside Elections	Solid R	March 10, 2023
Sabato's Crystal Ball	Safe R	February 23, 2023
Elections Daily	Safe R	June 8, 2023
CNalysis	Solid R	November 16, 2023

==== Results ====
2024 Kansas's 4th congressional district election
Party	Candidate	Votes	%
Republican	Ron Estes (incumbent)	198,465	65.0
Democratic	Esau Freeman	106,632	35.0
Total votes		305,097	100.0
Republican hold			

== See also ==
- 2024 Kansas elections
- 2024 United States House of Representatives elections
- 2024 Kansas House of Representatives election
