= Senator Pyle =

Senator Pyle may refer to:

- Dennis Pyle (born 1961), Kansas State Senate
- Gladys Pyle (1890–1989), U.S. Senator from South Dakota
