= Nancy Boyda =

American chemist and politician (born 1955)

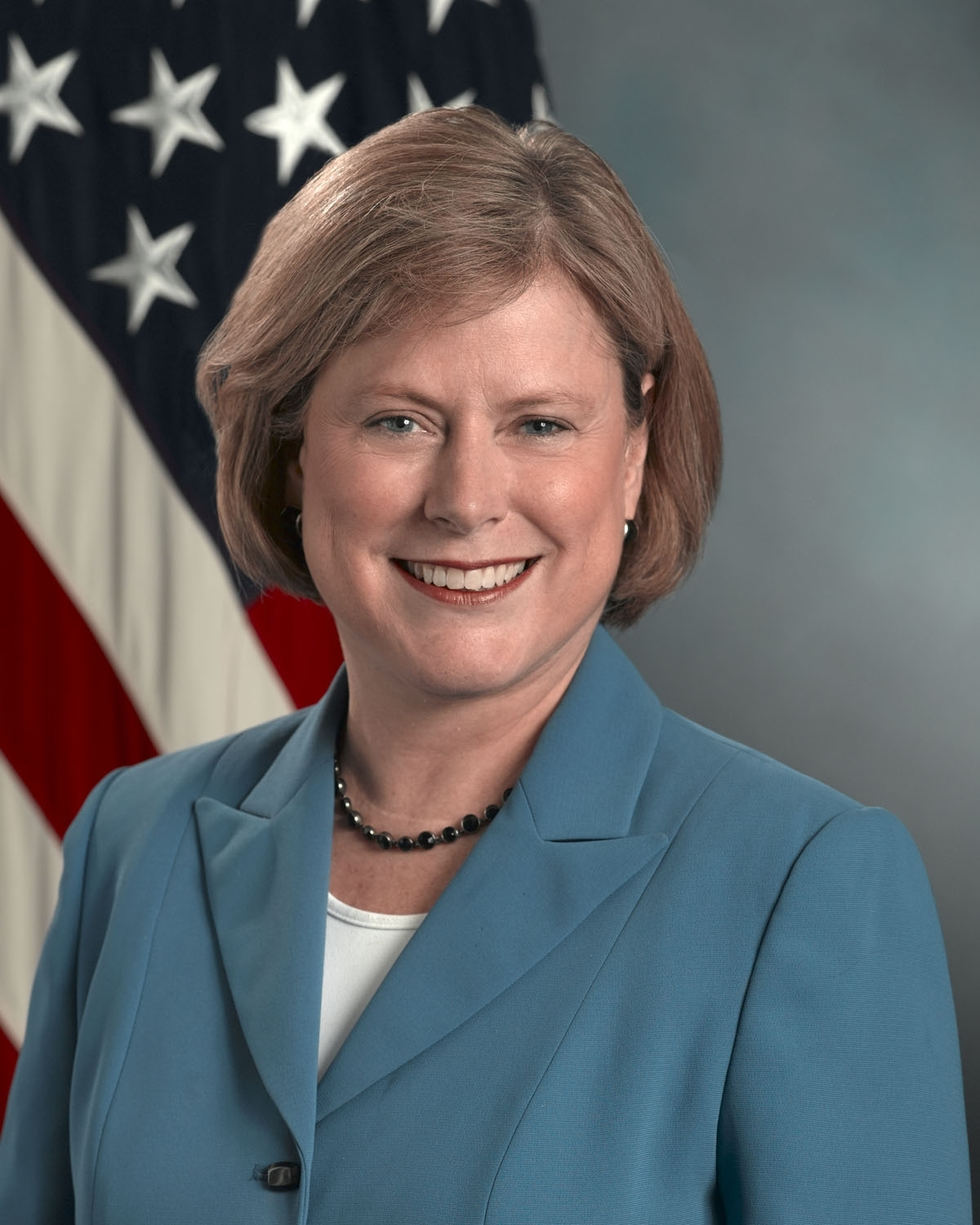
- Official portrait, 2009

Member of the U.S. House of Representatives from Kansas's 2nd district
- In office January 3, 2007 – January 3, 2009
- Preceded by: Jim Ryun
- Succeeded by: Lynn Jenkins

Personal details
- Born: August 2, 1955 (age 71) St. Louis, Missouri, U.S.
- Party: Democratic (2003–Present); Republican (before 2003)
- Spouse: Steve Boyda
- Education: William Jewell College (BS)

Nancy Boyda (born August 2, 1955) is an American chemist and politician. She is a former Democratic U.S. representative for Kansas's 2nd congressional district, serving from 2007 to 2009. On November 4, 2008, Boyda was defeated for re-election to a second term by state Treasurer Lynn Jenkins. She was the Democratic nominee for the seat in the 2024 election, where she was defeated by Republican candidate Derek Schmidt.

== Early life, education, and career ==
Boyda graduated with honors from William Jewell College in Liberty, Missouri, where she received dual degrees in chemistry and education. She began her career in 1978 working as an analytical chemist and field inspector. Boyda grew up in a Republican family and later became a Democrat in 2003.

== U.S. House of Representatives ==
=== Elections ===
2004

In 2004 she ran against Republican incumbent U.S. Congressman Jim Ryun in Kansas's 2nd District. Boyda criticized Ryun's support for school vouchers and his lack of support for public schools. She said she had left the Republican Party because it had become too conservative. Ryun criticized her for taking part in protests against the Iraq War. Boyda spent $1.1 million on her campaign, $300,000 of it her own money. Ryun spent $1.2 million. George W. Bush carried the district 59%-39% and Ryun defeated Boyda 56%-41%. The only county Boyda had won during the election was Crawford.

2006

Boyda challenged Ryun again in 2006. The district was low on both national parties' political radars. Boyda was helped by the successful re-election bid of Governor Kathleen Sebelius, who won 57% to 40%. Ryun was a strongly conservative Republican and the Republican Party of Kansas had been rife with infighting between conservatives and moderates; moderate Republicans seem to have defected to both Sebelius and Boyda. There was also the issue of Ryun's purchase of a Washington, D.C. townhouse from Tom DeLay associates at a price well below market value. She defeated Ryun by 51% to 47% in an upset.

2008

In January 2007, National Republican Congressional Committee Chairman Tom Cole announced that the NRCC intended to target Boyda in 2008. Ryun announced that he would try to get his old seat back, and Republican leaders reportedly assured him that he would win. On April 4, 2007, State Treasurer Lynn Jenkins officially announced she would run in the Republican primary. She defeated State Senator Dennis Pyle in the primary.

Boyda and Jenkins were opposed in the general election by Libertarian Party candidate Robert Garrard and Reform Party candidate Leslie Martin. Boyda announced that, unlike in 2006, she would not seek assistance from the Democratic Congressional Campaign Committee for her 2008 campaign. She said that "Kansas voters should control Kansas campaigns" and that Kansans should be able to "run our election without Washington interference". The National Republican Congressional Committee spent heavily on behalf of Jenkins, who defeated Boyda 51% to 46%. In April 2009, DCCC Chairman Chris Van Hollen said that Boyda left him a message saying that she regretted turning down the organisation's assistance and asked Van Hollen to play the message to any vulnerable Democrat who was considering turning down the committee's assistance. Van Hollen said that Boyda "has been very clear about the fact that she made a mistake... she clearly felt that not participating [with the DCCC's help] was a good part of the reason she failed."

=== Tenure ===
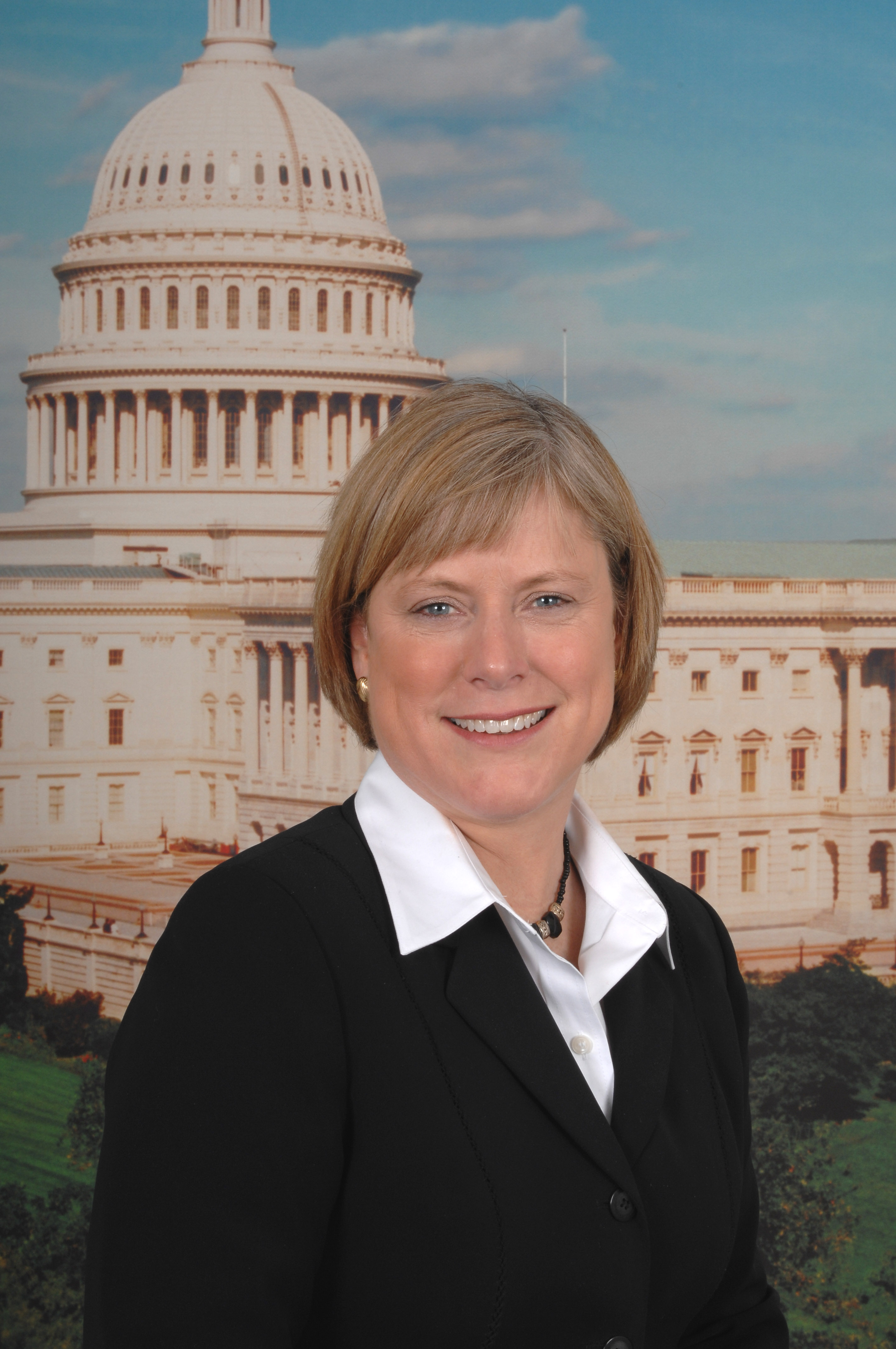
Boyda's official portrait for the 110th Congress

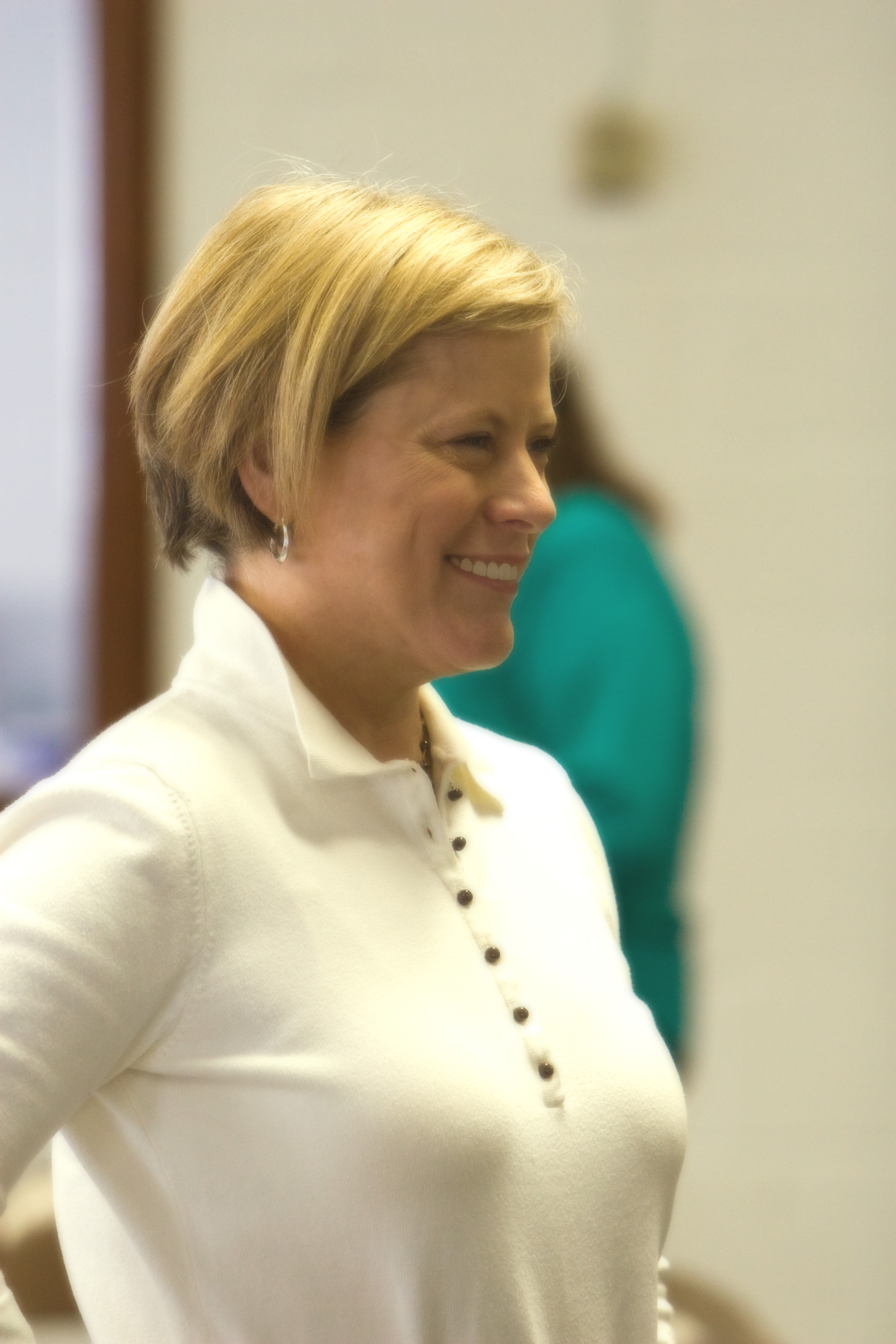
Nancy Boyda at a town hall meeting

Boyda, as a freshman, introduced a bill, H.R. 476, to deny pensions to members of Congress convicted of bribery, conspiracy or perjury charges. The Bill passed in the House of Representatives on January 23, 2007, by a vote of 431–0. Boyda also applied to join the House Blue Dog Coalition, a caucus of conservative Democratic representatives. She was unable to join as adding her would have put the Blue Dogs over their membership limit of 47.

On May 10, 2007, Boyda voted against H.R. 2237, a measure, "to provide for the redeployment of United States Armed Forces and defense contractors from Iraq." She continued to support gradual troop withdrawal while funding troops until they return.

Armed Services Committee hearing in July 2007

Congresswoman Boyda left a congressional hearing while a retired Army general testified about US progress in Iraq. Retired Army General Jack Keane had testified that since the troop surge began, U.S. forces "are on the offensive and we have the momentum." He also said security has improved in every neighborhood and district in and around Baghdad, and that "cafes, pool halls, coffee houses that I visited are full of people". Boyda said she left the House Armed Services Committee hearing during the testimony of General Keane because "there was only so much that you could take," and continued to say she felt Keane's picture of the situation in Iraq was inappropriately "rosy."

Her chief of staff Shanan Guinn said, "She was frustrated with how the administration is handling the war, that no one wants to have a real conversation about ways to move forward and our brave men and women overseas are being played like a political ping pong ball."

Boyda later told the Manhattan (Kan.) Mercury, that she did not "walk out" of the meeting. Instead, she "stepped into a little room" adjacent to the meeting for five minutes, then returned. She hoped to draw a distinction between politely excusing herself and storming out of the room.

=== Committee assignments ===
- Armed Services Committee
  - Subcommittee on Military Personnel
  - Subcommittee on Readiness
- Agriculture Committee
  - Subcommittee on Conservation, Credit, Energy and Research
  - Subcommittee on Department Operations, Oversight, Nutrition and Forestry
  - Subcommittee on General Farm Commodities and Risk Management

== Post-congressional career ==
Following her term in Congress, Boyda was named by President Barack Obama as the Deputy Assistant Secretary of Defense for Manpower and Personnel at The Pentagon, and was sworn into the position on July 20, 2009.

== 2020 U.S. Senate campaign ==
It was reported in April 2019 that Boyda was exploring a candidacy for the Kansas Senate election in 2020. She subsequently announced her candidacy to seek the Democratic nomination on July 1, 2019. While campaigning, she argued said campaign finance practices and gerrymandering are big reasons why politicians don't "work across the aisle," and she said her campaign aims to break gridlock.

Boyda withdrew from the race saying she would begin a non-profit to break partisan divide as opposed to running for the Senate.

== 2024 House campaign ==
Boyda filed to run for Kansas's 2nd District for the 2024 elections. She defeated Matt Kleinmann in the Democratic primary, and faced former state Attorney General Derek Schmidt in the general election.

Boyda has said her priorities are bipartisan immigration reform, tax cuts for working class individuals and campaign finance reform. Like in her 2020 Senate campaign, she has expressed her desire to try to bridge the divide among Kansans politically. In the general election, Boyda was defeated by Schmidt by 57,162 votes.

== Political positions ==
In 2007, Boyda talked with protestors during a public appearance in Lawrence, Kansas after she voted to provide additional funds for America's troops serving in the Iraq War. She explained her vote by saying she would support the troops, and "I am going to do what I can to bring those troops home as soon as possible." She continued, "It's the Republican side of the aisle that’s holding things up."

In 2008, Boyda opposed a constitutional amendment to ban gay marriage during a debate with her general election opponent and said that lawmakers should avoid "tampering" with the U.S. Constitution, in reference to a push to amend the Constitution to ban marriage equality. During that period, she also stated, "I do believe that marriage is between a man and a woman" and voted with 39 other Democrats in 2008 for an amendment that pulled back domestic partner benefits to public employees in the District of Columbia.

During her 2024 campaign, Boyda expressed strong support for LGBTQIA rights, including marriage equality, laws that protect the community from employment discrimination, housing and public accommodation discrimination and equal access to health care. She also shared that she is the parent of a gay son and is concerned with bullying and violence toward LGBTQIA people saying, "I am deeply concerned with increased bullying and violence toward the community. If elected, I will consistently vote to respect and protect the right to privacy no matter what our current activist Supreme Court does."

== Personal life ==
Boyda was married to Steve Boyda, a Marine Corps veteran and police officer. She has two children and one granddaughter. She lives on a small farm outside of Baldwin City, Kansas.

== Electoral history ==
Kansas's 2nd Congressional District Election (2004)
Party	Candidate	Votes	%
Republican	Jim Ryun*	165,325	56.15
Democratic	Nancy Boyda	121,532	41.28
Libertarian	Dennis Hawver	7,579	2.57
Total votes		294,436	100.00
Republican hold			

Kansas's 2nd Congressional District Election (2006)
Party	Candidate	Votes	%
Democratic	Nancy Boyda	111,759	50.60
Republican	Jim Ryun*	104,128	47.15
Reform	Roger Tucker	4,980	2.26
Total votes		220,867	100.00
Democratic gain from Republican			

Kansas's 2nd Congressional District Election (2008)
Party	Candidate	Votes	%
Republican	Lynn Jenkins	155,532	50.61
Democratic	Nancy Boyda*	142,013	46.21
Reform	Leslie Martin	5,080	1.65
Libertarian	Robert Garrard	4,683	1.52
Total votes		262,027	100.00
Republican gain from Democratic			

Kansas's 2nd Congressional District Election (2024)
Party	Candidate	Votes	%
Republican	Derek Schmidt	172,847	57.1
Democratic	Nancy Boyda	115,685	38.2
Libertarian	John Hauer	14,229	4.7
Total votes		302,761	100.0
Republican hold			

== See also ==
- Women in the United States House of Representatives

U.S. House of Representatives
Preceded by Jim Ryun	Member of the U.S. House of Representatives from Kansas's 2nd congressional district 2007–2009	Succeeded by Lynn Jenkins
U.S. order of precedence (ceremonial)
Preceded by Vince Snowbarger as Former U.S. Representative	Order of precedence of the United States as Former U.S. Representative	Succeeded by Steve Watkins as Former U.S. Representative
