= Craig Bowser =

American politician

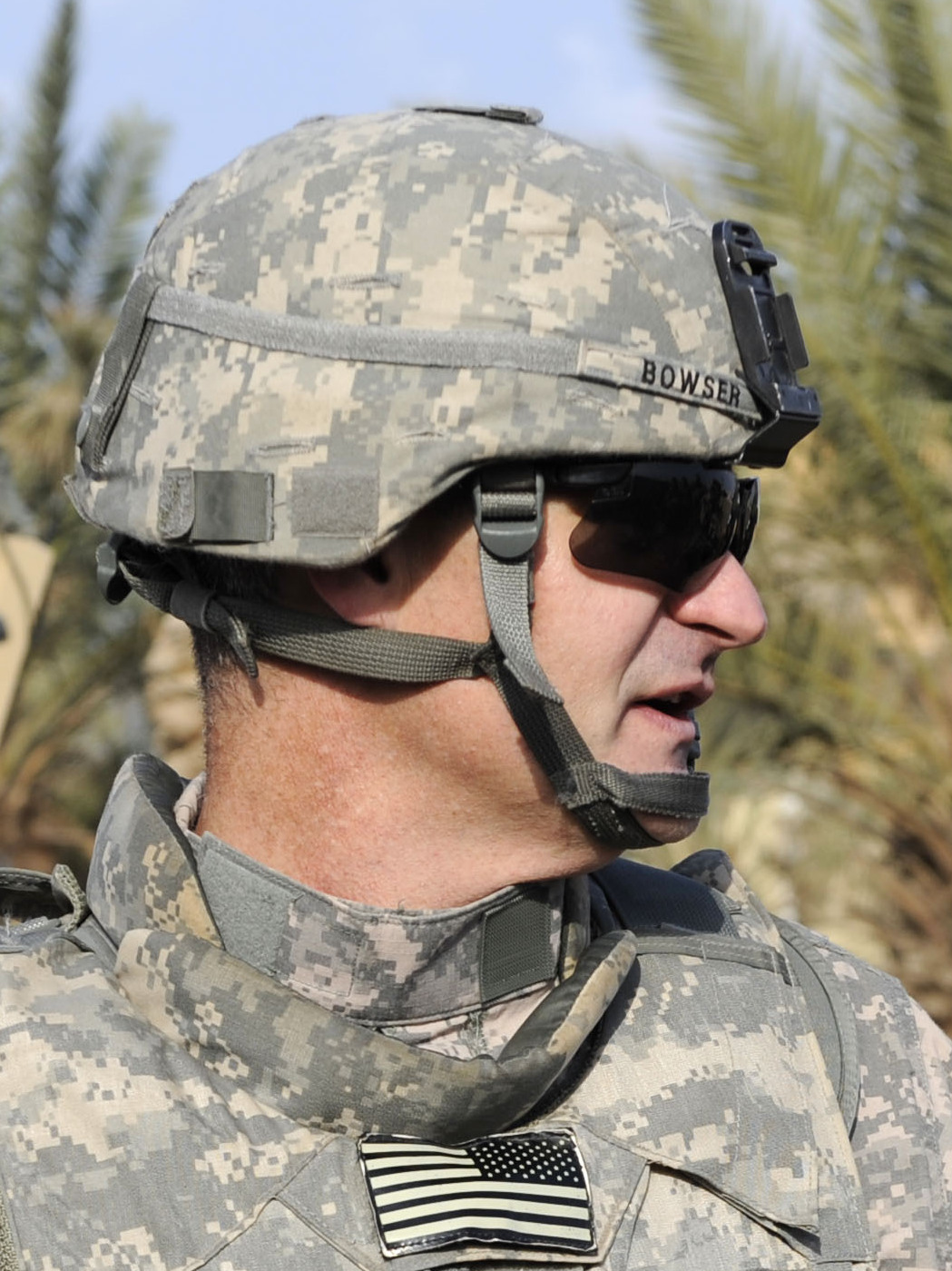
- Bowser in 2009

Member of the Kansas Senate from the 1st district
- Incumbent
- Assumed office January 13, 2025
- Preceded by: Dennis Pyle

Personal details
- Born: October 16, 1965 (age 61) Warrensburg, Missouri, U.S.
- Party: Republican
- Spouse: Erin
- Education: Emporia State University (B); Washburn University (MBA); Henley-Putnam School of Strategic Security (PhD)

Military service
- Branch: United States Army
- Years of service: 1991-2015
- Unit: U.S. Army Reserve
- Awards: Meritorious Honor Award

Craig Bowser is an American politician serving as a member of the Kansas Senate from the 1st district. A member of the Republican Party, he defeated incumbent senator Dennis Pyle, who served as an independent from 2022 to 2024, in the party's primary election in the 2024 Kansas Senate election. He was previously an information security officer with the State of Kansas and served in the U.S. Army Reserve.

== Early life and education ==
Bowser was born in Warrensburg, Missouri, and raised by a single mother on a ranch near Holton, Kansas. After graduating from Holton High School, he earned a bachelor’s degree from Emporia State University and an MBA from Washburn University. After leaving the U.S. Army Reserves, Bowser used his G.I. Bill to earn his doctorate in strategic security from the Henley-Putnam School of Strategic Security.

== Career ==
Bowser served in the U.S. Army Reserves from 1991 to 2015 as a civil affairs officer and helped facilitate elections in Iraq in 2005. He was awarded the Meritorious Honor Award from the U.S. Department of State during one of his combat tours.

In 2018, governor Jeff Colyer appointed Bowser to the Kansas Commission on Emergency Planning and Response. He served as CEO of SAVE Farms, a nonprofit farm based in Manhattan training veterans for agribusiness careers.

He currently works for the State of Kansas as an information security officer. In 2023, emails surrounding the 2023 police raid of the Marion County Record showed Bowser was on the criminal investigation team for the raid.

== Kansas Senate ==
=== Elections ===
==== 2020 ====
In 2020, Bowser challenged incumbent Democrat Tom Hawk for the 22nd district. He opposed Medicaid expansion and government spending, instead emphasizing increasing the state's revenue through medical cannabis, sports betting, and privatizing the Kansas Turnpike. He was defeated in the general election with 48.7% of the vote.

==== 2024 ====
In 2024, Bowser announced he would challenge incumbent state senator Dennis Pyle in the Republican primary election. Pyle had previously served as an independent from 2022 to 2024 and ran for governor as one in the 2022 election, irking the Kansas Republican Party's leadership. Bowser defeated state representative John Eplee and Pyle in the primary election with 40.6% of the vote. He was unopposed in the general election.

=== Tenure ===
In 2025, Bowser supported a bill nullifying racial covenants on land owned by Wichita State University.

== Electoral history ==
=== 2020 ===
2020 Kansas Senate election, District 22
Primary election
Party	Candidate	Votes	%
Republican	Craig Bowser	5,232	60.5
Republican	Bryan Pruitt	3,411	39.5
Total votes		8,643	100
General election
Democratic	Tom Hawk (incumbent)	15,687	51.3
Republican	Craig Bowser	14,911	48.7
Total votes		30,598	100
Democratic hold			

=== 2024 ===
2024 Kansas Senate election, District 1
Primary election
Party	Candidate	Votes	%
Republican	Craig Bowser	5,069	40.64
Republican	John Eplee	4,543	36.43
Republican	Dennis Pyle (incumbent)	2,860	22.93
Total votes		12,472	100.00
General election
Republican	Craig Bowser	29,530	100.00
Total votes		29,530	100.00
Republican hold			

== Personal life ==
Bowser and his wife, Erin, live on their farm near Holton, Kansas.
