= Patrick Schmidt (politician) =

American politician

Member of the Kansas Senate from the 19th district
- Incumbent
- Assumed office January 13, 2025
- Preceded by: Dennis Pyle

Personal details
- Born: May 21, 1991 (age 35)
- Party: Democratic
- Spouse: Megan Walden
- Education: Tufts University (BA)

Patrick Connor Schmidt is an American politician serving as a member of the Kansas Senate from the 19th district.

== Early life and education ==
Schmidt grew up in Overland Park, Kansas. He earned a bachelor’s degree from Tufts University in 2013.

== Career ==
Schmidt served as an intelligence officer in the U.S. Navy and U.S. Naval Reserves and worked at the Pentagon.

=== 2022 U.S. House campaign ===
In 2022, Schmidt ran for the U.S. House of Representatives in Kansas' 2nd district challenging incumbent Republican Jake LaTurner. The January 6 United States Capitol attack motivated him to enter politics. He criticized LaTurner for his vote to overturn the results of the 2020 presidential election and for his opposition to abortion rights. LaTurner won with 57% to Schmidt's 42% of the vote.

== Kansas Senate ==
=== Elections ===
After redistricting made the 19th District of the Kansas Senate a safely Democratic seat, Schmidt announced his candidacy for the 2024 election. He easily defeated state House Minority Leader Vic Miller and ShaMecha King Simms in the primary.

=== Tenure ===
In 2025, Schmidt crticized Republicans for advancing legislation which would eliminate property taxes for private jets and yachts, banning gender-affirming care for minors, and compell teachers to not use minors preferred name or pronouns instead of tax relief legislation. He broke from his party and voted to support a constitutional amendment referendum that limits taxable property valuations from increasing by more than 3% annually.

== Electoral history ==
=== 2022 ===
2022 Kansas's 2nd congressional district election
Primary election
Party	Candidate	Votes	%
Democratic	Patrick Schmidt	54,439	100.0
Total votes		54,439	100.0
General election
Republican	Jake LaTurner (incumbent)	134,506	57.6
Democratic	Patrick Schmidt	98,852	42.4
Total votes		233,358	100.0
Republican hold			

=== 2024 ===
2024 Kansas Senate election, District 19
Primary election
Party	Candidate	Votes	%
Democratic	Patrick Schmidt	2,591	53.01
Democratic	Vic Miller	1,681	34.39
Democratic	ShaMecha King Simms	616	12.60
Total votes		4,888	100.00
General election
Democratic	Patrick Schmidt	16,784	64.55
Republican	Tyler Wible	9,216	35.45
Total votes		26,000	100.00
Democratic win (new boundaries)			

== Personal life ==
Schmidt resides in Topeka, Kansas, with his wife, Megan Walden.
