= 2024 Kansas Senate election =

- November 5, 2024

All 40 seats in the Kansas Senate 21 seats needed for a majority
	Majority party	Minority party
Leader	Ty Masterson	Dinah Sykes
Party	Republican	Democratic
Leader's seat	16th district	21st district
Seats before	29	11
Seats after	31	9
Seat change	▲2	▼2
Popular vote	756,351	484,632
Percentage	60.43%	38.72%
Swing	▼2.68%	▲1.83%
- Republican gain Democratic gain Republican hold Democratic hold 50–60% 60–70% 70–80% 80–90% >90% 50–60% 60–70% 70–80% >90%
President of the Senate before election
Ty Masterson
Republican
Elected President of the Senate
Ty Masterson
Republican

The 2024 Kansas Senate election was held on November 5, 2024, alongside the 2024 United States elections. All 40 seats in the Kansas Senate were up for election and the primary was held on August 6, 2024.

== Retirements ==
Eleven incumbents did not seek re-election.

=== Republicans ===
- District 17: Jeff Longbine retired.
- District 18: Kristen O'Shea retired.
- District 23: Robert S. Olson retired.
- District 26: Dan Kerschen retired.
- District 31: Carolyn McGinn retired.
- District 33: Alicia Straub retired to run for Barton County Clerk.
- District 34: Mark Steffen retired.
- District 35: Rick Wilborn retired to run for State House.
- District 37: Molly Baumgardner retired.
- District 39: John Doll retired.

=== Democrats ===
- District 3: Tom Holland retired.

== Incumbents defeated ==
=== In primary election ===
One incumbent senator, a Republican, was defeated in the August 6 primary election.

==== Republicans ====
- District 1: Dennis Pyle lost renomination to Craig Bowser.

=== In general election ===
==== Democrats ====
- District 5: Jeff Pittman was defeated by Republican Jeff Klemp.
- District 22: Usha Reddi was defeated by Republican Brad Starnes.

== Predictions ==
Source	Ranking	As of
Sabato's Crystal Ball	Likely R	October 23, 2024

== Results summary ==
Summary of the November 5, 2024 Kansas Senate election results
Party	Candidates	Votes		Seats				
Party	Candidates	No.	%	Before	Up	Won	After	+/–
Republican	37	756,351	60.43%	29	29	31	31	▲2
Democratic	34	484,632	38.72%	11	11	9	9	▼2
Libertarian	2	8,663	0.69%	0	0	0	0	Steady
United Kansas	1	2,006	0.16%	0	0	0	0	Steady
Total		1,251,652	100.0%	40	40	40	40	Steady

Popular vote
Republican	60.43%
Democratic	38.72%

Senate seats
Republican	77.5%
Democratic	22.5%

=== Close races ===
Districts where the margin of victory was under 10%:

1. District 5, 0.1% (flip)
2. District 22, 1.82% (flip)
3. District 11, 4.34%
4. District 10, 4.78%
5. District 23, 4.78%
6. District 35, 5.54%

=== Summary by district ===
† - Incumbent not seeking re-election.

District	Incumbent	Party	Elected Senator	Party
1st	Dennis Pyle	Rep	Craig Bowser	Rep
2nd	Marci Francisco	Dem	Marci Francisco	Dem
3rd	Tom Holland†	Dem	Rick Kloos	Rep
3rd	Rick Kloos (Note: Redistricted from the 19th district.)	Rep	Rick Kloos	Rep
4th	David Haley	Dem	David Haley	Dem
5th	Jeff Pittman	Dem	Jeff Klemp	Rep
6th	Pat Pettey	Dem	Pat Pettey	Dem
7th	Ethan Corson	Dem	Ethan Corson	Dem
8th	Cindy Holscher	Dem	Cindy Holscher	Dem
9th	Beverly Gossage	Rep	Beverly Gossage	Rep
10th	Mike Thompson	Rep	Mike Thompson	Rep
11th	Kellie Warren	Rep	Kellie Warren	Rep
12th	Caryn Tyson	Rep	Caryn Tyson	Rep
13th	Tim Shallenburger (Note: Appointed in 2023 to replace incumbent Richard Hilderbrand.)	Rep	Tim Shallenburger	Rep
14th	Michael Fagg	Rep	Michael Fagg	Rep
15th	Virgil Peck Jr.	Rep	Virgil Peck Jr.	Rep
16th	Ty Masterson	Rep	Ty Masterson	Rep
17th	Jeff Longbine†	Rep	Mike Argabright	Rep
18th	Kristen O'Shea†	Rep	Kenny Titus	Rep
19th	New Seat		Patrick Schmidt	Dem
20th	Brenda Dietrich	Rep	Brenda Dietrich	Rep
21st	Dinah Sykes	Dem	Dinah Sykes	Dem
22nd	Usha Reddi (Note: Appointed in 2023 to replace incumbent Tom Hawk.)	Dem	Brad Starnes	Rep
23rd	Robert S. Olson†	Rep	Adam Thomas	Rep
24th	J. R. Claeys	Rep	J. R. Claeys	Rep
25th	Mary Ware	Dem	Mary Ware	Dem
26th	Dan Kerschen†	Rep	Chase Blasi	Rep
27th	Chase Blasi (Note: Appointed in 2023 to replace incumbent Gene Suellentrop.)	Rep	Joe Claeys	Rep
28th	Mike Petersen	Rep	Mike Petersen	Rep
29th	Oletha Faust-Goudeau	Dem	Oletha Faust-Goudeau	Dem
30th	Renee Erickson	Rep	Renee Erickson	Rep
31st	Carolyn McGinn†	Rep	Stephen Owens	Rep
32nd	Larry Alley	Rep	Larry Alley	Rep
33rd	Alicia Straub†	Rep	Tory Marie Blew	Rep
34th	Mark Steffen†	Rep	Michael Murphy	Rep
35th	Rick Wilborn†	Rep	TJ Rose	Rep
36th	Elaine Bowers	Rep	Elaine Bowers	Rep
37th	Molly Baumgardner†	Rep	Doug Shane	Rep
38th	Ron Ryckman Sr. (Note: Appointed in 2021 to replace incumbent Bud Estes)	Rep	Ron Ryckman Sr.	Rep
39th	John Doll†	Rep	William Clifford	Rep
40th	Rick Billinger	Rep	Rick Billinger	Rep

== Results by district ==
Official primary and general election results from the Kansas Secretary of State:

=== District 1 ===
2024 Kansas Senate District 1 Republican primary
Party	Candidate	Votes	%
Republican	Craig Bowser	5,069	40.64
Republican	John Eplee	4,543	36.43
Republican	Dennis Pyle (incumbent)	2,860	22.93
Total votes		12,472	100.00

2024 Kansas Senate District 1 general election
Party	Candidate	Votes	%
Republican	Craig Bowser	29,530	100.00
Total votes		29,530	100.00
Republican hold			

=== District 2 ===
2024 Kansas Senate District 2 Democratic primary
Party	Candidate	Votes	%
Democratic	Marci Francisco (incumbent)	3,947	56.62
Democratic	Christina Haswood	3,024	43.38
Total votes		6,971	100.00

2024 Kansas Senate District 2 Republican primary
Party	Candidate	Votes	%
Republican	David Miller	1,031	100.00
Total votes		1,031	100.00

2024 Kansas Senate District 2 general election
Party	Candidate	Votes	%
Democratic	Marci Francisco (incumbent	24,004	78.30
Republican	David Miller	6,651	21.70
Total votes		30,655	100.00
Democratic hold			

=== District 3 ===
2024 Kansas Senate District 3 Republican primary
Party	Candidate	Votes	%
Republican	Rick Kloos (incumbent)	5,200	100.00
Total votes		5,200	100.00

2024 Kansas Senate District 3 Democratic primary
Party	Candidate	Votes	%
Democratic	Dena Sattler	2,813	100
Total votes		2,813	100.00

2024 Kansas Senate District 3 general election
Party	Candidate	Votes	%
Republican	Rick Kloos (incumbent)	21,942	57.40
Democratic	Dena Sattler	16,285	42.60
Total votes		38,227	100.00
Republican gain from Democratic			

=== District 4 ===
2024 Kansas Senate District 4 Democratic primary
Party	Candidate	Votes	%
Democratic	David Haley (incumbent)	2,593	57.57
Democratic	Ephren Taylor III	1,911	42.43
Total votes		4,504	100.00

2024 Kansas Senate District 4 general election
Party	Candidate	Votes	%
Democratic	David Haley (incumbent)	13,941	100.00
Total votes		13,941	100.00
Democratic hold			

=== District 5 ===
2024 Kansas Senate District 5 Democratic primary
Party	Candidate	Votes	%
Democratic	Jeff Pittman (incumbent)	2,805	100.00
Total votes		2,805	100.00

2024 Kansas Senate District 5 Republican primary
Party	Candidate	Votes	%
Republican	Jeff Klemp	3,174	59.30
Republican	Echo Van Meteren	2,178	40.70
Total votes		5,352	100.00

2024 Kansas Senate District 5 general election
Party	Candidate	Votes	%
Republican	Jeff Klemp	15,732	50.05
Democratic	Jeff Pittman (incumbent)	15,701	49.95
Total votes		31,433	100.00
Republican gain from Democratic			

=== District 6 ===
2024 Kansas Senate District 6 Democratic primary
Party	Candidate	Votes	%
Democratic	Pat Pettey (incumbent)	2,471	100.00
Total votes		2,471	100.00

2024 Kansas Senate District 6 Republican primary
Party	Candidate	Votes	%
Republican	Tabitha Burt	1,114	100.00
Total votes		1,114	100.0

2024 Kansas Senate District 6 general election
Party	Candidate	Votes	%
Democratic	Pat Pettey (incumbent)	12,882	62.79
Republican	Tabitha Burt	7,634	37.21
Total votes		20,526	100.00
Democratic hold			

=== District 7 ===
2024 Kansas Senate District 7 Democratic primary
Party	Candidate	Votes	%
Democratic	Ethan Corson (incumbent)	6,175	100.00
Total votes		6,175	100.00

2024 Kansas Senate District 7 Republican primary
Party	Candidate	Votes	%
Republican	Dave Dannov	3,708	100.00
Total votes		3,708	100.0

2024 Kansas Senate District 7 general election
Party	Candidate	Votes	%
Democratic	Ethan Corson (incumbent)	29,014	64.33
Republican	Dave Dannov	16,085	35.67
Total votes		45,099	100.00
Democratic hold			

=== District 8 ===
2024 Kansas Senate District 8 Democratic primary
Party	Candidate	Votes	%
Democratic	Cindy Holscher (incumbent)	5,050	100.00
Total votes		5,050	100.0

2024 Kansas Senate District 8 Republican primary
Party	Candidate	Votes	%
Republican	Beneé Hudson	4,195	100.00
Total votes		4,195	100.00

2024 Kansas Senate District 8 general election
Party	Candidate	Votes	%
Democratic	Cindy Holscher (incumbent)	24,795	61.14
Republican	Beneé Hudson	15,758	38.86
Total votes		40,553	100.00
Democratic hold			

=== District 9 ===
2024 Kansas Senate District 9 Republican primary
Party	Candidate	Votes	%
Republican	Beverly Gossage (incumbent)	5,159	74.60
Republican	Bryan Zesiger	1,757	25.40
Total votes		6,916	100.00

2024 Kansas Senate District 9 Democratic primary
Party	Candidate	Votes	%
Democratic	Norman Mallicoat	3,047	100.00
Total votes		3,047	100.0

2024 Kansas Senate District 9 general election
Party	Candidate	Votes	%
Republican	Beverly Gossage (incumbent)	24,242	61.17
Democratic	Norman Mallicoat	15,389	38.83
Total votes		39,631	100.00
Republican hold			

=== District 10 ===
2024 Kansas Senate District 10 Republican primary
Party	Candidate	Votes	%
Republican	Mike Thompson (incumbent)	5,426	100.00
Total votes		5,426	100.0

2024 Kansas Senate District 10 Democratic primary
Party	Candidate	Votes	%
Democratic	Andrew Mall	4,215	100.00
Total votes		4,215	100.00

2024 Kansas Senate District 10 general election
Party	Candidate	Votes	%
Republican	Mike Thompson (incumbent)	23,884	52.39
Democratic	Andrew Mall	21,703	47.61
Total votes		45,587	100.00
Republican hold			

=== District 11 ===
2024 Kansas Senate District 11 Republican primary
Party	Candidate	Votes	%
Republican	Kellie Warren (incumbent)	5,334	100.00
Total votes		5,334	100.00

2024 Kansas Senate District 11 Democratic primary
Party	Candidate	Votes	%
Democratic	Karen Thurlow	3,598	100.00
Total votes		3,598	100.00

2024 Kansas Senate District 11 general election
Party	Candidate	Votes	%
Republican	Kellie Warren (incumbent)	22,905	52.17
Democratic	Karen Thurlow	21,000	47.83
Total votes		43,905	100.00
Republican hold			

=== District 12 ===
2024 Kansas Senate District 12 Republican primary
Party	Candidate	Votes	%
Republican	Caryn Tyson (incumbent)	7,037	69.24%
Republican	Stetson Kern	3,126	30.76%
Total votes		10,163	100.0

2024 Kansas Senate District 12 general election
Party	Candidate	Votes	%
Republican	Caryn Tyson (incumbent)	27,480	81.40
Libertarian	Cullene Lang	6,278	18.60
Total votes		33,758	100.00
Republican hold			

=== District 13 ===
2024 Kansas Senate District 13 Republican primary
Party	Candidate	Votes	%
Republican	Tim Shallenburger (incumbent)	5,660	79.12
Republican	Sam Owen	1,494	20.88
Total votes		7,154	100.00

2024 Kansas Senate District 13 Democratic primary
Party	Candidate	Votes	%
Democratic	Austin Stapleton	2,200	100.00
Total votes		2,200	100.00

2024 Kansas Senate District 13 general election
Party	Candidate	Votes	%
Republican	Tim Shallenburger (incumbent)	21,366	68.62
Democratic	Austin Stapleton	9,771	31.38
Total votes		31,137	100.00
Republican hold			

=== District 14 ===
2024 Kansas Senate District 14 Republican primary
Party	Candidate	Votes	%
Republican	Michael Fagg (incumbent)	5,643	100.00
Total votes		5,643	100.00

2024 Kansas Senate District 14 general election
Party	Candidate	Votes	%
Republican	Michael Fagg (incumbent)	29,264	100.00
Total votes		29,264	100.00
Republican hold			

=== District 15 ===
2024 Kansas Senate District 15 Republican primary
Party	Candidate	Votes	%
Republican	Virgil Peck (incumbent)	7,495	100.00
Total votes		7,495	100.00

2024 Kansas Senate District 15 Democratic primary
Party	Candidate	Votes	%
Democratic	Jerry Reeves	1,200	100.00
Total votes		1,200	100.00

2024 Kansas Senate District 9 general election
Party	Candidate	Votes	%
Republican	Virgil Peck (incumbent)	21,354	72.58
Democratic	Jerry Reeves	8,069	27.42
Total votes		29,423	100.00
Republican hold			

=== District 16 ===
2024 Kansas Senate District 16 Republican primary
Party	Candidate	Votes	%
Republican	Ty Masterson (incumbent)	3,972	100.00
Total votes		3,972	100.00

2024 Kansas Senate District 16 Democratic primary
Party	Candidate	Votes	%
Democratic	Sasha Islam	959	100.00
Total votes		959	100.00

2024 Kansas Senate District 16 general election
Party	Candidate	Votes	%
Republican	Ty Masterson (incumbent)	25,347	65.59
Democratic	Sasha Islam	13,300	34.41
Total votes		38,647	100.00
Republican hold			

=== District 17 ===
2024 Kansas Senate District 17 Republican primary
Party	Candidate	Votes	%
Republican	Mike Argabright	3,230	57.68
Republican	David Schneider	2,370	42.32
Total votes		5,600	100.00

2024 Kansas Senate District 17 Democratic primary
Party	Candidate	Votes	%
Democratic	Lillian Lingenfelter	1,370	100.00
Total votes		1,370	100.00

2024 Kansas Senate District 17 general election
Party	Candidate	Votes	%
Republican	Mike Argabright (incumbent)	14,689	59.86
Democratic	Lillian Lingenfelter	9,851	40.14
Total votes		24,540	100.00
Republican hold			

=== District 18 ===
2024 Kansas Senate District 18 Republican primary
Party	Candidate	Votes	%
Republican	Kenny Titus	7,226	100.00
Total votes		7,226	100.0

2024 Kansas Senate District 18 Democratic primary
Party	Candidate	Votes	%
Democratic	Matthew Robin	1,696	100.00
Total votes		1,696	100.0

2024 Kansas Senate District 18 general election
Party	Candidate	Votes	%
Republican	Kenny Titus (incumbent)	25,445	59.86
Democratic	Matthew Robin	12,657	33.22
Total votes		38,102	100.00
Republican hold			

=== District 19 ===
2024 Kansas Senate District 19 Republican primary
Party	Candidate	Votes	%
Republican	Tyler Wible	1,499	61.43
Republican	Cynthia Smith	941	38.57
Total votes		2,440	100.00

2024 Kansas Senate District 19 Democratic primary
Party	Candidate	Votes	%
Democratic	Patrick Schmidt	2,591	53.01
Democratic	Vic Miller	1,681	34.39
Democratic	ShaMecha King Simms	616	12.60
Total votes		4,888	100.00

2024 Kansas Senate District 19 general election
Party	Candidate	Votes	%
Democratic	Patrick Schmidt	16,784	64.55
Republican	Tyler Wible	9,216	35.45
Total votes		26,000	100.00
Democratic win (new boundaries)			

=== District 20 ===
2024 Kansas Senate District 20 Republican primary
Party	Candidate	Votes	%
Republican	Brenda Dietrich (incumbent)	4,253	52.62
Republican	Josh Powell	3,830	47.38
Total votes		8,083	100.00

2024 Kansas Senate District 20 Democratic primary
Party	Candidate	Votes	%
Democratic	Candace Ayers	2,818	100.00
Total votes		2,818	100.00

2024 Kansas Senate District 20 general election
Party	Candidate	Votes	%
Republican	Brenda Dietrich (incumbent)	23,270	61.84
Democratic	Candace Ayars	14,357	38.16
Total votes		37,627	100.00
Republican hold			

=== District 21 ===
2024 Kansas Senate District 21 Democratic primary
Party	Candidate	Votes	%
Democratic	Dinah Sykes (incumbent)	4,483	100.00
Total votes		4,483	100.00

2024 Kansas Senate District 21 general election
Party	Candidate	Votes	%
Democratic	Dinah Sykes (incumbent)	25,979	100.00
Total votes		25,979	100.00
Democratic hold			

=== District 22 ===
2024 Kansas Senate District 22 Democratic primary
Party	Candidate	Votes	%
Democratic	Usha Reddi (incumbent)	1,002	100.00
Total votes		1,002	100.00

2024 Kansas Senate District 22 Republican primary
Party	Candidate	Votes	%
Republican	Brad Starnes	2,251	100.00
Total votes		2,251	100.00

2024 Kansas Senate District 22 general election
Party	Candidate	Votes	%
Republican	Brad Starnes	12,262	50.91
Democratic	Usha Reddi (incumbent)	11,825	49.09
Total votes		23,687	100.00
Republican gain from Democratic			

=== District 23 ===
2024 Kansas Senate District 23 Republican primary
Party	Candidate	Votes	%
Republican	Adam Thomas	3,884	100.00
Total votes		3,884	100.00

2024 Kansas Senate District 23 Democratic primary
Party	Candidate	Votes	%
Democratic	Stacey Knoell	2,847	100.00
Total votes		2,847	100.00

2024 Kansas Senate District 23 general election
Party	Candidate	Votes	%
Republican	Adam Thomas (incumbent)	18,362	52.39
Democratic	Stacey Knoell	16,686	47.61
Total votes		35,048	100.00
Republican hold			

=== District 24 ===
2024 Kansas Senate District 24 Republican primary
Party	Candidate	Votes	%
Republican	J.R. Claeys (incumbent)	5,573	100.00
Total votes		5,573	100.00

2024 Kansas Senate District 24 Democratic primary
Party	Candidate	Votes	%
Democratic	Josh Baker	978	100.00
Total votes		978	100.00

2024 Kansas Senate District 24 general election
Party	Candidate	Votes	%
Republican	J.R. Claeys (incumbent)	21,548	67.85
Democratic	John Baker	10,210	32.15
Total votes		31,758	100.00
Republican hold			

=== District 25 ===
2024 Kansas Senate District 25 Democratic primary
Party	Candidate	Votes	%
Democratic	Mary Ware (incumbent)	1,321	100.00
Total votes		1,321	100.00

2024 Kansas Senate District 25 Republican primary
Party	Candidate	Votes	%
Republican	Keenan Smith	1,230	100.00
Total votes		1,230	100.00

2024 Kansas Senate District 25 general election
Party	Candidate	Votes	%
Democratic	Mary Ware (incumbent)	11,638	57.09
Republican	Keenen Smith	8,746	42.91
Total votes		20,384	100.00
Democratic hold			

=== District 26 ===
2024 Kansas Senate District 26 Republican primary
Party	Candidate	Votes	%
Republican	Chase Blasi (incumbent)	4,640	85.89
Republican	J.C. Moore	762	14.11
Total votes		5,402	100.0

2024 Kansas Senate District 26 Democratic primary
Party	Candidate	Votes	%
Democratic	Raymond Shore Jr.	785	100.00
Total votes		785	100.00

2024 Kansas Senate District 26 general election
Party	Candidate	Votes	%
Republican	Chase Blasi (incumbent)	24,824	71.24
Democratic	Raymond Shore JR.	8,014	23.00
United Kansas	J.C. Moore	2,006	5.76
Total votes		34,884	100.00
Republican hold			

=== District 27 ===
2024 Kansas Senate District 27 Republican primary
Party	Candidate	Votes	%
Republican	Joe Claeys	4,280	100.00
Total votes		4,280	100.00

2024 Kansas Senate District 27 Democratic primary
Party	Candidate	Votes	%
Democratic	Jennifer Herington	1,377	100.00
Total votes		1,377	100.00

2024 Kansas Senate District 27 general election
Party	Candidate	Votes	%
Republican	Joe Claeys	20,833	60.27
Democratic	Jennifer Herington	13,733	39.73
Total votes		34,566	100.00
Republican hold			

=== District 28 ===
2024 Kansas Senate District 28 Republican primary
Party	Candidate	Votes	%
Republican	Mike Petersen (incumbent)	1,450	100.00
Total votes		1,450	100.0

2024 Kansas Senate District 28 general election
Party	Candidate	Votes	%
Republican	Mike Petersen (incumbent)	15,406	100.00
Total votes		15,406	100.00
Republican hold			

=== District 29 ===
2024 Kansas Senate District 29 Democratic primary
Party	Candidate	Votes	%
Democratic	Oletha Faust-Goudeau (incumbent)	1,526	100.00
Total votes		1,525	100.0

2024 Kansas Senate District 29 general election
Party	Candidate	Votes	%
Democratic	Oletha Faust-Goudeau (incumbent)	14,158	100.00
Total votes		14,518	100.00
Democratic hold			

=== District 30 ===
2024 Kansas Senate District 30 Republican primary
Party	Candidate	Votes	%
Republican	Renee Erickson (incumbent)	2,285	100.00
Total votes		2,285	100.00

2024 Kansas Senate District 30 Democratic primary
Party	Candidate	Votes	%
Democratic	Richard Smith	1,118	100.00
Total votes		1,118	100.00

2024 Kansas Senate District 30 general election
Party	Candidate	Votes	%
Republican	Renee Erickson (incumbent)	18,085	57.14
Democratic	Richard Smith	11,180	35.32
Libertarian	Olivia Hayse	2,385	7.54
Total votes		31,650	100.00
Republican hold			

=== District 31 ===
2024 Kansas Senate District 31 Republican primary
Party	Candidate	Votes	%
Republican	Stephen Owens	4,579	100.00
Total votes		4,579	100.0

2024 Kansas Senate District 31 Democratic primary
Party	Candidate	Votes	%
Democratic	Jason Miller	1,258	100.00
Total votes		1,258	100.0

2024 Kansas Senate District 31 general election
Party	Candidate	Votes	%
Republican	Stephen Owens	22,422	64.26
Democratic	Jason Miller	12,472	35.74
Total votes		34,894	100.00
Republican hold			

=== District 32 ===
2024 Kansas Senate District 32 Republican primary
Party	Candidate	Votes	%
Republican	Larry Alley (incumbent)	5,342	100.00
Total votes		5,342	100.0

2024 Kansas Senate District 32 Democratic primary
Party	Candidate	Votes	%
Democratic	Lawrence Moreno	760	67.50
Democratic	Michael Soetaert	366	32.50
Total votes		1,126	100.0

2024 Kansas Senate District 32 general election
Party	Candidate	Votes	%
Republican	Larry Alley (incumbent)	23,603	73.38
Democratic	Lawrence Moreno	8,562	26.62
Total votes		32,165	100.00
Republican hold			

=== District 33 ===
2024 Kansas Senate District 33 Republican primary
Party	Candidate	Votes	%
Republican	Tory Marie Blew	6,638	65.42
Republican	John Sturn	3,509	34.58
Total votes		10,147	100.0

2024 Kansas Senate District 33 Democratic primary
Party	Candidate	Votes	%
Democratic	Matthew Westenfeld	809	100.00
Total votes		809	100.00

2024 Kansas Senate District 33 general election
Party	Candidate	Votes	%
Republican	Tory Marie Blew	24,998	80.43
Democratic	Matthew Westenfeld	6,082	19.57
Total votes		31,080	100.00
Republican hold			

=== District 34 ===
2024 Kansas Senate District 34 Republican primary
Party	Candidate	Votes	%
Republican	Michael Murphy	4,500	53.29
Republican	Bob Fee	3,945	46.71
Total votes		8,445	100.00

2024 Kansas Senate District 34 Democratic primary
Party	Candidate	Votes	%
Democratic	Shanna Henry	960	100.00
Total votes		960	100.00

2024 Kansas Senate District 34 general election
Party	Candidate	Votes	%
Republican	Michael Murphy	22,757	70.82
Democratic	Shanna Henry	9,375	29.18
Total votes		32,492	100.00
Republican hold			

=== District 35 ===
2024 Kansas Senate District 35 Republican primary
Party	Candidate	Votes	%
Republican	TJ Rose	5,073	100.00
Total votes		5,073	100.0

2024 Kansas Senate District 35 Democratic primary
Party	Candidate	Votes	%
Democratic	Jason Anderson	3,161	100.00
Total votes		3,161	100.00

2024 Kansas Senate District 35 general election
Party	Candidate	Votes	%
Republican	TJ Rose	23,088	52.77
Democratic	Jason Anderson	20,664	47.23
Total votes		43,752	100.00
Republican hold			

=== District 36 ===
2024 Kansas Senate District 36 Republican primary
Party	Candidate	Votes	%
Republican	Elaine Bowers (incumbent)	9,654	83.08
Republican	Robert Bonanata	1,966	16.92
Total votes		11,620	100.0

2024 Kansas Senate District 36 general election
Party	Candidate	Votes	%
Republican	Elaine Bowers (incumbent)	33,162	100.00
Total votes		33,162	100.00
Republican hold			

=== District 37 ===
2024 Kansas Senate District 37 Republican primary
Party	Candidate	Votes	%
Republican	Douglas Shane	4,542	100.00
Total votes		4,542	100.0

2024 Kansas Senate District 37 Democratic primary
Party	Candidate	Votes	%
Democratic	Sherry Giebler	2,516	100.00
Total votes		2,516	100.00

2024 Kansas Senate District 37 general election
Party	Candidate	Votes	%
Republican	Douglas Shane	21,460	59.34
Democratic	Sherry Giebler	14,705	40.66
Total votes		36,165	100.00
Republican hold			

=== District 38 ===
2024 Kansas Senate District 38 Republican primary
Party	Candidate	Votes	%
Republican	Ron Ryckman Sr. (incumbent)	3,940	100.00
Total votes		3,940	100.0

2024 Kansas Senate District 38 Democratic primary
Party	Candidate	Votes	%
Democratic	Jose Lara	395	100.00
Total votes		395	100.00

2024 Kansas Senate District 38 general election
Party	Candidate	Votes	%
Republican	Ron Ryckman Sr. (incumbent)	14,112	73.75
Democratic	Jose Lara	5,023	26.25
Total votes		19,135	100.00
Republican hold			

=== District 39 ===
2024 Kansas Senate District 39 Republican primary
Party	Candidate	Votes	%
Republican	William Clifford	6,399	100.00
Total votes		6,399	100.0

2024 Kansas Senate District 39 Democratic primary
Party	Candidate	Votes	%
Democratic	Isidro Marino	525	100.00
Total votes		525	100.0

2024 Kansas Senate District 39 general election
Party	Candidate	Votes	%
Republican	William Clifford	18,095	80.22
Democratic	Isidro Marino	4,463	19.78
Total votes		22,558	100.00
Republican hold			

=== District 40 ===
2024 Kansas Senate District 40 Republican primary
Party	Candidate	Votes	%
Republican	Rick Billinger (incumbent)	8,542	100.00
Total votes		8,542	100.0

2024 Kansas Senate District 40 general election
Party	Candidate	Votes	%
Republican	Rick Billinger (incumbent)	30,795	100.00
Total votes		30,975	100.00
Republican hold			

== See also ==
- 2024 Kansas elections
- Elections in Kansas
