= 2022 Kansas gubernatorial election =

- November 8, 2022
- Turnout: 47.94% ▼
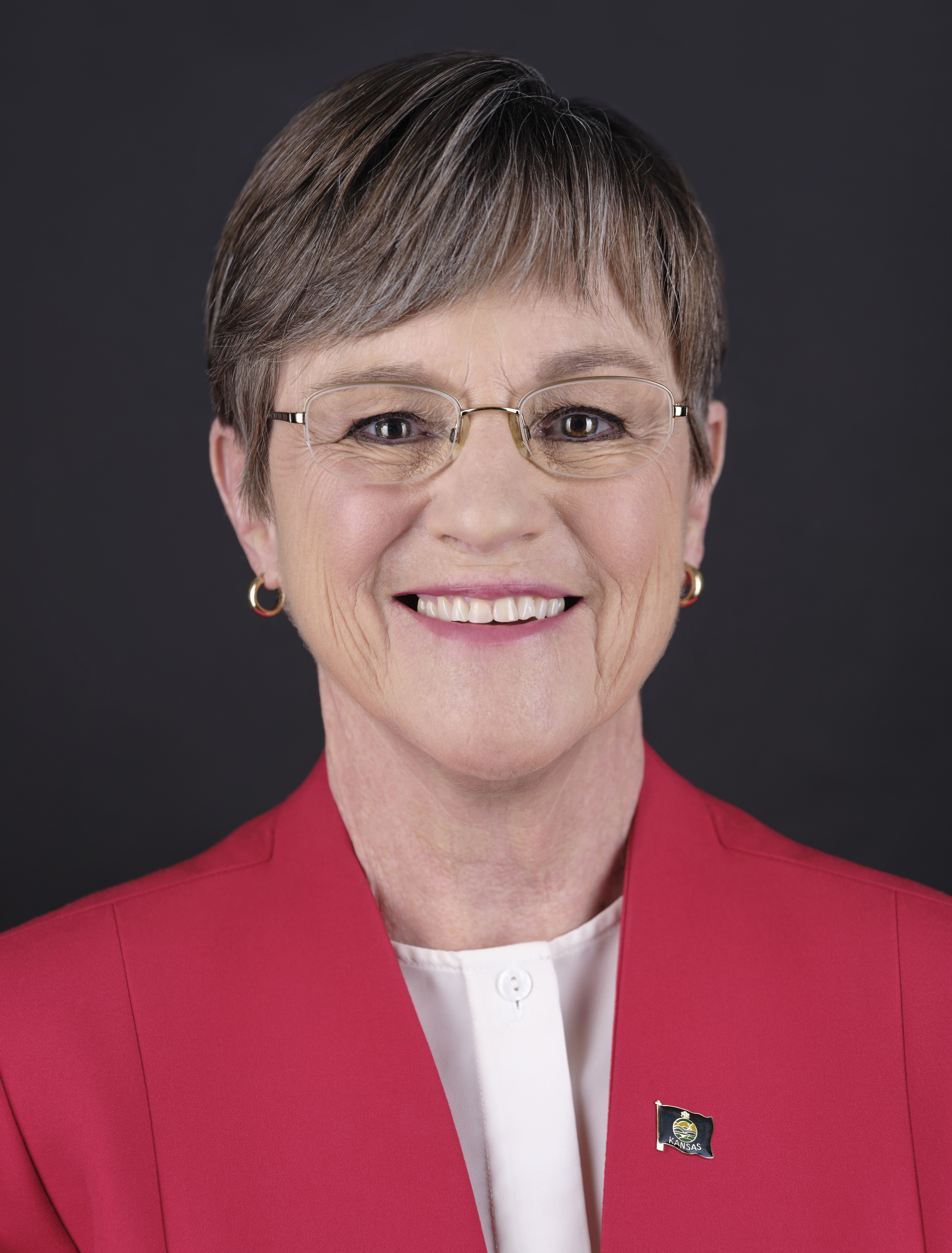

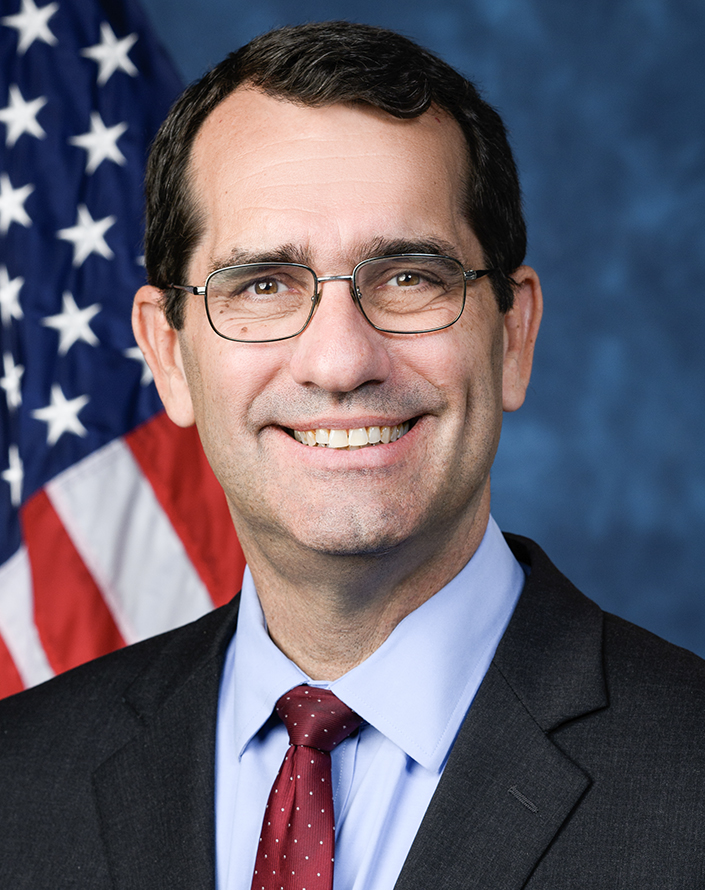
Nominee	Laura Kelly	Derek Schmidt
Party	Democratic	Republican
Running mate	David Toland	Katie Sawyer
Popular vote	499,849	477,591
Percentage	49.54%	47.33%
- Kelly: 40–50% 50–60% 60–70% 70–80% 80–90% >90% Schmidt: 40–50% 50–60% 60–70% 70–80% 80–90% >90% Pyle: 60–70% >90% Tie: 30–40% 40–50% 50% No votes
Governor before election
Laura Kelly
Democratic
Elected Governor
Laura Kelly
Democratic

The 2022 Kansas gubernatorial election took place on November 8, 2022, to elect the governor of Kansas, with primary elections taking place on August 2, 2022. Governor Laura Kelly won election to a second term, defeating Republican State Attorney General Derek Schmidt in the general election by a margin of roughly 2.2 percentage points. This was the only statewide victory in 2022 for Democrats in Kansas.

This was the only Democratic-held governorship up for election in 2022 in a state Donald Trump won in the 2020 presidential election, and the race was expected to be one of the most competitive gubernatorial races in the nation. Some analysts and Kansas Republican Party officials had also predicted that Dennis Pyle, who was on the ballot as an independent, would have a spoiler effect benefiting Kelly. This was the first gubernatorial election in Kansas since 1986 in which the winner was from the same party as the incumbent president, and the first since 1978 that it was a Democrat.

== Democratic primary ==
=== Candidates ===
==== Nominated ====
- Laura Kelly, incumbent governor (2019–present)
  - Running mate: David Toland, incumbent lieutenant governor (2021–present) and secretary of commerce (2019–present)

==== Eliminated in primary ====
- Richard Karnowski, accountant
  - Running mate: Barry Franco

=== Endorsements ===
Laura Kelly

State officials

- Sandy Praeger, former Kansas insurance commissioner (Republican)
- Gary Sherrer, former lieutenant governor of Kansas (Republican)

State legislators

- Audrey Langworthy, former state senator (Republican)
- Steve Morris, former president of the Kansas Senate (Republican)
- Lana Oleen, former state senator (Republican)
- Charles Roth, state representative (Republican)
- Sheryl Spalding, former state representative (Republican)

Organizations

- EMILY's List
- Feminist Majority PAC

=== Results ===
Results by county: Kelly: 70–80%; 80–90%; 90–100%

Democratic primary results
Party	Candidate	Votes	%
Democratic	Laura Kelly (incumbent); David Toland (incumbent)	270,968	93.84
Democratic	Richard Karnowski; Barry Franco	17,802	6.16
Total votes		288,770	100

== Republican primary ==
=== Candidates ===
==== Nominated ====
- Derek Schmidt, Kansas attorney general (2011–2023)
  - Running mate: Katie Sawyer, political staffer

==== Eliminated in primary ====
- Arlyn Briggs, perennial candidate
  - Running mate: Lance Berland, candidate for the U.S. Senate in 2020

==== Withdrew ====
- Jeff Colyer, former governor (2018–2019) and former lieutenant governor (2011–2018) (endorsed Schmidt)
- Chase LaPorte, businessman

==== Declined ====
- Wink Hartman, businessman and nominee for lieutenant governor in 2018
- Kris Kobach, former Kansas secretary of state (2011–2019), nominee for governor in 2018, and candidate for the U.S. Senate in 2020 (running for Kansas attorney general)
- Jerry Moran, U.S. senator (2011–present) (running for re-election)
- Ron Ryckman Jr., speaker of the Kansas House of Representatives (2017–2023) from the 78th District (2013–2023) (endorsed Schmidt)

=== Endorsements ===
Derek Schmidt

U.S. executive branch officials

- Mike Pompeo, former United States secretary of state (2018–2021), former director of the Central Intelligence Agency (2017–2018), and former U.S. representative for Kansas's 4th congressional district (2011–2017)
- Donald Trump, 45th president of the United States (2017–2021)

U.S. senators

- Bob Dole, former U.S. senator from Kansas (1969–1996), former Senate majority leader (1985–1987, 1995–1996) and Republican nominee for president in 1996 and vice president in 1976 (deceased)
- Roger Marshall, U.S. senator from Kansas (2021–present) (previously endorsed Colyer)
- Pat Roberts, former U.S. senator from Kansas (1997–2021)

U.S. representatives

- Ron Estes, U.S. representative for Kansas's 4th congressional district (2017–present)
- Jake LaTurner, U.S. representative for Kansas's 2nd congressional district (2021–present)
- Tracey Mann, U.S. representative for Kansas's 1st congressional district (2021–present) and former lieutenant governor of Kansas (2018–2019)

State officials

- Jeff Colyer, former governor of Kansas (2018–2019) and former lieutenant governor (2011–2018)
- Mike Parson, governor of Missouri (2018–present)
- Ron Ryckman Jr., speaker of the Kansas House of Representatives (2017–present) from the 78th district (2013–present)

Organizations

- American Conservative Union
- Americans for Prosperity-Kansas
- Kansas Farm Bureau PAC
- Kansas Republican Party
- NRA Political Victory Fund
Jeff Colyer (withdrew)

U.S. representatives

- ~~Tracey Mann, U.S. representative for Kansas's 1st congressional district (2021–present) and former lieutenant governor of Kansas (2018–2019)~~ (endorsed Schmidt after Colyer's withdrawal)
Declined to endorse

U.S. senators

- Jerry Moran, U.S. senator from Kansas (2011–present)

=== Polling ===
Hypothetical polling

Poll source	Date(s) administered	Sample size (Note: Key: A – all adults RV – registered voters LV – likely voters V – unclear)	Margin of error	Jeff Colyer	Ron Ryckman Jr.	Derek Schmidt	Undecided
Cygnal (R) (Note: This poll was sponsored by Our Way of Life PAC.)	March 3–4, 2021	510 (LV)	± 4.3%	19%	5%	28%	49%

=== Results ===
Results by county: Schmidt: 70–80%; 80–90%; 90–100%

Republican primary results
Party	Candidate	Votes	%
Republican	Derek Schmidt; Katie Sawyer	373,524	80.60
Republican	Arlyn Briggs; Lance Berland	89,898	19.40
Total votes		463,422	100.00

== Independent ==
=== Candidates ===
==== Declared ====
- Dennis Pyle, state senator from the 1st district, former Republican (2005–2025)
  - Kathleen Garrison, Clearwater school board member

== General election ==
=== Campaign ===
Reporters noted the lack of attention towards abortion as an issue in the campaign by both major candidates, despite the defeat of an abortion amendment in August which was widely seen as a prominent victory for the pro-choice movement. In televised debates, Schmidt said that he respected the referendum results and accused Kelly of opposing existing abortion restrictions. Kelly denied the accusation, saying that she had stayed consistent on the subject, and further adding that she believed in "bodily autonomy" for women. When pressed on whether they would support retaining all justices in the state Supreme Court who ruled abortion as a fundamental constitutional right in 2019 and were up on the ballot, Kelly said that she would, while Schmidt said he would vote to retain some and not others.

Instead, both candidates focused more on "kitchen-table" issues such as the economy and education, where polls showed that the former of which was the most important concern among voters. Kelly's campaign tied Schmidt with former governor Sam Brownback and his Kansas experiment, highlighting Schmidt's defense of lawsuits regarding budget cuts to public education as the attorney general. In the contrary, Schmidt's campaign tied Kelly with President Joe Biden by focusing on national issues such as the increase in inflation and gas prices, portraying them as "big-spending liberals". Other issues include criminal justice and transgender people in sports.

Aside from state Supreme Court justice retention elections and other statewide elections, the election was also held on the same ballot as two referendums for proposed constitutional amendments. Question 1 would authorize the state legislature to veto any rules and regulations implemented by Kansas's executive branch with a simple majority. The proposal was spearheaded by Schmidt in 2021 in response to Governor Kelly's pandemic-related measures to close schools temporarily and he made COVID-19 lockdowns and mandates as a focal point in his platform. Kelly's campaign countered that the amendment would be a "power grab" that could create further gridlock in the state's legislative process. Question 2 would require most sheriffs to be elected directly by voters and that they could only be removed by a recall election or a challenge by the state attorney general. In a press release, Schmidt said that he would campaign for the amendment, arguing that electing sheriffs would make them "uniquely accountable to the people". Critics pointed out that the amendment could create abuse of power as the authority to investigate the sheriff would be stripped from district attorneys in every county and the attorney general could "play favorites" into which sheriff to investigate. In the end, Question 1 failed narrowly by a one-point margin, while Question 2 passed with 62% of the vote.

=== Predictions ===
Source	Ranking	As of
The Cook Political Report	Tossup	July 26, 2022
Inside Elections	Tossup	July 22, 2022
Sabato's Crystal Ball	Lean R (flip)	November 7, 2022
Politico	Tossup	August 12, 2022
RCP	Tossup	August 3, 2022
Fox News	Tossup	October 25, 2022
538	Lean D	September 13, 2022
Elections Daily	Lean D	November 7, 2022

=== Post-primary endorsements ===
Laura Kelly (D)

Federal officials

- Sheila Frahm, former United States senator for Kansas (1996) (Republican)
- Nancy Kassebaum, former United States senator for Kansas (1978–1997) (Republican)
- Stephen McAllister, former United States attorney for the District of Kansas (2018–2021), former solicitor general of Kansas (2007–2018) (Republican)

State officials

- John W. Carlin, former governor of Kansas (1979–1987), former archivist of the United States (1995–2005)
- Bill Graves, former governor of Kansas (1995–2003) (Republican)
- Mike Hayden, former governor of Kansas (1987–1991) (Republican)
- Kathleen Sebelius, former governor of Kansas (2003–2009), former U.S. secretary of health and human services (2009–2014)
- Robert Stephan, former attorney general of Kansas (1979–1995) (Republican)
- Carla Stovall, former attorney general of Kansas (1995–2003) (Republican)

State legislators

- Jan Kessinger, former state representative (2017–2021) (Republican)

Organizations

- End Citizens United
- Equality Kansas
- Kansas AFL–CIO
- Let America Vote
- National Education Association
- National Women's Political Caucus
- United Auto Workers

Newspapers

- The Wichita Eagle
Derek Schmidt (R)

U.S. executive branch officials

- Mike Pence, former vice president of the United States (2017–2021), and former governor of Indiana (2013–2017)

Federal legislators

- Jerry Moran, U.S. senator from Kansas (2011–present)

State officials

- Chris Christie, former governor of New Jersey (2010–2018)
- Ron DeSantis, governor of Florida (2019–present)
- Glenn Youngkin, governor of Virginia (2022–2026)

=== Polling ===
Aggregate polls

Source of poll aggregation	Dates administered	Dates updated	Laura Kelly (D)	Derek Schmidt (R)	Other (Note: Calculated by taking the difference of 100% and all other candidates combined.)	Margin
FiveThirtyEight	August 10 – October 29, 2022	November 2, 2022	48.6%	43.5%	7.9%	Kelly +5.1

Poll source	Date(s) administered	Sample size	Margin of error	Laura Kelly (D)	Derek Schmidt (R)	Dennis Pyle (I)	Other	Undecided
Emerson College	October 27–29, 2022	1,000 (LV)	± 3.0%	46%	43%	5%	2% (Note: Cordell (L) with 1%; "Someone else" with 1%)	4%
Emerson College	October 27–29, 2022	1,000 (LV)	± 3.0%	49%	44%	5%	2% (Note: Cordell (L) with 1%; "Someone else" with 1%)	–
Jayhawk Consulting (D) (Note: This poll was sponsored by Patrick Schmidt's campaign, the Democratic nominee for Kansas's 2nd congressional district.)	October 10–12, 2022	500 (LV)	–	38%	37%	7%	–	18%
Emerson College	September 15–18, 2022	1,000 (LV)	± 3.0%	45%	43%	3%	1% (Note: "Someone else" with 1%)	8%
Echelon Insights (Note: This poll was sponsored by NetChoice.)	August 31 – September 7, 2022	392 (LV)	± 7.5%	53%	41%	–	–	5%
Battleground Connect (R) (Note: This poll was sponsored by the John Brown Freedom Fund.)	August 8–10, 2022	1,074 (LV)	± 3.0%	45%	48%	2%	–	5%
WPA Intelligence (R) (Note: This poll was sponsored by Kris Kobach's campaign for Attorney General.)	April 26–27, 2022	500 (LV)	± 4.4%	43%	47%	–	–	10%
Clarity Campaign Labs (D) (Note: This poll was sponsored by EMILY's List, which supports Kelly.)	September 13–15, 2021	810 (LV)	± 3.5%	47%	44%	–	–	9%
Remington Research Group (R)	September 7–9, 2021	1,000 (LV)	± 3.0%	40%	44%	–	–	16%

=== Debates and forums ===
2022 Kansas gubernatorial debates and forums
No.	Date	Host	Moderator	Location	Link	Republican	Democratic	Libertarian	Independent
P Participant A Absent N Non-invitee I Invitee W Withdrawn									
P Participant A Absent N Non-invitee I Invitee W Withdrawn						Derek Schmidt	Laura Kelly	Seth Cordell	Dennis Pyle
1	September 7, 2022	Kansas Chamber of Commerce	–	Olathe	(Note: Recording not made public)	P	P	N	N
2	September 10, 2022	WIBW-FM	Greg Akagi	Hutchinson	Youtube	P	P	N	N
3	October 5, 2022	Kansas City PBS/ Johnson County Bar Association	Nick Haines	Overland Park	Youtube	P	P	N	N

=== Results ===
2022 Kansas gubernatorial election
Party	Candidate	Votes	%	±%
Democratic	Laura Kelly (incumbent); David Toland (incumbent)	499,849	49.54%	+1.53%
Republican	Derek Schmidt; Katie Sawyer	477,591	47.33%	+4.35%
Independent	Dennis Pyle; Kathleen Garrison	20,452	2.03%	N/A
Libertarian	Seth Cordell; Evan Laudick-Gains	11,106	1.10%	−0.80%
Total votes		1,008,998	100.0%	
Turnout			47.94%	
Democratic hold				

==== By county ====
County	Kelly / Toland Democratic		Schmidt / Sawyer Republican		Pyle / Garrison Independent		Cordell / Laudick-Gains Libertarian		Margin		Total
County	#	%	#	%	#	%	#	%	#	%	Total
Allen	1,579	38.16%	2,424	58.58%	94	2.27%	41	0.99%	−845	−20.42%	4,138
Anderson	835	28.71%	1,899	65.30%	145	4.99%	29	1.00%	−1,064	−36.59%	2,908
Atchison	2,185	39.87%	2,929	53.45%	313	5.71%	53	0.97%	−744	−13.58%	5,480
Barber	403	23.09%	1,261	72.26%	60	3.44%	21	1.20%	−858	−49.17%	1,745
Barton	2,645	32.67%	5,026	62.09%	305	3.77%	119	1.47%	−2,381	−29.41%	8,095
Bourbon	1,474	30.46%	3,155	65.20%	141	2.91%	69	1.43%	−1,681	−34.74%	4,839
Brown	1,180	35.05%	1,837	54.56%	318	9.44%	32	0.95%	−657	−19.51%	3,367
Butler	9,042	38.06%	13,867	58.37%	559	2.35%	288	1.21%	−4,825	−20.31%	23,756
Chase	463	39.07%	692	58.40%	18	1.52%	12	1.01%	−229	−19.32%	1,185
Chautauqua	200	16.92%	960	81.22%	18	1.52%	4	0.34%	−760	−64.30%	1,182
Cherokee	1,833	28.49%	4,378	68.06%	151	2.35%	71	1.10%	−2,545	−39.56%	6,433
Cheyenne	207	20.33%	785	77.11%	15	1.47%	11	1.08%	−578	−56.78%	1,018
Clark	220	25.82%	565	66.31%	44	5.16%	23	2.70%	−345	−40.49%	852
Clay	1,105	33.47%	2,051	62.13%	112	3.39%	33	1.00%	−946	−28.66%	3,301
Cloud	1,014	31.64%	2,103	65.62%	69	2.15%	19	0.59%	−1,089	−33.98%	3,205
Coffey	1,049	30.47%	2,251	65.38%	108	3.14%	35	1.02%	−1,202	−34.91%	3,443
Comanche	188	25.27%	514	69.09%	27	3.63%	15	2.02%	−326	−43.82%	744
Cowley	4,327	40.55%	5,898	55.27%	324	3.04%	122	1.14%	−1,571	−14.72%	10,671
Crawford	5,432	45.90%	6,033	50.98%	245	2.07%	124	1.05%	−601	−5.08%	11,834
Decatur	283	25.00%	803	70.94%	36	3.18%	10	0.88%	−520	−45.94%	1,132
Dickinson	2,414	34.77%	4,253	61.26%	183	2.64%	93	1.34%	−1,839	−26.49%	6,943
Doniphan	648	24.51%	1,773	67.06%	193	7.30%	30	1.13%	−1,125	−42.55%	2,644
Douglas	35,796	75.53%	10,634	22.44%	581	1.23%	385	0.81%	25,162	53.09%	47,396
Edwards	333	30.47%	725	66.33%	25	2.29%	10	0.91%	−392	−35.86%	1,093
Elk	283	26.30%	750	69.70%	24	2.23%	19	1.77%	−467	−43.40%	1,076
Ellis	4,248	40.26%	5,968	56.56%	228	2.16%	108	1.02%	−1,720	−16.30%	10,552
Ellsworth	866	38.70%	1,269	56.70%	63	2.82%	40	1.79%	−403	−18.01%	2,238
Finney	2,924	40.66%	4,021	55.92%	169	2.35%	77	1.07%	−1,097	−15.26%	7,191
Ford	2,348	39.17%	3,410	56.89%	162	2.70%	74	1.23%	−1,062	−17.72%	5,994
Franklin	3,823	40.09%	5,374	56.36%	230	2.41%	108	1.13%	−1,551	−16.27%	9,535
Geary	3,094	50.93%	2,758	45.40%	146	2.40%	77	1.27%	336	5.53%	6,075
Gove	248	21.36%	866	74.59%	39	3.36%	8	0.69%	−618	−53.23%	1,161
Graham	280	27.11%	709	68.64%	27	2.61%	17	1.65%	−429	−41.53%	1,033
Grant	489	30.32%	1,055	65.41%	43	2.67%	26	1.61%	−566	−35.09%	1,613
Gray	428	24.91%	1,222	71.13%	46	2.68%	22	1.28%	−794	−46.22%	1,718
Greeley	114	25.17%	312	68.87%	20	4.42%	7	1.55%	−198	−43.71%	453
Greenwood	753	32.46%	1,483	63.92%	56	2.41%	28	1.21%	−730	−31.47%	2,320
Hamilton	175	28.93%	401	66.28%	22	3.64%	7	1.16%	−226	−37.36%	605
Harper	577	29.16%	1,314	66.40%	63	3.18%	25	1.26%	−737	−37.24%	1,979
Harvey	6,206	48.05%	6,279	48.61%	275	2.13%	157	1.22%	−73	−0.57%	12,917
Haskell	250	25.15%	715	71.93%	15	1.51%	14	1.41%	−465	−46.78%	994
Hodgeman	181	22.43%	594	73.61%	27	3.35%	5	0.62%	−413	−51.18%	807
Jackson	2,081	40.89%	2,670	52.47%	283	5.56%	55	1.08%	−589	−11.57%	5,089
Jefferson	3,380	44.35%	3,939	51.68%	228	2.99%	75	0.98%	−559	−7.33%	7,622
Jewell	268	22.19%	861	71.27%	59	4.88%	20	1.66%	−593	−49.09%	1,208
Johnson	155,104	59.04%	102,162	38.89%	3,050	1.16%	2,381	0.91%	52,942	20.15%	262,697
Kearny	220	22.99%	694	72.52%	25	2.61%	18	1.88%	−474	−49.53%	957
Kingman	971	31.32%	1,997	64.42%	101	3.26%	31	1.00%	−1,026	−33.10%	3,100
Kiowa	234	24.79%	662	70.13%	26	2.75%	22	2.33%	−428	−45.34%	944
Labette	2,287	38.59%	3,470	58.55%	121	2.04%	49	0.83%	−1,183	−19.96%	5,927
Lane	164	24.08%	487	71.51%	21	3.08%	9	1.32%	−323	−47.43%	681
Leavenworth	12,480	46.41%	13,419	49.90%	643	2.39%	351	1.31%	−939	−3.49%	26,893
Lincoln	344	28.57%	803	66.69%	39	3.24%	18	1.50%	−459	−38.12%	1,204
Linn	979	26.30%	2,576	69.19%	120	3.22%	48	1.29%	−1,597	−42.90%	3,723
Logan	237	21.45%	818	74.03%	38	3.44%	12	1.09%	−581	−52.58%	1,105
Lyon	5,380	53.12%	4,411	43.55%	182	1.80%	155	1.53%	969	9.57%	10,128
Marion	1,709	35.49%	2,935	60.96%	114	2.37%	57	1.18%	−1,226	−25.46%	4,815
Marshall	1,523	39.06%	2,157	55.32%	194	4.98%	25	0.64%	−634	−16.26%	3,899
McPherson	4,158	37.65%	6,509	58.94%	228	2.06%	149	1.35%	−2,351	−21.29%	11,044
Meade	309	23.55%	951	72.48%	33	2.52%	19	1.45%	−642	−48.93%	1,312
Miami	5,050	37.42%	7,993	59.23%	298	2.21%	153	1.13%	−2,943	−21.81%	13,494
Mitchell	718	30.23%	1,577	66.40%	61	2.57%	19	0.80%	−859	−36.17%	2,375
Montgomery	2,746	28.57%	6,567	68.33%	198	2.06%	100	1.04%	−3,821	−39.76%	9,611
Morris	942	41.98%	1,227	54.68%	46	2.05%	29	1.29%	−285	−12.70%	2,244
Morton	167	20.67%	606	75.00%	20	2.48%	15	1.86%	−439	−54.33%	808
Nemaha	1,276	27.68%	2,957	64.16%	342	7.42%	34	0.74%	−1,681	−36.47%	4,609
Neosho	1,854	36.31%	3,053	59.79%	158	3.09%	41	0.80%	−1,199	−23.48%	5,106
Ness	208	17.98%	900	77.79%	40	3.46%	9	0.78%	−692	−59.81%	1,157
Norton	473	26.29%	1,244	69.15%	65	3.61%	17	0.94%	−771	−42.86%	1,799
Osage	2,449	38.97%	3,582	56.99%	169	2.69%	85	1.35%	−1,133	−18.03%	6,285
Osborne	394	27.36%	937	65.07%	80	5.56%	29	2.01%	−543	−37.71%	1,440
Ottawa	695	29.10%	1,592	66.67%	71	2.97%	30	1.26%	−897	−37.56%	2,388
Pawnee	827	38.38%	1,207	56.01%	97	4.50%	24	1.11%	−380	−17.63%	2,155
Phillips	465	21.26%	1,647	75.31%	48	2.19%	27	1.23%	−1,182	−54.05%	2,187
Pottawatomie	3,789	36.08%	6,245	59.46%	365	3.48%	104	0.99%	−2,456	−23.38%	10,503
Pratt	1,168	37.34%	1,841	58.86%	71	2.27%	48	1.53%	−673	−21.52%	3,128
Rawlins	308	26.83%	808	70.38%	19	1.66%	13	1.13%	−500	−43.55%	1,148
Reno	8,813	42.42%	11,083	53.35%	425	2.05%	455	2.19%	−2,270	−10.93%	20,776
Republic	494	25.08%	1,396	70.86%	46	2.34%	34	1.73%	−902	−45.79%	1,970
Rice	985	31.65%	1,858	59.70%	70	2.25%	199	6.39%	−873	−28.05%	3,112
Riley	10,849	59.63%	6,849	37.64%	286	1.57%	211	1.16%	4,000	21.98%	18,195
Rooks	541	25.71%	1,488	70.72%	49	2.33%	26	1.24%	−947	−45.01%	2,104
Rush	390	29.37%	852	64.16%	59	4.44%	27	2.03%	−462	−34.79%	1,328
Russell	886	32.61%	1,698	62.50%	73	2.69%	60	2.21%	−812	−29.89%	2,717
Saline	8,036	45.32%	9,124	51.46%	344	1.94%	227	1.28%	−1,088	−6.14%	17,731
Scott	346	20.36%	1,279	75.28%	51	3.00%	23	1.35%	−933	−54.91%	1,699
Sedgwick	77,727	50.08%	72,884	46.96%	2,895	1.87%	1,700	1.10%	4,843	3.12%	155,206
Seward	1,104	37.50%	1,726	58.63%	75	2.55%	39	1.32%	−622	−21.13%	2,944
Shawnee	39,312	59.64%	24,882	37.75%	1,148	1.74%	572	0.87%	14,430	21.89%	65,914
Sheridan	197	17.72%	863	77.61%	39	3.51%	13	1.17%	−666	−59.89%	1,112
Sherman	484	23.59%	1,485	72.37%	58	2.83%	25	1.22%	−1,001	−48.78%	2,052
Smith	403	24.50%	1,163	70.70%	59	3.59%	20	1.22%	−760	−46.20%	1,645
Stafford	458	29.15%	1,039	66.14%	41	2.61%	33	2.10%	−581	−36.98%	1,571
Stanton	124	23.98%	373	72.15%	14	2.71%	6	1.16%	−249	−48.16%	517
Stevens	302	21.56%	1,037	74.02%	40	2.86%	22	1.57%	−735	−52.46%	1,401
Sumner	2,926	37.08%	4,592	58.20%	238	3.02%	134	1.70%	−1,666	−21.12%	7,890
Thomas	782	27.08%	1,995	69.08%	81	2.80%	30	1.04%	−1,213	−42.00%	2,888
Trego	342	27.08%	856	67.78%	49	3.88%	16	1.27%	−514	−40.70%	1,263
Wabaunsee	1,257	37.49%	1,977	58.96%	87	2.59%	32	0.95%	−720	−21.47%	3,353
Wallace	78	11.61%	560	83.33%	23	3.42%	11	1.64%	−482	−71.73%	672
Washington	511	22.64%	1,677	74.30%	54	2.39%	15	0.66%	−1,166	−51.66%	2,257
Wichita	138	19.38%	548	76.97%	22	3.09%	4	0.56%	−410	−57.58%	712
Wilson	769	23.37%	2,405	73.10%	89	2.71%	27	0.82%	−1,636	−49.73%	3,290
Woodson	324	27.34%	833	70.30%	15	1.27%	13	1.10%	−509	−42.95%	1,185
Wyandotte	23,772	67.83%	10,249	29.25%	630	1.80%	393	1.12%	13,523	38.59%	35,044
TOTALS	499,849	49.54%	477,591	47.33%	20,452	2.03%	11,106	1.10%	22,258	2.21%	1,008,998

==== Counties that flipped from Democratic to Republican ====
- Crawford (largest city: Pittsburg)
- Harvey (largest city: Newton)

==== Counties that flipped from Republican to Democratic ====
- Geary (largest city: Junction City)

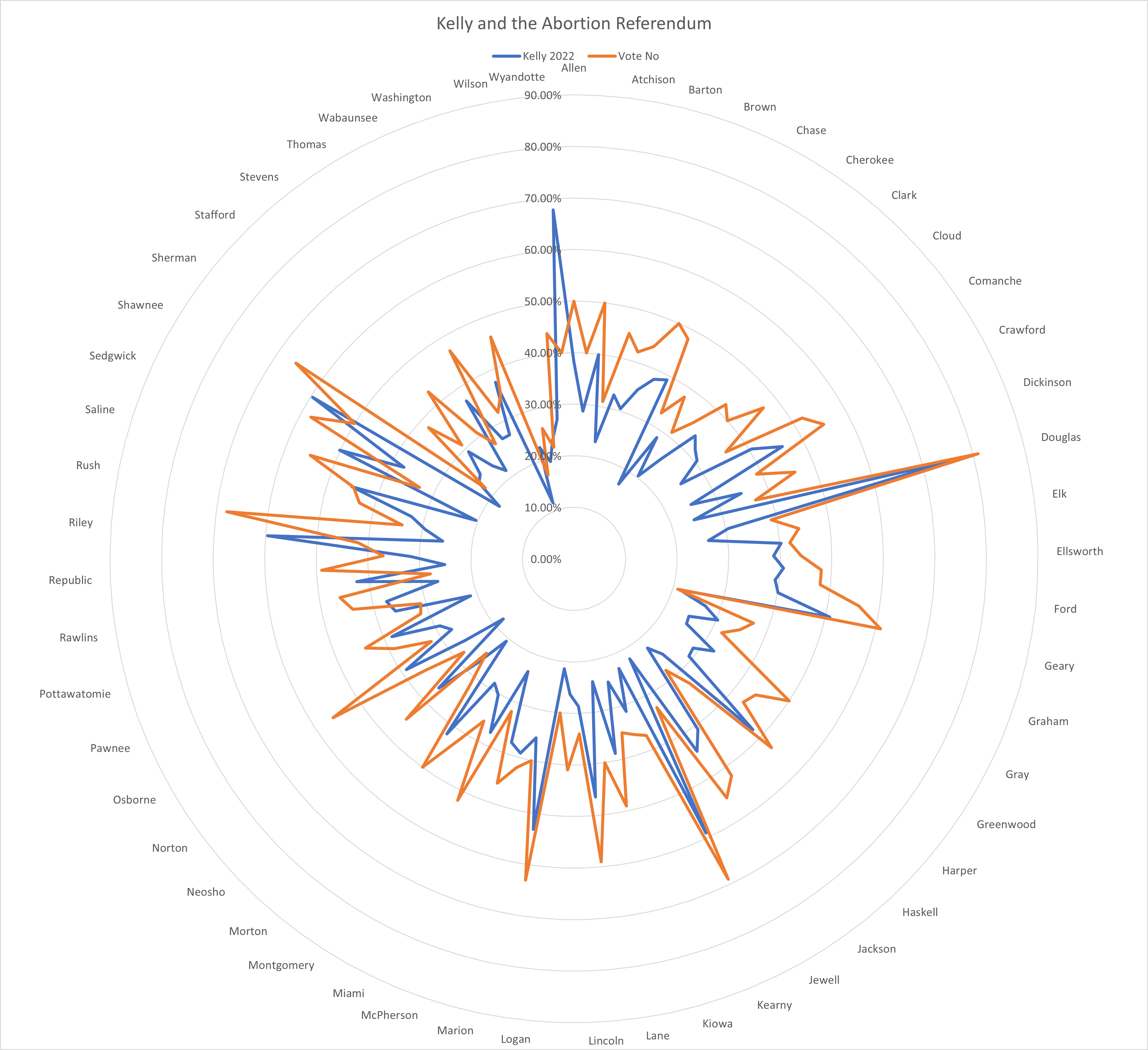
Radar chart contrasting Laura Kelly's 2022 performance with Vote No in 2022 Kansas abortion referendum

==== By congressional district ====
Kelly won two of four congressional districts, including one that elected a Republican.

District	Kelly	Schmidt	Representative
1st	44%	52%	Tracey Mann
2nd	49%	48%	Jake LaTurner
3rd	57%	40%	Sharice Davids
4th	46%	51%	Ron Estes

== Analysis ==
Laura Kelly won the election by a margin of 2.2 percentage points over Derek Schmidt, similar to the percentage of votes that independent Dennis Pyle received. Kansas Republican Party Chair Mike Kuckelman pointed to this as evidence that Pyle was somewhat responsible for Schmidt's defeat. However, Pyle insisted that "Kansas needed a strong conservative candidate" and instead highlighted Schmidt's underperformance compared to other Republican candidates in Kansas. This was the first election since 2002 where the winner of the United States Senate election in Kansas was of a different party from the winner of the concurrent gubernatorial election.

Kelly's personal popularity was also a factor in her victory, where a majority of voters approved of Kelly's job performance, while only a third did so for President Joe Biden. Her win was also propelled by Democratic candidates' increased strength in suburban areas, such as Johnson County, in spite of Schmidt's increased vote share from 2018 in the Republican strongholds of rural Kansas. Kelly also won Sedgwick County, home of Wichita, by 2.9%, receiving 1.8% more of the vote than in the 2018 Kansas gubernatorial election. According to a survey conducted by NORC and published by Fox News, Kelly won independent voters by double-digit margins, which contributed to Schmidt's defeat.

=== Exit polls ===
According to Fox News's voter analysis of the 2022 race, Kelly won women voters (51% Kelly, 45% Schmidt), voters 18–29 (51% Kelly, 43% Schmidt), millennials (55%, 39%), Gen X (50%, 47%), college-educated voters (57%, 40%), and Latino/Hispanic voters (58%).

Kelly lost voters who were concerned about inflation by four points (46%). She lost voters who listed groceries and food as their most important inflation concern by one point. 69% of voters listed abortion as an important factor in their vote, and Kelly won this group by 24 points (60%, 36%), closely mirroring the results of the 2022 Kansas abortion referendum. She won voters who listed "the future of democracy in this country" as an important factor in their vote (88% of voters) by seven points (52%).

== See also ==
- Elections in Kansas
- Political party strength in Kansas
- Kansas Democratic Party
- Kansas Republican Party
- Government of Kansas
- 2022 United States Senate election in Kansas
- 2022 United States House of Representatives elections in Kansas
- 2022 Kansas House of Representatives election
- 2022 Kansas elections
- 2022 United States gubernatorial elections
- 2022 United States elections

== Notes ==
Partisan clients
