= Kansas's 19th Senate district =

American legislative district

Kansas's 19th State Senate district
Senator
Patrick Schmidt; D–Topeka
- Demographics: 69% White; 11% Black; 16% Hispanic; 0% Asian; 1% Native American; 3% Other
- Population (2018): 69,433

Kansas's 19th Senate district is one of 40 districts in the Kansas Senate. It had been represented by Democrat Patrick Schmidt since 2025.

== Geography ==
District 19 covers all of Osage County and parts of Douglas, Jefferson, and Shawnee Counties, including much of eastern Topeka and southern Lawrence as well as Osage City, Carbondale, Lyndon, and Overbrook.

The district is located entirely within Kansas's 2nd congressional district, and overlaps with the 10th, 45th, 47th, 54th, 56th, 57th, 58th, 59th, and 76th districts of the Kansas House of Representatives.

== Recent election results ==
=== 2024 ===
2024 Kansas Senate election, District 19
Party	Candidate	Votes	%
Democratic	Patrick Schmidt	16,784	64.6
Republican	Tyler Wible	9,216	35.4
Total votes		26,000	100
Democratic gain from Republican			

=== 2020 ===
2020 Kansas Senate election, District 19
Party	Candidate	Votes	%
Republican	Rick Kloos	16,141	51.0
Democratic	Anthony Hensley (incumbent)	15,483	49.0
Total votes		31,624	100
Republican gain from Democratic			

=== 2016 ===
2016 Kansas Senate election, District 19
Party	Candidate	Votes	%
Democratic	Anthony Hensley (incumbent)	16,181	57.3
Republican	Zach Haney	12,068	42.7
Total votes		28,249	100
Democratic hold			

=== 2012 ===
2012 Kansas Senate election, District 19
Primary election
Party	Candidate	Votes	%
Republican	Casey Moore	4,238	81.3
Republican	Matthew Windheuser	978	18.7
Total votes		5,216	100
General election
Democratic	Anthony Hensley (incumbent)	16,543	58.5
Republican	Casey Moore	11,756	41.5
Total votes		28,299	100
Democratic hold			

=== Federal and statewide results ===
Year	Office	Results
2020	President	Trump 51.2 – 46.3%
2018	Governor	Kelly 55.2 – 35.3%
2016	President	Trump 50.7 – 42.6%
2012	President	Romney 48.9 – 48.6%
