= Kansas's 1st Senate district =

American legislative district

Kansas's 1st State Senate district
Senator
Craig Bowser; R–Holton
- Demographics: 88% White; 2% Black; 3% Hispanic; 2% Native American; 4% Multiracial
- Population (2023): 71,869

Kansas's 1st Senate district is one of 40 districts in the Kansas Senate. The district has been represented by Republican Craig Bowser since 2025.

== Geography ==
=== 2012–2020 ===
District 1 is based in the northeastern corner of the state, covering all of Atchison, Brown, Doniphan, Jackson, Marshall, Nemaha, and Pottawatomie counties. Communities in the district include Atchison, Holton, Hiawatha, Sabetha, Seneca, Horton, Wathena, Troy, Elwood, and a small part of Manhattan.

The district overlaps with Kansas's 1st and 2nd congressional districts, and with the 51st, 61st, 62nd, 63rd, and 106th districts of the Kansas House of Representatives. It borders the states of Missouri and Nebraska.

=== 2022–2030 ===
The district includes all of Atchison, Brown, Doniphan, Jackson, and Nemaha counties, and portions of Jefferson, Leavenworth, and Marshall counties.

== Recent election results ==
=== 2024 ===
2024 Kansas Senate election, District 1
Party	Candidate	Votes	%
Republican	Craig Bowser	29,530	100.0
Total votes		29,530	100.0
Republican hold			

=== 2020 ===
2020 Kansas Senate election, District 1
Party	Candidate	Votes	%
Republican	Dennis Pyle (incumbent)	25,173	71.7
Democratic	Kirk Miller	9,914	28.3
Total votes		35,087	100
Republican hold			

=== 2016 ===
2016 Kansas Senate election, District 1
Party	Candidate	Votes	%
Republican	Dennis Pyle (incumbent)	18,283	58.3
Democratic	Jerry Henry	13,076	41.7
Total votes		31,359	100
Republican hold			

=== 2012 ===
2012 Kansas Senate election, District 1
Primary election
Party	Candidate	Votes	%
Republican	Dennis Pyle (incumbent)	6,730	66.4
Republican	Marje Cochren	3,407	33.6
Total votes		10,137	100
General election
Republican	Dennis Pyle (incumbent)	15,378	50.7
Democratic	Steve Lukert	14,982	49.3
Total votes		30,360	100
Republican hold			

=== Federal and statewide results ===
Year	Office	Results
2020	President	Trump 73.3 – 24.4%
2018	Governor	Kobach 51.8 – 37.2%
2016	President	Trump 71.0 – 22.7%
2012	President	Romney 68.2 – 29.4%
