= Kansas Senate =

Upper House of the Kansas government

Coordinates: 39°02′54″N 95°40′41″W

- Kansas Legislature

Type
- Type: Upper house
- Term limits: None

History
- New session started: January 13, 2025

Leadership
- President: Ty Masterson (R) since January 11, 2021
- Vice President: Tim Shallenburger (R) since January 10, 2025
- Majority Leader: Chase Blasi (R) since January 10, 2025
- Minority Leader: Dinah Sykes (D) since January 11, 2021

Structure
- Seats: 40
- Political groups: Majority: Republican (31); Minority: Democratic (9)
- Length of term: 4 years
- Authority: Article 2, Kansas Constitution
- Salary: $88.66/day + per diem

Elections
- Last election: November 5, 2024 (40 seats)
- Next election: November 7, 2028 (40 seats)
- Redistricting: Kansas Reapportionment Commission

Meeting place
- State Senate Chamber; Kansas State Capitol; Topeka, Kansas

Rules
- Rules of the Kansas Senate

The Kansas Senate is the upper house of the Kansas Legislature, the state legislature of the U.S. state of Kansas. It is composed of 40 senators elected from single-member districts, each with a population of about 73,000 inhabitants. Members of the Senate are elected to a four-year term. There is no limit to the number of terms that a senator may serve. The Kansas Senate meets at the Kansas State Capitol in Topeka.

Like other upper houses of state and territorial legislatures and the federal U.S. Senate, the Senate is reserved with special functions such as confirming or rejecting gubernatorial appointments to executive departments, the state cabinet, commissions and boards.

== History ==
The Kansas Senate was created by the Kansas Constitution when Kansas became the 34th state of United States on January 29, 1861. Six days after its admission into the Union, the Confederate States of America formed between seven Southern states that had seceded from the United States in the previous months, leading to the American Civil War.

War bonds became a central political issue in Kansas shortly when the Kansas Senate held impeachment trials in 1862, brought about in part by United States Republican Party infighting. The Kansas Senate voted narrowly to convict Kansas secretary of state J. W. Robinson, and State Auditor George S. Hillyer over what they believed to be the unlawful sale of state bonds. With little evidence of a conspiracy and the smaller role of Governor Charles L. Robinson, his impeachment trial ended with only three state senators voting to convict him.

The state legislature met in a building known as the Old Constitutional Hall until their offices were moved to the east wing of the Kansas State Capitol in 1869, which was still undergoing construction. The Kansas Senate first met there in 1870, though the east wing was not completed until 1873. Work would continue on the building until March 24, 1903.

Prohibitionist, Progressive and Populist movements rose in Kansas in the late 19th century. On February 19, 1881, Kansas became the first state to amend its constitution to prohibit alcoholic beverages. After 1890, prohibition was joined with progressivism to create a reform movement. The Populist Party won the governor's office and control of the Kansas Senate in 1892. Although they did not gain control of the Kansas House of Representatives, the Populists went ahead and claimed it, alleging election fraud. This led to a legislative war between the two parties and eventually ended with a Kansas Supreme Court decision against the Populist faction of the Kansas House.

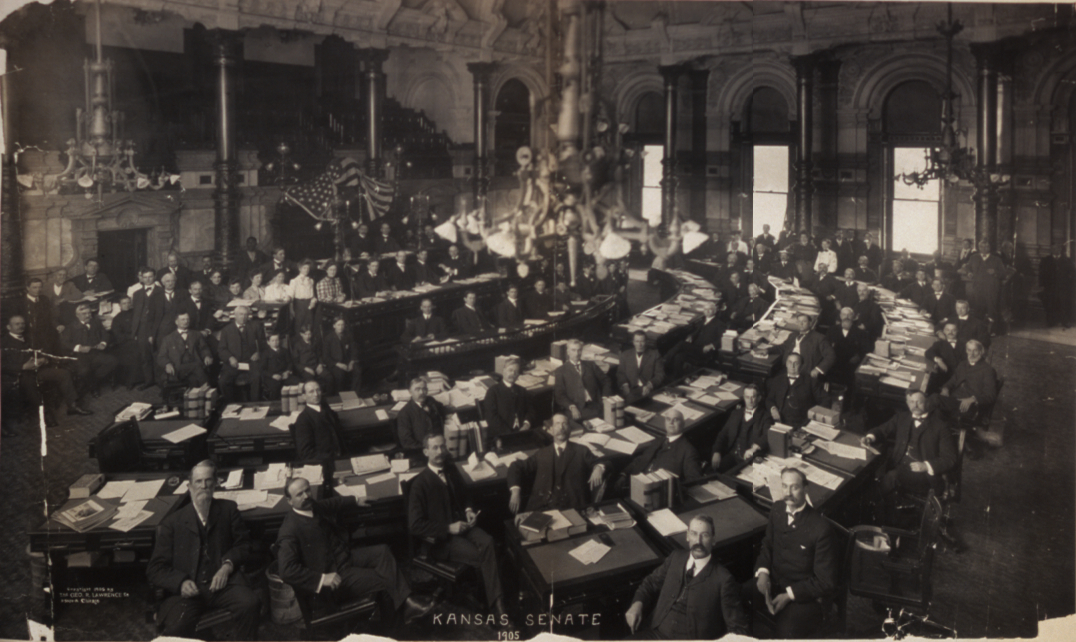
The Kansas Senate chamber in 1905

The Kansas Senate helped enact a law in 1905 to restrict children under 14 from working in factories, meatpacking houses, or mines.

With the help of progressive state senators, women gained the right to vote through a constitutional amendment approved by Kansans on November 5, 1912.

Democrats only gained control of the Kansas Senate briefly in the early 1900s and haven't held it since 1917.

Since 1966, the Kansas Legislature holds annual general sessions. A constitutional amendment adopted at the 1974 general election extended the duration of the session held in the even-numbered years from 60 to 90 calendar days, subject to extension by a vote of two-thirds of the elected membership of each house.

In the 2000s the Kansas Democratic Party was able to win statewide offices and make gains in the Kansas Senate by benefiting from tension in the Kansas Republican Party between its conservative and moderate wings.

== Legislative procedure ==
Terms begin and the legislature commences on the second Monday in January following the general election. Senators introduce a proposed law in the Senate in the form of a bill, which must be approved by a standing committee, the Committee of the Whole and the entire membership of the chamber. Bills are subject to amendment by other senators in committee or on the floor of the chamber.

A bill must be approved by both houses of the Kansas Legislature in order to be submitted to the governor, who can sign it into law or veto the bill. Legislators can override a veto with the support of two-thirds majority of both houses.

== Leadership ==
The president of the Senate presides over the body, is a member of the Organization, Calendar and Rules Committee that appoints members to the remaining Kansas Senate committees and joint committees and has the power to create other committees and subcommittees. Unlike many other states, the lieutenant governor of Kansas does not preside over the state senate. Since a 1972 amendment to the Kansas Constitution, the lieutenant governor's duties have been severed from the legislative branch, and is active in other areas of the Kansas state government such as commissions on military affairs and health insurance. In the senate president's absence, the senate vice-president presides. The president of the Kansas Senate assigns proposed bills to committees and the majority leader determines the calendar and order of bills to be debated on the floor of the Kansas Senate. The Organization, Rules and Calendar Committee is made up of the president, vice-president, majority leader, assistant majority leader, minority leader and four senators elected by the majority caucus.

The current president of the Senate is Republican Ty Masterson of District 16 (Wichita). The Senate Majority Leader is Chase Blasi of District 26 (Wichita). The Senate Minority Leader is Democrat Dinah Sykes of District 21 (Lenexa).

== Party composition ==
Map of current (August 2024) partisan composition of legislative districts for state senate: Republican senator Democratic senator

Affiliation	Party (Shading indicates majority caucus)			Total	Vacant
Affiliation	Republican	Independent	Democratic	Total	Vacant
End 2008	30	0	10	40	0
Begin (January 2009)	31	0	9	40	0
End 2012 (Note: Chris Steineger switched parties from Democratic to Republican in December 2010.)	32	0	8	40	0
2013–2016	32	0	8	40	0
Begin (2017)	31	0	9	40	0
End (2020)	29	0	11	40	0
2021–2024	28	1	11	40	0
Begin 2025	31	0	9	40	0
June 2, 2025	30	0	9	39	1
June 26, 2025	31	0	9	40	0
November 13, 2025	31	0	8	39	1
December 22, 2025	31	0	9	40	0
Latest voting share	77.5%	22.5%			

=== Officers ===
Position	Name	Party
President of the Senate	Ty Masterson	Republican
Vice President of the Senate	Tim Shallenburger	Republican
Majority Leader	Chase Blasi	Republican
Assistant Majority Leader	Caryn Tyson	Republican
Majority Whip	Rick Kloos	Republican
Minority Leader	Dinah Sykes	Democratic
Assistant Minority Leader	Oletha Faust-Goudeau	Democratic
Minority Whip	Cindy Holscher	Democratic
Agenda Chair	Marci Francisco	Democratic
Caucus Chair	Ethan Corson	Democratic

=== List of current senators ===
District	Name	Party	Start	Residence	Counties
1	Craig Bowser	Republican	2025	Holton	Atchison, Brown, Doniphan, Jackson, Jefferson, Leavenworth, Marshall, Nemaha
2	Marci Francisco	Democratic	2005	Lawrence	Douglas
3	Rick Kloos	Republican	2021	Berryton	Douglas, Franklin, Osage, Shawnee
4	David Haley	Democratic	2001	Kansas City	Wyandotte
5	Jeff Klemp	Republican	2025	Lansing	Leavenworth, Wyandotte
6	Pat Pettey	Democratic	2013	Kansas City	Johnson, Wyandotte
7	Ethan Corson	Democratic	2021	Prairie Village	Johnson
8	Cindy Holscher	Democratic	2021	Overland Park	Johnson
9	Beverly Gossage	Republican	2021	Eudora	Douglas, Johnson, Leavenworth, Wyandotte
10	Mike Thompson	Republican	2020	Shawnee	Johnson
11	Kellie Warren	Republican	2021	Leawood	Johnson
12	Caryn Tyson	Republican	2013	Parker	Allen, Anderson, Coffey, Franklin, Linn, Miami, Wilson, Woodson
13	Tim Shallenburger	Republican	2023	Baxter Springs	Bourbon, Cherokee, Crawford
14	Michael Fagg	Republican	2021	El Dorado	Butler, Chase, Greenwood, Marion, McPherson
15	Virgil Peck Jr.	Republican	2021	Havana	Chautauqua, Elk, Labette, Montgomery, Neosho
16	Ty Masterson	Republican	2009	Andover	Butler, Sedgwick
17	Mike Argabright	Republican	2025	Olpe	Geary, Lyon, Morris
18	Kenny Titus	Republican	2025	Wamego	Jefferson, Pottawatomie, Shawnee
19	Patrick Schmidt	Democratic	2025	Topeka	Douglas, Shawnee
20	Brenda Dietrich	Republican	2021	Topeka	Shawnee, Wabaunsee
21	Dinah Sykes	Democratic	2017	Lenexa	Johnson
22	Brad Starnes	Republican	2025	Riley	Riley
23	Adam Thomas	Republican	2025	Olathe	Johnson, Miami
24	Scott Hill	Republican	2025	Abilene	Dickinson, Saline
25	Silas Miller	Democratic	2025	Wichita	Sedgwick
26	Chase Blasi	Republican	2023	Wichita	Sedgwick
27	Joe Claeys	Republican	2025	Maize	Sedgwick
28	Mike Petersen	Republican	2005	Wichita	Sedgwick
29	Oletha Faust-Goudeau	Democratic	2009	Wichita	Sedgwick
30	Renee Erickson	Republican	2021	Wichita	Sedgwick, Sumner
31	Stephen Owens	Republican	2025	Hesston	Harvey, Sedgwick
32	Larry Alley	Republican	2017	Winfield	Butler, Cowley, Harper, Sumner
33	Tory Marie Blew	Republican	2025	Great Bend	Barton, Comanche, Edwards, Ellsworth, Kiowa, Ness, Pawnee, Pratt, Rice, Rush, Stafford
34	Michael Murphy	Republican	2025	Sylvia	Barber, Kingman, Reno
35	T. J. Rose	Republican	2025	Olathe	Johnson
36	Elaine Bowers	Republican	2013	Concordia	Clay, Cloud, Jewell, Lincoln, Marshall, Mitchell, Osborne, Ottawa, Phillips, Republic, Rooks, Russell, Smith, Washington
37	Doug Shane	Republican	2025	Louisburg	Johnson, Miami
38	Ron Ryckman Sr.	Republican	2021	Meade	Clark, Ford, Gray, Haskell, Hodgeman, Meade, Seward
39	Bill Clifford	Republican	2025	Garden City	Finney, Grant, Greeley, Hamilton, Kearny, Lane, Morton, Scott, Stanton, Stevens, Wichita
40	Rick Billinger	Republican	2017	Goodland	Cheyenne, Decatur, Ellis, Gove, Graham, Logan, Norton, Phillips, Rawlins, Sheridan, Sherman, Thomas, Trego, Wallace

== See also ==
- List of Kansas state legislatures
