= Dennis Pyle =

American politician (born 1961)

Member of the Kansas Senate from the 1st district
- In office January 10, 2005 – January 13, 2025
- Preceded by: Edward W. Pugh
- Succeeded by: Craig Bowser

Member of the Kansas House of Representatives from the 49th district
- In office January 8, 2001 – January 13, 2003
- Preceded by: Galen Weiland
- Succeeded by: Scott Schwab

Personal details
- Born: February 4, 1961 (age 65) Hiawatha, Kansas, U.S.
- Party: Republican (before 2022, 2024–present); Independent (2022–2024)
- Spouse: Jennifer Pyle
- Children: 6
- Education: Grace University
- Website: Campaign website

Dennis D. Pyle (born February 4, 1961) is an American politician who served as a Republican member of the Kansas Senate, representing the 1st district from 2005 to 2025. He ran for governor of Kansas in the 2022 election.

== Legislative career ==
Pyle was a member of the Kansas House of Representatives for the 49th district from 2001 to 2003. He lost a race for reelection to Republican Scott Schwab, who later became the Kansas Secretary of State, but was elected to his Kansas Senate seat in 2004. In 2020, he won his third reelection to his first district position in northeast Kansas with over 70% of the vote.

=== Committee assignments ===
Pyle served on these legislative committees: but was removed by Senate President Ty Masterson from some of those assignments during the 2022 legislative session when he refused to vote for the Kansas Republican Party's congressional redistricting map.

- Agriculture
- Assessment and Taxation
- Children's Issues
- Special Claims Against the State
- State-Tribal Relations
- Utilities

=== Sponsored legislation ===
Pyle's sponsored bills have included:

- A bill promoting trade between Kansas and Taiwan.
- A bill regarding income tax credit for some property taxes.

=== Major donors ===
The top contributors to Pyle's 2008 campaign, according to OpenSecrets were the Kansas Republican Senatorial Committee, State of Kansas Department of Administration, Kansas Medical Society, Brown County Republican Central Committee, Kansas Republican Senatorial Committee Party.

== Congressional campaigns ==
In 2010, Pyle challenged incumbent Representative Lynn Jenkins in the Republican primary for Kansas's 2nd congressional district. He received 43% of the vote. He ran again for the seat in a crowded field in 2018, as Jenkins was retiring, but the race was won by self-financed, one-term Republican Steve Watkins.

=== Ethics complaint ===
On June 5, 2010, it was made public that a formal ethics complaint had been filed against Pyle, "alleging improper expenditures from his Senate campaign account on a trip to Washington, D.C., to evaluate support for his challenge of U.S. Rep. Lynn Jenkins." The complaint specifically alleged "Pyle violated state campaign finance laws by using money raised for a state campaign for activities related to possible federal campaign." On June 28, 2010, Pyle was cleared of any wrongdoing.

== 2022 gubernatorial campaign ==
On June 7, 2022, Pyle announced his plan to pursue a campaign for the office of Governor of Kansas because he said, "I am a God-loving American, devoted to the Constitution and protecting our children, and I am entering this race to give Kansans a choice". To reach the ballot requires 5,000 signatures as verified by the three-member Kansas Objections Board. The Board includes the Kansas Secretary of State, Republican Scott Schwab and Attorney General and Republican gubernatorial candidate Derek Schmidt, along with the governor's General Counsel. The situation with Board's potential conflicts has been scrutinized for some time, in particular by former State Senator Anthony Hensley. In August, Pyle turned in almost 9,000 signatures for review.

C.J. Grover, the campaign manager for Republican Kansas Attorney General Derek Schmidt, labeled Pyle as a "fake conservative" "who just wants attention." "He stood with pro-abortion legislators to nearly derail the 'Value Them Both' amendment," adding, "...he sided with (Governor) Laura Kelly, Hillary Clinton's lawyers and the ACLU against our Republican majority in the Legislature on redistricting maps." "Now, he's trying to help Laura Kelly and Joe Biden again with a vanity run for governor." Kansas Republican Party Executive Director Shannon Pahls said Pyle is "knowingly providing Laura Kelly the only path to a second term." Pyle in turn described Schmidt and Kelly as "two peas in a pod." The Republican party launched an effort to get signers of Pyle's ballot inclusion petition to withdraw their signatures. On August 25, 2022, the Kansas Secretary of State announced that he collected enough valid signatures to be placed on the ballot.

Ultimately, Pyle was not a major factor in the race, receiving just 2% of the vote as Democratic incumbent governor Laura Kelly was re-elected.

== 2024 Kansas primary election ==
Despite changing his affiliation to Independent prior to his candidacy in the 2022 Kansas gubernatorial election, Pyle later reverted his affiliation back to the Republican Party to run for re-election to the state Senate. On August 6, 2024, Pyle was defeated in a three-way Republican primary. Pyle placed third in the primary with 22.8% of the vote, thereby losing to Craig Bowser, who went on to win the general election.

== Personal life ==
Pyle attended Hiawatha High School and Grace College of the Bible. He is married to Jennifer Pyle, and they farm in Hiawatha. They have six daughters.

Kansas House of Representatives
Preceded by Galen Weiland	Member of the Kansas House of Representatives from the 49th district 2001–2003	Succeeded by Scott Schwab
Kansas Senate
Preceded by Edward W. Pugh	Member of the Kansas Senate from the 1st district 2005–2025	Succeeded by Craig Bowser
