= Tony Brown =

Tony Brown may refer to:

== Sports ==
=== American football ===
- Tony Brown (offensive lineman) (1964–2010), American footballer
- Tony Brown (defensive back, born 1970), American footballer
- Tony Brown (defensive tackle) (born 1980), American footballer
- Tony Brown (defensive back, born 1995), American footballer
- Tony Brown (wide receiver) (born 1997), American footballer

=== Association football ===
- Tony Brown (footballer, born 1945), English forward
- Tony Brown (footballer, born 1958), English centre-back

=== Rugby ===
- Tony Brown (rugby league) (1936–2022), Australian rugby league footballer
- Tony Brown (rugby union) (born 1975), New Zealand rugby union footballer

=== Other sports ===
- Tony Brown (English cricketer) (1936–2020), English cricketer and administrator
- Tony Brown (darts player) (1945–2022), English darts player
- Tony Brown (basketball) (born 1960), American basketball player and coach
- Tony Brown (Australian rules footballer) (born 1977)

== Others ==
- Tony Brown (journalist) (1933–2026), American commentator and radio talk show host
- Tony Brown (record producer) (born 1946), American country music producer and musician
- Tony Brown (Manx politician) (born 1950), Chief Minister of the Isle of Man
- Tony Brown (Kansas politician) (born 1961), Democratic member of the Kansas House of Representatives
- Tony Brown, artist and artistic director of Margolis Brown Adaptors Company

== See also ==
- Anthony Brown (disambiguation)
- Anthony Browne (disambiguation)
- Tony Browne (disambiguation)
- Antonio Brown (born 1988), American football wide receiver
- Antonio Brown (wide receiver, born 1978)
