= Mark Buhler =

American politician (born 1954)

Member of the Kansas Senate from the 2nd district
- In office 2003–2004
- Preceded by: Sandy Praeger
- Succeeded by: Marci Francisco

Personal details
- Born: June 16, 1954 (age 72)
- Party: Republican
- Spouse: Marsha Buhler

Mark Buhler (born June 16, 1954) is an American politician who served as the Kansas State Senator from the 2nd district from 2002 to 2004.

== Political career ==
In December 2002, the Douglas County Republican Central Committee chose Buhler to fill the seat left vacant by Sandy Praeger, who was elected as Kansas Insurance Commissioner in November of that year. His victory in the Central Committee was narrow; Buhler received 47 votes out of 91 cast, one more than required for a majority. State Representative Tom Sloan received 39. Buhler stressed party unity after his selection, saying "We’re a party of a bunch of people. Let’s all remember we’re Republicans and we’ll go get the other guys later".

Buhler ran for re-election in his own right in 2004, but lost to Democrat Marci Francisco. Buhler's re-election prospects were harmed when Jim Mullins, a prominent conservative Republican leader, switched parties and ran in the general election under the Reform Party banner. Mullins opposed Buhler because of Buhler's opposition to a state constitutional amendment banning gay marriage, as well as his votes to increase taxes to pay for public schools. In the November general election, Francisco triumphed with 51% of the vote, while Buhler received 43% and Mullins took 6%.

After the election, Buhler continued to feud with the conservative faction in Kansas Republican politics; in 2014, he appeared at a fundraiser for Jean Schodorf, the Democratic nominee for Kansas Secretary of State who faced off against the highly conservative Republican Kris Kobach. Buhler said "I am a Republican, and I believe in basic Republican values, so this is a hard thing for me to do by nature," and "[Kobach] tries to find problems that aren't there, and people that do that drive me crazy. This world's hard enough." In particular, Buhler objected to what he characterized as Kobach's overzealous efforts to police voting in the state.

== Personal life ==
In addition to his state legislature service, Buhler spent over 30 years as a real estate broker. He is married to Marsha Buhler.
