= 2018 Kansas elections =

- November 6, 2018

A general election was held in the state of Kansas on November 6, 2018. Primary elections were held on August 7, 2018.

Voters elected all six executive officers, the lower house of the state legislature, and all of the state's delegations to the U.S. House.

== U.S. House of Representatives ==
Kansas elected four U.S. representatives, one for each congressional districts. In 2018, the delegation's Republican majority changed from 4–0 to 3–1, the first time Democrats had held a seat in the state since 2010.

District	Republican nominee		Democratic nominee		Libertarian nominee	
District 1	Roger Marshall (i)	68.15	Alan LaPolice	31.85		
District 2	Steve Watkins	47.64	Paul Davis	46.80	Kelly Standley	5.57
District 3	Kevin Yoder (i)	43.91	Sharice Davids	53.57	Chris Clemmons	2.52
District 4	Ron Estes (i)	59.44	James Thompson	40.56		

== Governor and lieutenant governor ==
Incumbent Republicans Jeff Colyer and Tracey Mann lost their party's renomination in a tight primary election won by Secretary of State Kris Kobach and businessman Wink Hartman by a margin of around 0.1 percent. Democrats nominated state senators Laura Kelly and Lynn Rogers, with businessman Greg Orman and state senator John Doll joining the race as independents. Polls leading up to the election had Kobach and Kelly running close, leading to many news outlets predicting a tossup election.

Kelly won the election, beating Kobach by five percentage points. Kelly became the oldest governor in Kansas history, taking office at the age of 68.

2018 Kansas gubernatorial election
Party	Candidate	Votes	%	±%
Democratic	Laura Kelly / Lynn Rogers	506,727	48.01	▲1.88
Republican	Kris Kobach / Wink Hartman	453,645	42.98	▼6.84
Independent	Greg Orman / John Doll	68,590	6.50	
Libertarian	Jeff Caldwell / Mary Gerlt	20,020	1.90	▲2.15
Independent	Rick Kloos / Nathaniel Kloos	6,584	0.62	
Total votes		1,055,566	100.00	
Democratic gain from Republican				

== Secretary of state ==
2018 Kansas Secretary of State election
- November 6, 2018
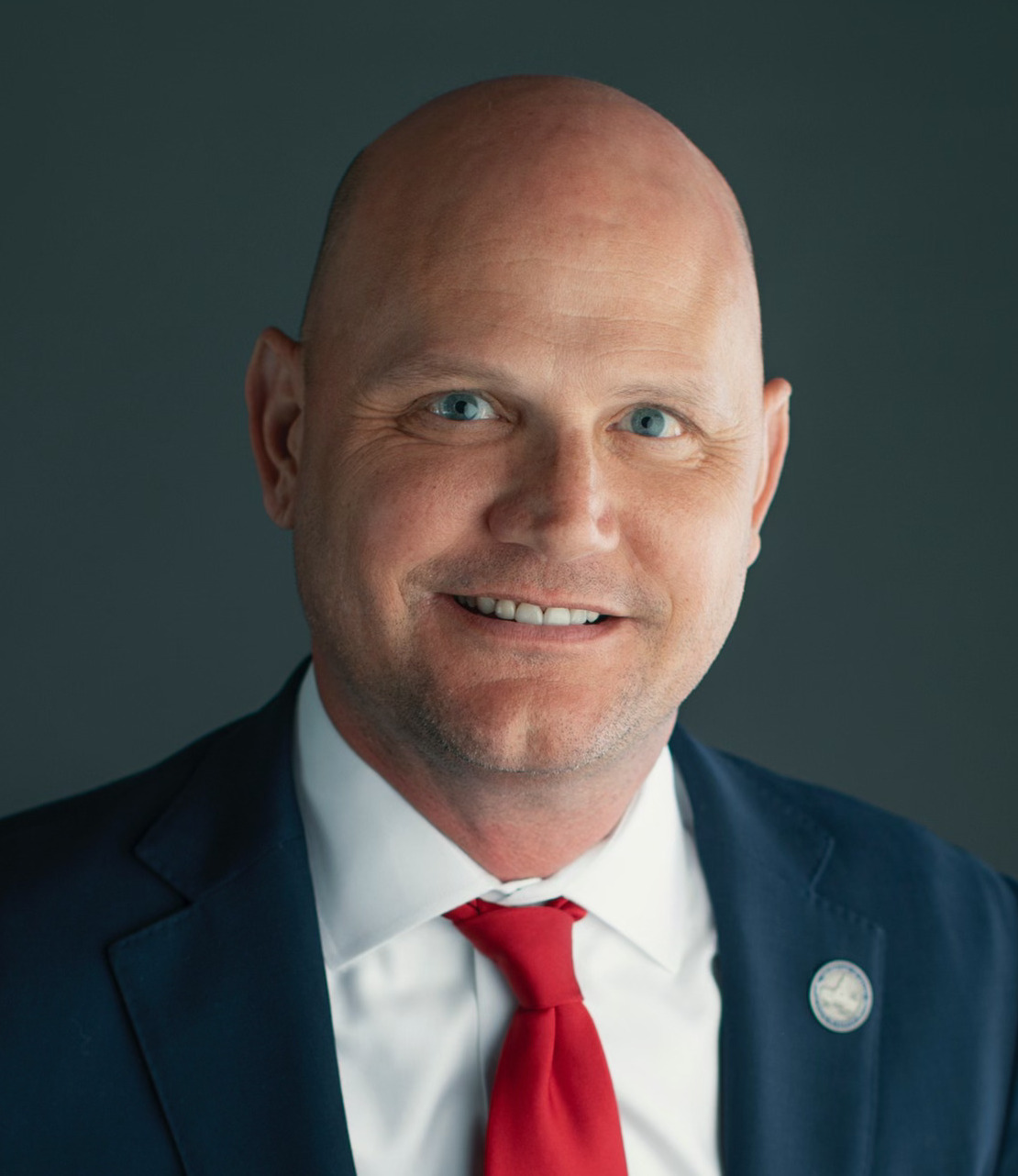

Nominee	Scott Schwab	Brian McClendon
Party	Republican	Democratic
Popular vote	549,416	458,142
Percentage	52.60%	43.87%
- Schwab: 40–50% 50–60% 60–70% 70–80% 80–90% McClendon: 40–50% 50–60% 60–70% 70–80%
Secretary of State before election
Kris Kobach
Republican
Elected Secretary of State
Scott Schwab
Republican

Incumbent Republican secretary of state Kris Kobach retired to run for governor, leaving the seat open. State representative Scott Schwab won the Republican primary amidst a number of candidates, while Democratic nominee Brian McClendon ran unopposed after his challengers withdrew. Schwab won the election.

=== Republican primary ===
Republican primary
Party	Candidate	Votes	%
Republican	Scott Schwab	108,705	38.34
Republican	Randy Duncan	57,236	20.19
Republican	Dennis Taylor	56,537	19.94
Republican	Craig McCullah	32,615	11.50
Republican	Keith Esau	28,426	10.03
Total votes		283,519	100.00

=== Democratic primary ===
Democratic primary
Party	Candidate	Votes	%
Democratic	Brian McClendon	139,457	100.00
Total votes		139,457	100.00

=== General election ===
==== Predictions ====
Source	Ranking	As of
Governing	Tossup	October 11, 2018

==== Results ====
2018 Kansas Secretary of State election
Party	Candidate	Votes	%	±%
Republican	Scott Schwab	549,416	52.60	▼6.57
Democratic	Brian McClendon	458,142	43.87	▲3.04
Libertarian	Rob Hodgkinson	36,882	3.53	
Total votes		1,044,440	100.00	
Republican hold				

== Attorney general ==
2018 Kansas Attorney General election
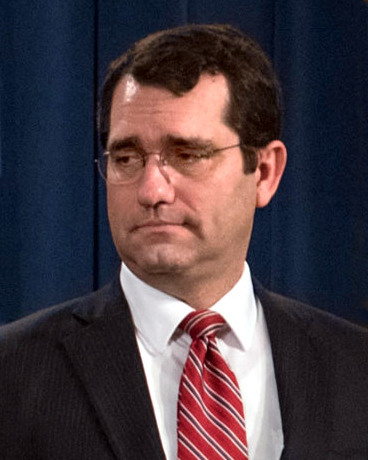

Nominee	Derek Schmidt	Sarah Swain
Party	Republican	Democratic
Popular vote	614,436	427,289
Percentage	58.98%	41.02%
- Schmidt: 50–60% 60–70% 70–80% 80–90% >90% Swain: 50–60% 60–70%
Attorney General before election
Derek Schmidt
Republican
Elected Attorney General
Derek Schmidt
Republican

Incumbent Republican attorney general Derek Schmidt ran for re-election to a third term. He successfully defeated Democratic nominee Sarah Swain by 18 points.

=== Republican primary ===
Republican primary
Party	Candidate	Votes	%
Republican	Derek Schmidt (incumbent)	269,212	100.00
Total votes		269,212	100.00

=== Democratic primary ===
Democratic primary
Party	Candidate	Votes	%
Democratic	Sarah Swain	140,503	100.00
Total votes		140,503	100.00

=== General election ===
==== Predictions ====
Source	Ranking	As of
Governing	Safe R	October 26, 2018

==== Results ====
2018 Kansas Attorney General election
Party	Candidate	Votes	%	±%
Republican	Derek Schmidt (incumbent)	614,436	58.98	▼7.79
Democratic	Sarah Swain	427,289	41.02	▲7.79
Total votes		1,041,725	100.00	
Republican hold				

== Treasurer ==
2018 Kansas State Treasurer election
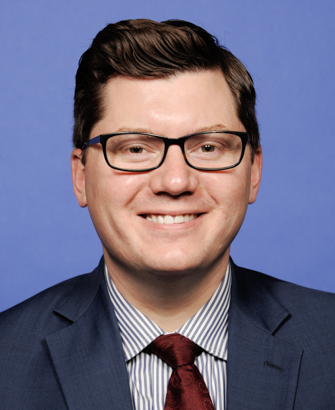

Nominee	Jake LaTurner	Marci Francisco
Party	Republican	Democratic
Popular vote	598,392	437,879
Percentage	57.74%	42.26%
- LaTurner: 50–60% 60–70% 70–80% 80–90% >90% Francisco: 50–60% 60–70% 70–80%
State Treasurer before election
Jake LaTurner
Republican
Elected State Treasurer
Jake LaTurner
Republican

Incumbent Republican treasurer Jake LaTurner was appointed to the office on April 25, 2017, following the resignation of his predecessor Ron Estes to join the U.S. House of Representatives. He ran for election to a full term, defeating his Democratic challenger State Senator Marci Francisco by 15.49 points.

=== Republican primary ===
Republican primary
Party	Candidate	Votes	%
Republican	Jake LaTurner (incumbent)	258,796	100.00
Total votes		258,796	100.00

=== Democratic primary ===
Democratic primary
Party	Candidate	Votes	%
Democratic	Marci Francisco	141,214	100.00
Total votes		141,214	100.00

=== General election ===
2018 Kansas State Treasurer election
Party	Candidate	Votes	%	±%
Republican	Jake LaTurner (incumbent)	598,392	57.74	▼9.78
Democratic	Marci Francisco	437,879	42.26	▲9.78
Total votes		1,036,271	100.00	
Republican hold				

== Insurance commissioner ==
2018 Kansas Insurance Commissioner election
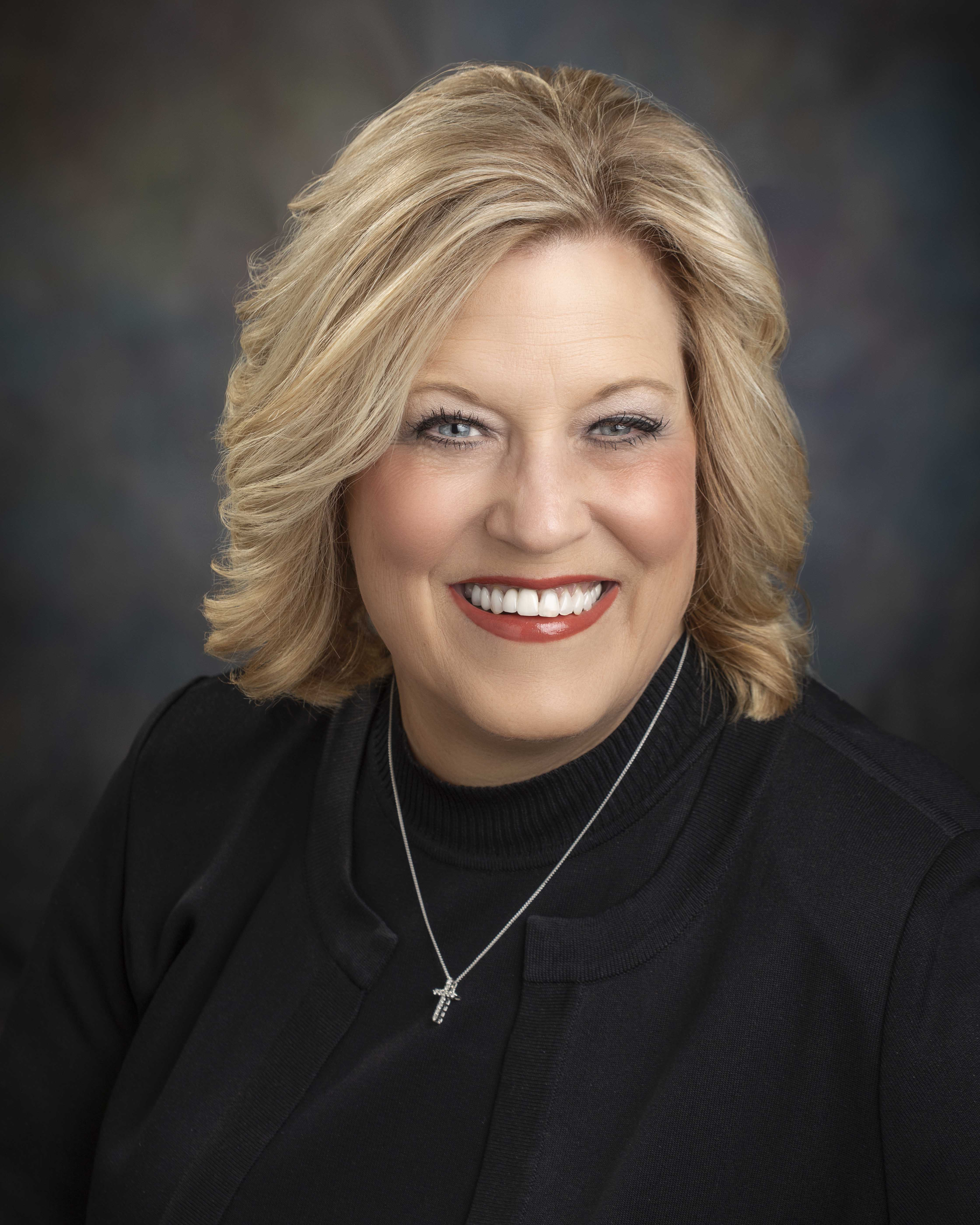

Nominee	Vicki Schmidt	Nathaniel McLaughlin
Party	Republican	Democratic
Popular vote	644,293	380,166
Percentage	62.89%	37.11%
- Schmidt: 50–60% 60–70% 70–80% 80–90% >90% McLaughlin: 60–70%
Insurance Commissioner before election
Ken Selzer
Republican
Elected Insurance Commissioner
Vicki Schmidt
Republican

Incumbent Republican Insurance Commissioner Ken Selzer retired to run for governor, leaving the seat open. Republican state senators Vicki Schmidt and Clark Shultz competed in a close primary, with Schmidt winning the nomination. The Democratic nominee was president of the Kansas NAACP Nathaniel McLaughlin. Schmidt won the election with the highest vote percentage of any statewide candidate.

=== Republican primary ===
Republican primary
Party	Candidate	Votes	%
Republican	Vicki Schmidt	152,706	52.01
Republican	Clark Shultz	140,887	47.99
Total votes		293,593	100.00

=== Democratic primary ===
Democratic primary
Party	Candidate	Votes	%
Democratic	Nathaniel McLaughlin	138,941	100.00
Total votes		138,941	100.00

=== General election ===
2018 Kansas Insurance Commissioner election
Party	Candidate	Votes	%	±%
Republican	Vicki Schmidt	644,293	62.89	▲1.38
Democratic	Nathaniel McLaughlin	380,166	37.11	▼1.38
Total votes		1,024,459	100.00	
Republican hold				

== State House of Representatives ==
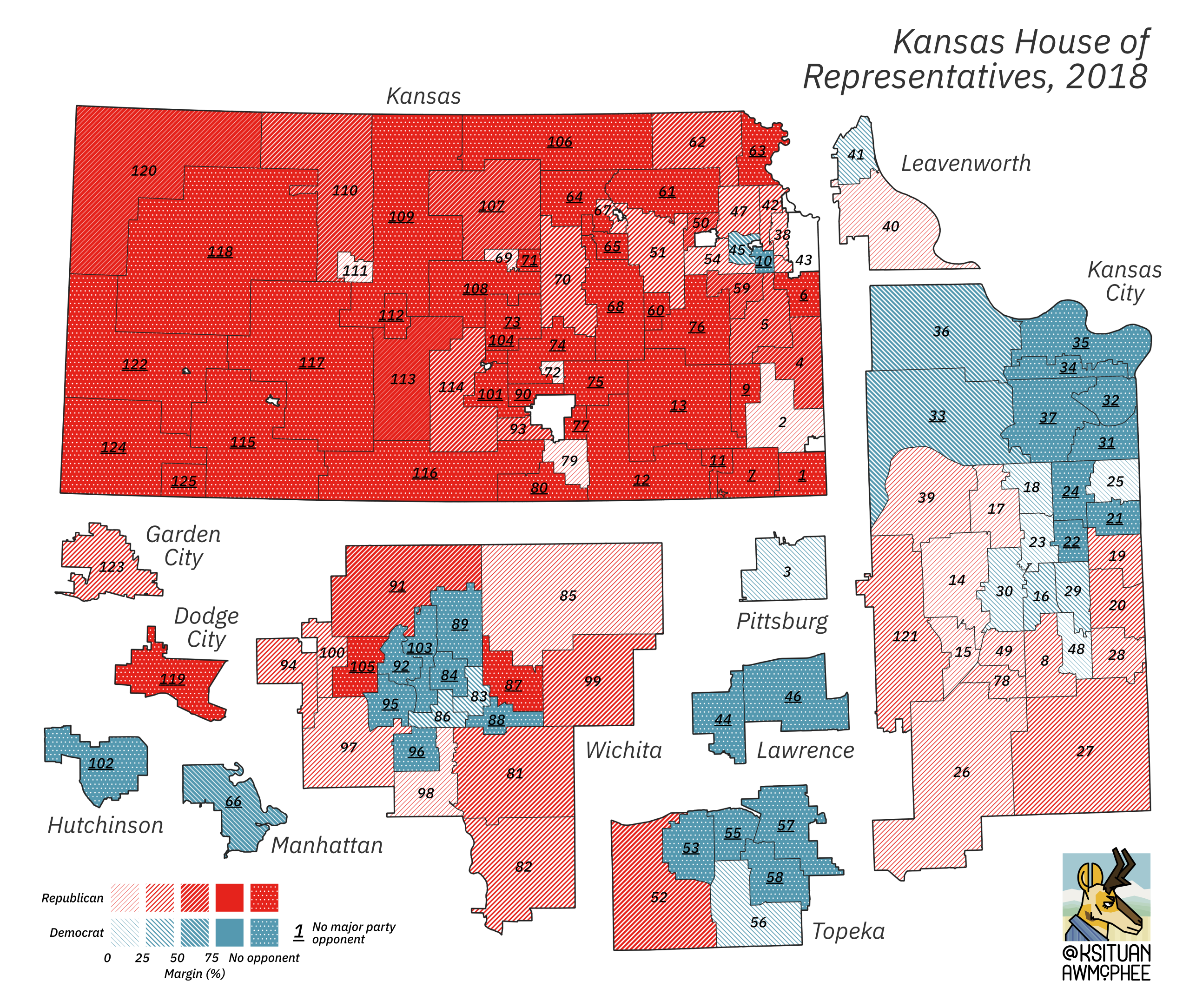
Results of the Kansas House elections

The Kansas House of Representatives held elections for all 125 seats in 2018. Republicans maintained their supermajority in the chamber, with neither parties making any gains.

2018 Kansas House of Representatives elections
Party	Before	After	Change
Republican	85	85	Steady
Democratic	40	40	Steady
Total	125	125	
