= Anthony Brown =

Anthony or Antony Brown may refer to:

== Arts and entertainment ==
- Antony Barrington Brown (1927–2012), English photographer
- Anthony Cave Brown (1929–2006), English-American journalist, espionage non-fiction writer, and historian
- Tony Brown (journalist) (1933–2026), American commentator and radio talk show host
- J. Anthony Brown (born 1945), American comedian, actor and radio personality
- Anthony Brown (jazz musician) (born 1953), American jazz drummer
- T. Graham Brown (born 1954) (Anthony Graham Brown), American country music singer
- Anthony Brown (gospel musician) (born 1981), American singer

== Politics ==
- Tony Brown (Manx politician) (born 1950), Chief Minister of the Isle of Man
- Tony Brown (Kansas politician) (born 1961), member of the Kansas House of Representatives
- Anthony Brown (Maryland politician) (born 1961), Attorney General of Maryland
- Anthony Brown (Kansas politician) (born 1968), member of the Kansas House of Representatives

== Sports ==
=== American football ===
- Tony Brown (offensive lineman) (1964–2010), American footballer
- Tony Brown (defensive back, born 1970), American footballer
- Anthony Brown (offensive lineman) (born 1972), American football offensive lineman
- Tony Brown (defensive tackle) (born 1980), American footballer
- Anthony Brown (cornerback) (born 1993), American football cornerback
- Anthony Brown (quarterback) (born 1998), American football quarterback
- A. B. Brown (born 1965), American football running back

=== Cricket ===
- Anthony Wreford-Brown (1912–1997), English cricketer
- Tony Brown (English cricketer) (1936–2020), English cricketer and administrator
- Anthony Brown (cricketer) (born 1961), Australian cricketer

=== Other sports ===
- Tony Brown (darts player) (1945–2022), English darts player
- Tony Brown (footballer, born 1945), English forward
- Tony Brown (footballer, born 1958), English centre-back
- Tony Brown (basketball) (born 1960), American basketball player and coach
- Anthony Brown (basketball) (born 1992), American basketball player

== Science and medicine ==
- Anthony Brown (scientist) (born 1969), Dutch astronomer

== Fictional characters ==
- Anthony Brown, a fictional character in the 1975–1979 Japanese manga Candy Candy

== See also ==
- Tony Brown (disambiguation)
- Anthony Browne (disambiguation)
- Anthony Cave Brown (1929–2006), British journalist
- Antonio Brown (born 1988), American football wide receiver
- Antonio Brown (wide receiver, born 1978)
