= 2014 Kansas elections =

- November 4, 2014

A general election was held in the U.S. state of Kansas on November 4, 2014. Primary elections were held on August 5.

== Governor and Lieutenant Governor ==
Incumbent Republican Governor Sam Brownback and Lieutenant Governor Jeff Colyer successfully ran for re-election to a second term in office. They defeated Jennifer Winn and her running mate Robin Lais in the Republican primary.

Democrat Paul Davis, Minority Leader of the Kansas House of Representatives, ran unsuccessfully in the general election with running mate businesswoman Jill Docking. Keen Umbehr appeared on the ballot as the Libertarian Party candidate along with running mate Josh Umbehr, a Wichita-based physician.

== Attorney General ==
2014 Kansas Attorney General election
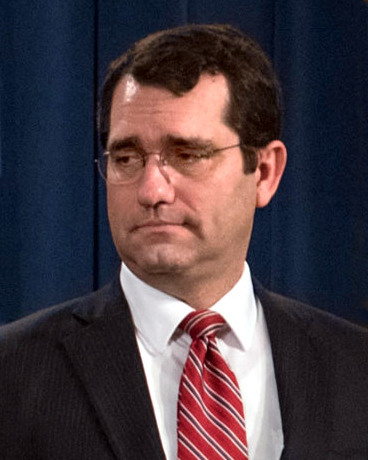

Nominee	Derek Schmidt	A.J. Kotich
Party	Republican	Democratic
Popular vote	564,766	281,105
Percentage	66.7%	33.3%
- County results Schmidt: 50–60% 60–70% 70–80% 80–90% >90% Kotich: 50–60% 60–70%
Attorney General before election
Derek Schmidt
Republican
Elected Attorney General
Derek Schmidt
Republican

Incumbent Republican Attorney General Derek Schmidt ran successfully for re-election to a second term in office. He was opposed by Democrat A.J. Kotich.

=== General election ===
==== Polling ====
Poll source	Date(s) administered	Sample size	Margin of error	Derek Schmidt (R)	A.J. Kotich (D)	Undecided
Public Policy Polling	November 1–3, 2014	963	± 3.2%	59%	32%	9%
Public Policy Polling	October 9–12, 2014	1,081	± 3%	53%	27%	20%
Suffolk University	September 27–30, 2014	500	± 4.4%	45%	25%	30%
Public Policy Polling	September 11–14, 2014	1,328	± 2.7%	50%	27%	24%
Public Policy Polling	August 14–17, 2014	903	± 3.3%	49%	25%	26%

==== Results ====
General election results
Party	Candidate	Votes	%
Republican	Derek Schmidt (incumbent)	564,766	66.7
Democratic	A.J. Kotich	281,105	33.3
Total votes		845,871	100

== Secretary of State ==
2014 Kansas Secretary of State election
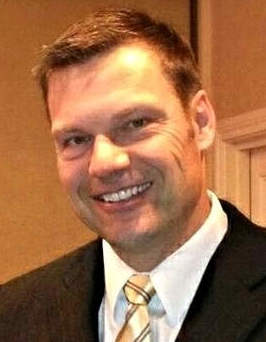

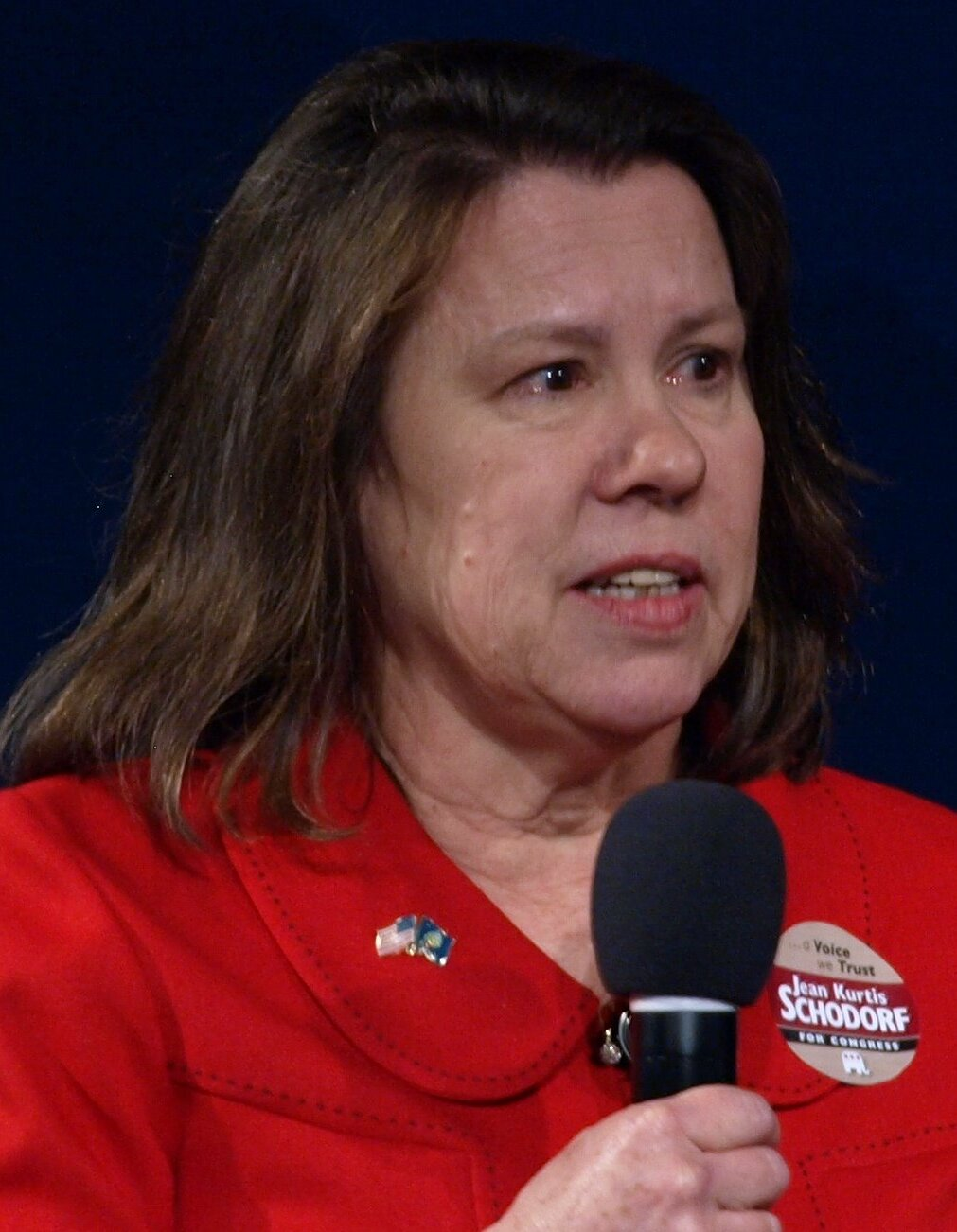
Nominee	Kris Kobach	Jean Schodorf
Party	Republican	Democratic
Popular vote	508,926	350,692
Percentage	59.2%	40.8%
- County results Kobach: 50–60% 60–70% 70–80% 80–90% Schodorf: 50–60% 60–70%
Secretary of State before election
Kris Kobach
Republican
Elected Secretary of State
Kris Kobach
Republican

Incumbent Republican Secretary of State Kris Kobach ran successfully for re-election to a second term in office.

=== Republican primary ===
Kobach was opposed in the primary by Scott Morgan.

==== Endorsements ====
Kris Kobach

Organizations

- Kansas Cattleman's Association

Personalities

- Ted Nugent, rock musician
Scott Morgan

Organizations

- Kansas Livestock Association

Newspapers

- The Kansas City Star
- The Wichita Eagle
- Garden City Telegram
- Ottawa Herald
- The Hutchinson News

==== Polling ====
Poll source	Date(s) administered	Sample size	Margin of error	Kris Kobach	Scott Morgan	Undecided
SurveyUSA	July 17–22, 2014	691	± 3.8%	56%	30%	13%
SurveyUSA	June 19–23, 2014	508	± 4.4%	61%	29%	10%

==== Results ====
Republican primary results
Party	Candidate	Votes	%
Republican	Kris Kobach (incumbent)	166,793	64.7
Republican	Scott Morgan	90,680	35.2
Total votes		257,473	100

=== General election ===
Former Republican state senator Jean Schodorf was the Democratic nominee for the general election. She was defeated by Kobach.

==== Polling ====
Poll source	Date(s) administered	Sample size	Margin of error	Kris Kobach (R)	Jean Schodorf (D)	Undecided
Public Policy Polling	November 1–3, 2014	963	± 3.2%	49%	44%	7%
Survey USA	October 22–26, 2014	623	± 4%	45%	45%	11%
Gravis Marketing	October 20–21, 2014	1,124	± 3%	48%	40%	11%
Public Policy Polling	October 9–12, 2014	1,081	± 3%	47%	41%	12%
SurveyUSA	October 2–5, 2014	549	± 4.3%	48%	43%	9%
Gravis Marketing	September 30–October 1, 2014	850	± 3%	44%	44%	12%
Suffolk University	September 27–30, 2014	500	± 4.4%	45%	40%	15%
Fort Hays State University	September 10–27, 2014	685	± 3.8%	45%	40%	14%
Public Policy Polling	September 11–14, 2014	1,328	± 2.7%	43%	42%	15%
KSN/SurveyUSA	September 4–7, 2014	555	± 4.2%	43%	46%	11%
SurveyUSA	August 20–23, 2014	560	± 4.2%	46%	46%	8%
Public Policy Polling	August 14–17, 2014	903	± 3.3%	43%	38%	19%
SurveyUSA	July 17–22, 2014	1,208	± 2.9%	47%	41%	11%
SurveyUSA	June 19–23, 2014	1,068	± 3.1%	47%	41%	12%

Hypothetical polling

Poll source	Date(s) administered	Sample size	Margin of error	Scott Morgan (R)	Jean Schodorf (D)	Undecided
SurveyUSA	July 17–22, 2014	1,208	± 2.9%	46%	37%	17%
SurveyUSA	June 19–23, 2014	1,068	± 3.1%	44%	39%	17%

==== Results ====
General election results
Party	Candidate	Votes	%
Republican	Kris Kobach (incumbent)	508,926	59.2
Democratic	Jean Schodorf	350,692	40.8
Total votes		859,618	100

== State Treasurer ==
2014 Kansas State Treasurer election
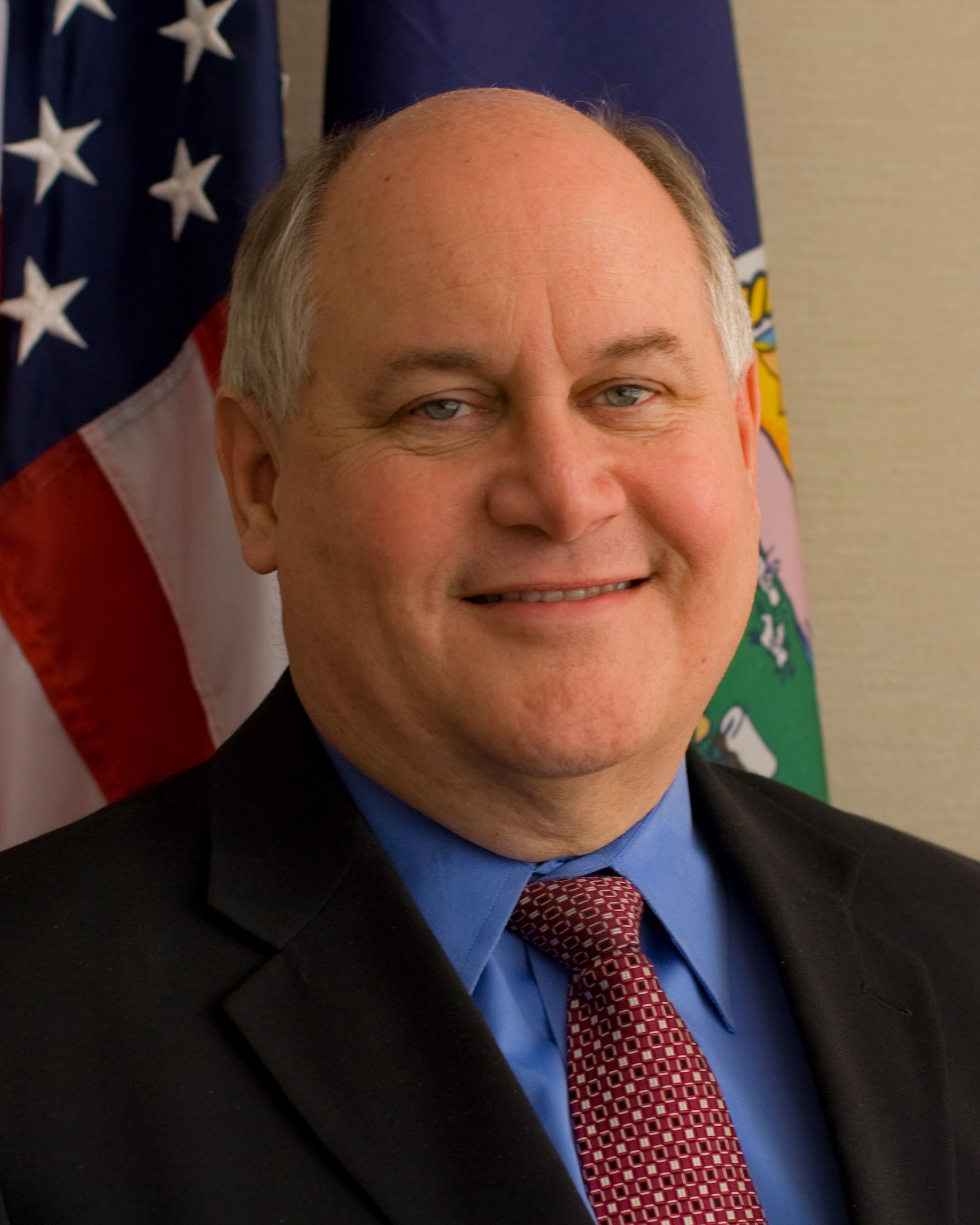

Nominee	Ron Estes	Carmen Alldritt
Party	Republican	Democratic
Popular vote	570,110	274,257
Percentage	67.5%	32.5%
- County results Estes: 50–60% 60–70% 70–80% 80–90% >90% Alldritt : 60–70%
State Treasurer before election
Ron Estes
Republican
Elected State Treasurer
Ron Estes
Republican

Incumbent Republican State Treasurer Ron Estes was re-elected to a second term in office. He defeated Democrat Carmen Alldritt.

=== General election ===
==== Polling ====
Poll source	Date(s) administered	Sample size	Margin of error	Ron Estes (R)	Carmen Alldritt (D)	Undecided
Public Policy Polling	November 1–3, 2014	963	± 3.2%	60%	32%	9%
Public Policy Polling	October 9–12, 2014	1,081	± 3%	50%	30%	20%
Public Policy Polling	September 11–14, 2014	1,328	± 2.7%	47%	28%	24%
Public Policy Polling	August 14–17, 2014	903	± 3.3%	49%	25%	26%

==== Results ====
General election results
Party	Candidate	Votes	%
Republican	Ron Estes (incumbent)	570,110	67.5
Democratic	Carmen Alldritt	274,257	32.5
Total votes		844,367	100

== Commissioner of Insurance ==
2014 Kansas Insurance Commissioner election
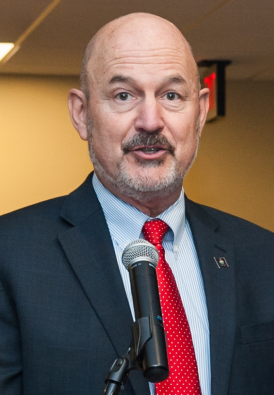

Nominee	Ken Selzer	Dennis Anderson
Party	Republican	Democratic
Popular vote	512,679	320,862
Percentage	61.5%	38.5%
- County results Selzer: 50–60% 60–70% 70–80% 80–90% >90% Anderson: 50–60% 60–70%
Insurance Commissioner before election
Sandy Praeger
Republican
Elected Insurance Commissioner
Ken Selzer
Republican

Incumbent Republican Commissioner of Insurance Sandy Praeger is not running for re-election to a fourth term in office. She has endorsed the Democratic nominee, Dennis Anderson, saying that he is more "dedicated to good public policy and [will] not use the office for political gain." Anderson lost the election to Ken Selzer.

=== Republican primary ===
Beverly Gossage, David J. Powell, Ken Selzer, Clark Shultz and John M. Toplikar ran for the Republican nomination.

==== Results ====
Republican primary results
Party	Candidate	Votes	%
Republican	Ken Selzer	64,911	27.0
Republican	Beverly Gossage	55,306	23.0
Republican	Clark Shultz	54,565	22.7
Republican	David Powell	40,388	16.8
Republican	John Toplikar	24,773	10.3
Total votes		239,943	100

=== General election ===
Selzer defeated Democrat Dennis Anderson in the general election.

==== Polling ====
Poll source	Date(s) administered	Sample size	Margin of error	Ken Selzer (R)	Dennis Anderson (D)	Undecided
Public Policy Polling	November 1–3, 2014	963	± 3.2%	51%	40%	9%
Gravis Marketing	October 20–21, 2014	1,124	± 3%	34%	21%	45%
Public Policy Polling	October 9–12, 2014	1,081	± 3%	48%	32%	20%
Gravis Marketing	September 30–October 1, 2014	850	± 3%	30%	21%	49%
Public Policy Polling	September 11–14, 2014	1,328	± 2.7%	43%	32%	25%
Public Policy Polling	August 14–17, 2014	903	± 3.3%	43%	29%	28%

==== Results ====
General election results
Party	Candidate	Votes	%
Republican	Ken Selzer	512,679	61.5
Democratic	Dennis Anderson	320,862	38.5
Total votes		833,541	100

== United States Senate ==
Republican senator Pat Roberts ran for re-election to a fourth term. Greg Orman is running as an independent. Shawnee County District Attorney Chad Taylor won the Democratic primary, but withdrew his candidacy on September 3. After a court challenge, on September 18, the Kansas Supreme Court ruled that his name would be taken off the ballot. Roberts was re-elected with about 53% of the vote, compared to Orman's 43%.

== United States House of Representatives ==
Four U.S. representatives from the state of Kansas were elected in 2014, one from each of the state's four congressional districts.

== Kansas House of Representatives ==
Elections were held for all 125 seats in the Kansas House of Representatives.
