= Karin Brownlee =

American politician

Kansas Secretary of Labor
- In office January 7, 2011 – September 20, 2012
- Governor: Sam Brownback
- Preceded by: Jim Garner
- Succeeded by: Lana Gordon

Member of the Kansas Senate from the 23rd district
- In office January 13, 1997 – January 10, 2011
- Preceded by: Mark Parkinson
- Succeeded by: Robert S. Olson

Personal details
- Born: July 25, 1955 (age 70) Olathe, Kansas, U.S.
- Party: Republican
- Spouse: Doug Brownlee
- Children: 4
- Education: Kansas State University
- Website: karinbrownlee.com

Karin Brownlee (July 25, 1955) was the Kansas Secretary of Labor between 2011 and 2012, serving in the administration of Governor Sam Brownback. She was later, by her own report, fired by Brownback based on a disagreement about how the agency was running. A member of the Republican Party, she previously served as a member of the Kansas Senate, representing the 23rd district between 1997 and 2011.

== Kansas Senate ==
=== Committee assignments ===
- Commerce (Chair)
- Financial Institutions and Insurance (Vice Chair)
- Joint Committee on Administrative Rules and Regulations
- Assessment and Taxation
- Confirmation Oversight
- Joint Committee on Corrections and Juvenile Justice Oversight
- Transportation
- Utilities

== Kansas Department of Labor ==
In early January 2011 Brownlee took office as Secretary in the Kansas Department of Labor (KDOL). She claimed that the upgrading of the unemployment claims technology project commenced in 2005 was being mismanagement and brought in an outside technology company to review work to date.

In August 2011 Brownlee terminated the employment of asthma sufferer Kathleen Arbogast who filed suit against KDOL in January 2013 claiming discrimination and retaliation and seeking $100.000 in damages. Arbogast had complained about staff wearing perfume and other fragrances interfered with her ability to perform her duties. She was moved to the basement to remove her from such contact but claimed that the fragrances worn by other workers visiting her continued her asthma problems. KDOL sought to have the lawsuit dismissed but the U.S. District Court for the District of Kansas denied the motion, KDOL then appealed to the 10th circuit court which affirmed the decision in the District Court. The case moved to the U.S. District Court for the District of Kansas which brought down its decision 9 September 2016. In the discussion it found that, " ... Plaintiff has pointed the Court to no statutory authority indicating that KDOL has the capacity to be sued. Accordingly, the Court grants Defendant’s motion to dismiss."

In September 2012 Brownlee was removed from KDOL by Gov. Sam Brownback without explanation.

Political offices
Preceded by Jim Garner	Kansas Secretary of Labor; 2011–2012	Succeeded by Lana Gordon
