= Senator Eldredge =

Senator Eldredge may refer to:

- Charles A. Eldredge (1820–1896), Wisconsin State Senate
- Jane Eldredge (born 1944), Kansas State Senate

== See also ==
- Senator Eldridge (disambiguation)
