= Senator Winter =

Senator Winter may refer to:

- Faith Winter (born 1980), Colorado State Senate
- William Aylmer Winter (1872–1952), Mississippi State Senate
- Wint Winter Jr. (born 1953), Kansas State Senate
- Winton A. Winter Sr. (1930–2013), Kansas State Senate

== See also ==
- Senator Winters (disambiguation)
