= Jim Garner (American politician) =

American politician

Kansas Secretary of Labor
- In office January 7, 2003 – January 7, 2011
- Governor: Kathleen Sebelius; Mark Parkinson
- Succeeded by: Karin Brownlee

Member of the Kansas House of Representatives from the 7th district
- In office January 14, 1991 – January 7, 2003
- Preceded by: Gilbert Gregory
- Succeeded by: James F. Miller

Personal details
- Born: June 14, 1963 (age 63) Coffeyville, Kansas, U.S.
- Party: Democratic
- Education: Coffeyville Community College; University of Kansas (B.A., J.D.)

Jim David Garner (born June 14, 1963) is an American politician, who served from 2003 to 2011 as the Kansas Secretary of Labor. Garner was appointed to the post by former Governor Kathleen Sebelius. Garner currently serves as the Administrator of the federal Office of Unemployment Insurance, having been appointed July 4, 2021. Previously, he served nine years as the Deputy Administrator of the Office of Unemployment Insurance.

Garner attended Coffeyville public schools, graduating from Field Kindley High School and Coffeyville Community College. He earned a B.A. in history from the University of Kansas and a J.D. from the University of Kansas School of Law.

Following law school, Garner served a two-year appointment as a research attorney for U.S. District Judge Dale E. Saffels of the U.S. District Court for the District of Kansas.

Garner served six terms in the Kansas House of Representatives, having been first elected to the 11th District in November 1990. He served as the ranking Democrat on the House Judiciary Committee, as Vice Chairman of the House Rules Committee and as a member of the House Taxation Committee, the House Insurance Committee, and the House Business, Commerce and Labor Committee.

In December 1998, Garner was unanimously elected to serve as the House Minority Leader of the Kansas House of Representatives and was re-elected to that position in 2000.

On January 7, 2003, Governor Kathleen Sebelius announced her selection of Garner to serve as Acting Secretary of the Kansas Department of Labor, and on March 28 the Governor selected him to serve as Secretary of Labor.

Party political offices
Preceded by Kathleen Sebelius	Democratic nominee for Kansas Insurance Commissioner; 2002	Succeeded by Bonnie Sharp
Political offices
Preceded by	Kansas Secretary of Labor; 2003–2011	Succeeded by Karin Brownlee
