= Tevis =

Tevis is a surname, and may refer to:

- James Henry Tevis (1837–1905), Arizona pioneer who founded Teviston
- Julia A. Tevis (1799–1880), pioneer educator of women from Kentucky
- Lloyd Tevis (1824–1899), American banker
- Paul Tevis, podcaster
- Peter Tevis (1937–2006), American folk singer
- Sean Tevis (born 1969), American political candidate
- Walter Tevis (1928–1984), American writer
- Washington Carroll Tevis (1829–1900), American soldier of fortune

It may also refer to:

- Tevis Cup, an endurance horse riding competition
- Tevis Gabriel, Brazilian footballer
