= Senator Berman =

Senator Berman may refer to:

- Arnold Berman (1929–1994), Kansas State Senate
- Arthur Berman (1935–2020), Illinois State Senate
- Carol Berman (1923–2023), New York State Senate
- Lori Berman (born 1958), Florida State Senate
