= Lana Gordon (politician) =

American politician (born 1950)

Kansas Secretary of Labor
- In office September 21, 2012 – January 14, 2019
- Governor: Sam Brownback; Jeff Colyer
- Preceded by: Karin Brownlee
- Succeeded by: Delia Garcia

Member of the Kansas House of Representatives from the 52nd district
- In office January 8, 2001 – September 21, 2012
- Preceded by: Lynn Jenkins
- Succeeded by: Shanti Gandhi

Personal details
- Born: August 20, 1950 (age 76) Kansas City, Missouri, U.S.
- Party: Republican
- Spouse: Arnold Gordon
- Children: 3
- Education: University of Kansas (B.S.)
- Occupation: Teacher, Politician

Lana Gordon (born August 20, 1950) is an American politician who served as the Kansas Secretary of Labor under the administrations of Governors Sam Brownback and Jeff Colyer. A member of the Republican Party, Gordon previously served as a member of the Kansas House of Representatives, representing the 52nd district from 2001 to 2012.

== Early life and career ==
Lana Gordon was born on August 20, 1950, to Myron and Hariette Goodman in Kansas City, Missouri. Growing up, Gordon worked for her family's local hardware store in Kansas City before graduating from Shawnee Mission East High School in 1968. She graduated from the University of Kansas with her Bachelor of Science in elementary education in 1971.

From 1971 to 1972, Gordon worked as a substitute teacher before working as a full-time third grade teacher at Lee's Summit Elementary School in Missouri from 1972 to 1973. She then worked as a test administrator for the Kansas Department of Education from 1978 to 1980. Gordon was the secretary of the Topeka Unified School District 501 Citizens Advisory Council from 1982 to 1985, where she later served as a board member of the Topeka Unified School District from 1994 to 1997. From 1997 to 2001, she worked as the Secretary-Treasurer of the Cardinal Building Service Solutions before being elected to the Kansas House of Representatives. She worked as an Account Representative for BG Service Solutions/ISS from 2005 to 2012. Gordon was also a small business owner, previously owning four gift shops in the Topeka area.

She is a member of the Topeka Chamber of Commerce and United Way. Gordon and her husband, Arnold, have three children and five grandchildren.

== Kansas House of Representatives ==
=== Tenure ===
Gordon was first elected to the Kansas House of Representatives in 2000 and was sworn in on January 8, 2001. She was elected to a total of six two-year terms, winning with more than 60% of the vote in every election. The Kansas Policy Institute gave her a 75% evaluation on its Freedom Index and the Kansas Chapter of Americans for Prosperity gave her an evaluation of 90 on conservative issues.

=== Committee assignments ===
- Education
- Health and Human Services
- Economic Development and Tourism (Chair)
- Local Government
- Joint Committee on Arts and Cultural Resources
- Joint Committee on Economic Development (Chair)

== Kansas Secretary of Labor ==
On September 21, 2012, Governor Sam Brownback nominated Gordon to serve as Kansas Secretary of Labor.

Political offices
Preceded by Karin Brownlee	Kansas Secretary of Labor; 2012–2019	Succeeded by Delia Garcia
