= Terri Gregory =

American politician (born 1958)

Member of the Kansas House of Representatives from the 10th district
- In office 2011 – January 14, 2013
- Preceded by: Tony Brown
- Succeeded by: John Wilson

Personal details
- Born: June 19, 1958 (age 68) Greensburg, Kansas
- Party: Republican
- Education: University of Missouri–Kansas City

Terri Lois Gregory (born 1958) is a former politician from the U.S. state of Kansas. Gregory served for one term as a Republican member of the Kansas House of Representatives representing the 10th district from 2011 to 2013.

Gregory was born in the rural town of Greensburg, Kansas. She attended college at the University of Missouri-Kansas City. In 2004, she became campaign manager for Mike Kiegerl, who was running for the Kansas House in the 43rd district; after his victory, he hired her as a legislative aide, where she worked for six years.

In 2010, she ran for office herself in the 10th district; she easily triumphed in the Republican primary election, winning with 69% of the vote, and narrowly defeated incumbent Democrat Tony Brown in the general election, winning 53% to his 47% of the vote. In 2012, Gregory faced redistricting and chose to run in the 59th House district, where she lost the primary to Blaine Finch; she was replaced in the 10th district by Democrat John Wilson after he defeated Republican Erica Anderson.
