= Delia Garcia =

American politician

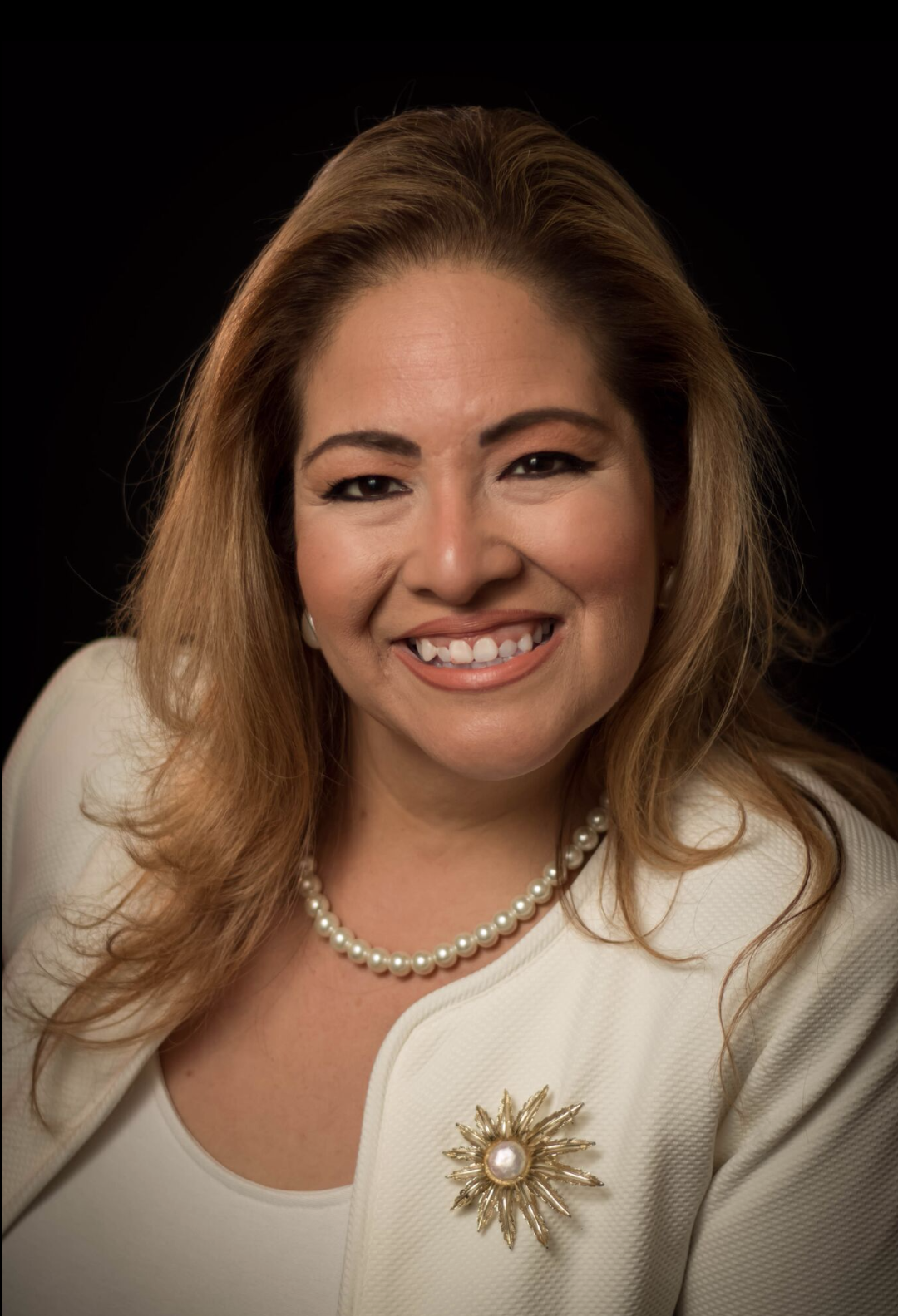

Kansas Secretary of Labor
- In office January 14, 2019 – June 22, 2020
- Governor: Laura Kelly
- Preceded by: Lana Gordon
- Succeeded by: Ryan Wright (acting)

Member of the Kansas House of Representatives from the 103rd district
- In office January 10, 2005 – January 10, 2011
- Preceded by: Thomas Klein
- Succeeded by: Ponka-We Victors

Personal details
- Born: May 13, 1977 (age 49) Wichita, Kansas, U.S.
- Party: Democratic
- Education: Wichita State University (BA); St. Mary's University (MA)
- Website: www.deliagarcia.us

Delia Garcia (born May 13, 1977) is an American executive and former government official who is the CEO of Garcia Strategies LLC. She worked at the U.S. Department of Labor 2021 to 2025 and as the Kansas Secretary of Labor from 2019 to 2020. Garcia previously was a Democratic member of the Kansas House of Representatives, representing the 103rd district from 2005 to 2011, where she was the founder and president of the Kansas State Legislative Hispanic Caucus.

== Early life and education ==
Garcia, who has a bachelor's degree from Wichita State University and a master's in political science from St. Mary's University, Texas, worked as a professor at Butler Community College, as well as an assistant manager at Connie's Mexico Cafe.

== Career ==
García is an executive coach, leadership mentor, and author. She is the founder and CEO of Garcia Strategies LLC, a strategic advisory and leadership development firm, and works as an executive coach with the Bryant Group. In 2022, Delia García authored the book Latina Leadership Lessons: Fifty Latinas Speak, published by Arte Público Press, which compiles leadership insights and lessons from fifty high-achieving Latina leaders across the United States. She also is on the national board of the Southwest Voter Registration Education Project and as an advisor and co-founder of the National Latina State Legislative Caucus.

García was a Regional Administrator for the U.S. Department of Labor Women's Bureau from 2023 to 2025. In this role, she directed the bureau's initiatives and regional operations across the South-Central United States, focusing on equitable workforce expansion and policies impacting women in the labor force. Prior to this, from 2021 to 2023, she was Co-Lead Equity Expert for the Department's Employment and Training Administration with the Central Response Division (ETA CRD), helping lead national strategies focused on equity and workforce development.

In January 2019, García returned to state administration when Governor Laura Kelly appointed her as the Kansas Cabinet Secretary of Labor. Following confirmation by the Kansas Senate, she became the first Latina to hold a cabinet secretary position in the state's history. During her tenure, she managed the agency through the onset of the COVID-19 pandemic and established the Kansas Anti-Labor Trafficking Initiative in partnership with the federal government.

Prior to her cabinet appointment, García spent nearly a decade in Washington, D.C., leading national non-profit organizations. She was the CEO of two prominent national non-profits: ReflectUS, a non-partisan coalition focused on increasing women's representation in elected and appointed office, and the National Migrant Seasonal Head Start Association (NMSHSA), which advocates for farmworker families and early childhood education. She also was a Senior Liaison to minority communities for the National Education Association.

García began her career in elective politics in her home state. In 2004, she was elected to the Kansas House of Representatives, representing the 103rd district. Serving from 2005 to 2011, she made history as both the first Latina and the youngest woman elected to the Kansas Legislature, where she also served as the founder and president of the Kansas State Legislative Hispanic Caucus. In 2010, rather than run for re-election herself, she helped former Intern Ponka-We Victors file as the sole candidate in the Democratic primary election. Victors held the seat until 2022, when another community protégé of Delia Garcia, Angela Martinez, was elected and began serving in 2023.

== Committee membership ==
- Commerce and Labor
- Veterans, Military and Homeland Security
- Local Government (Ranking Member)
- Elections

== Major donors ==
The top 5 donors to Garcia's 2008 campaign:

1. Kansans for Lifesaving Cures: $750
2. Garcia, Delia: $725
3. Ruffin, Phil: $600
4. The Kansas Realtor PAC: $500
5. Comejo, Ronald J: $500
