= John Wilson (Kansas politician) =

American politician

Member of the Kansas House of Representatives from the 10th district
- In office January 14, 2013 – July 28, 2017
- Preceded by: Terri Gregory (redistricted)
- Succeeded by: Eileen Horn

Personal details
- Born: October 24, 1983 (age 42)
- Party: Democratic

John Wilson (born October 24, 1983) is a former Democratic member of the Kansas House of Representatives representing the 10th district, which encompasses parts of Lawrence and all of southeastern Douglas County. In 2008 he ran unsuccessfully in the 45th district, losing to Republican Tom Sloan.

First elected in 2012, Wilson resigned his seat in 2017 to focus on his work and family, and later became a president and CEO of Kansas Action for Children.

Preceded by Valdenia Winn	Democratic Policy Chairman of the Kansas House of Representatives; January 12, 2015 – present	Succeeded by Incumbent
