= Christina Haswood =

American politician (born 1994)

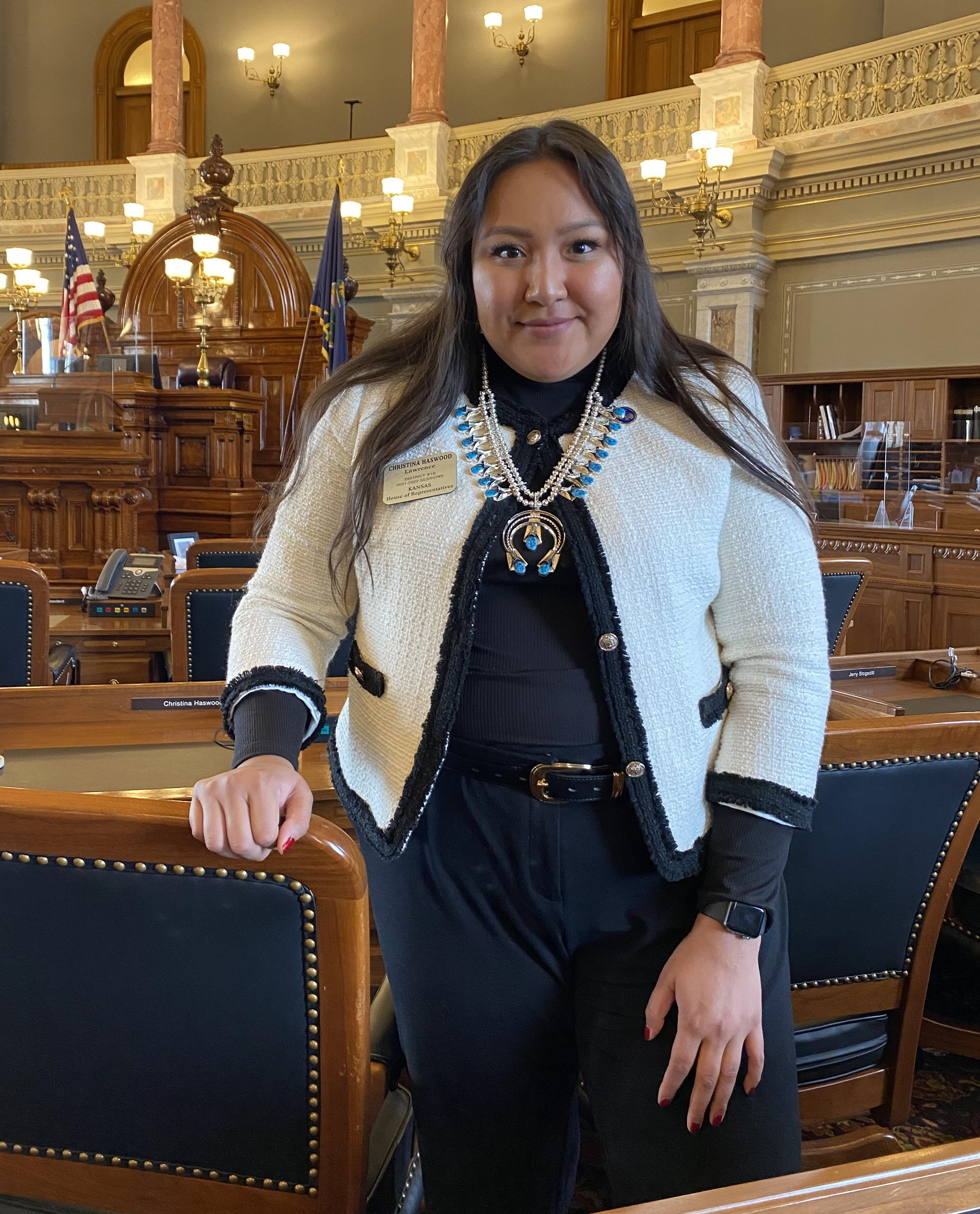

Member of the Kansas House of Representatives from the 10th district
- In office January 11, 2021 – January 13, 2025
- Preceded by: Eileen Horn
- Succeeded by: Suzanne Wikle

Personal details
- Born: April 17, 1994 (age 32) Lawrence, Kansas, U.S.
- Party: Democratic
- Education: Haskell Indian Nations University (AS); Arizona State University (BS); University of Kansas (MPH)

Christina Haswood (born April 17, 1994) is an American politician who served as a Democratic member of the Kansas House of Representatives from the 10th district. Haswood represented southeastern Douglas County, including Baldwin City and part of Lawrence from 2021 to 2025.

Haswood was among the youngest members of the Kansas Legislature, as well as the third Native American member in the body's history.

== Early life and education ==
Haswood is Navajo. She was named Miss Indian Youth of Lawrence as a teenager.

Haswood earned an associate's degree in Community Health at Haskell Indian Nations University before transferring to Arizona State University and earning a Bachelor's degree in public health in 2018. She graduated from the University of Kansas Medical Center with a Master's in Public Health in May 2020.

== Career ==
Haswood announced her campaign for the Kansas House of Representatives from District 10 in May 2020. Her campaign quickly garnered support from prominent local, state, and national officials, including the retiring 10th District incumbent Eileen Horn, former Governor of Kansas Kathleen Sebelius, and New Mexico Congresswoman Deb Haaland.

During the primary, Haswood began posting videos to a campaign TikTok account about her life and activities, which gradually increased in attention. Due in part to small donations from across the country as a result, Haswood raised the most money of any candidate in the race.

On August 4, 2020, Haswood won the primary with 71% of the vote. No Republican candidate filed to contest the general election. Haswood was elected to the Kansas House unopposed on November 3, 2020.

In 2024, she challenged Democratic state senator Marci Francisco, but lost the primary.

=== Kansas House of Representatives ===
Haswood wore traditional Navajo attire during her swearing-in ceremony on January 11, 2021. Her TikTok videos of the ceremony received media coverage from BuzzFeed and Vogue. She serves on the Kansas Department of Health and Environment's Advisory Committee on Trauma.

==== 2021–2022 committee membership ====
- Agriculture
- Health and Human Services
- Water
- Joint Committee on State-Tribal Relations

== Elections ==
Kansas House of Representatives 10th district election, 2020
Primary election
Party	Candidate	Votes	%
Democratic	Christina Haswood	2,621	70.7
Democratic	Brandon Holland	550	14.8
Democratic	AJ Stevens	535	14.4
Total votes		3,706	100.0
General election
Democratic	Christina Haswood	9,446	100.0
Total votes		9,446	100.0
Democratic hold			

== See also ==
- List of Native American politicians
- Native American women in politics
