= Arnold Berman =

American politician

Member of the Kansas Senate from the 2nd district
- In office 1977–1980
- Preceded by: Arden Booth
- Succeeded by: Jane Eldredge

Personal details
- Born: May 14, 1929
- Died: January 19, 1994
- Party: Democratic
- Spouse: Sandra Rae Wax

Arnold Berman (May 14, 1929–January 19, 1994) was an American politician who served one term in the Kansas State Senate from 1977 to 1980.

He defeated the incumbent, Arden Booth, in 1976.
