= Wynton =

Wynton or Winton is a masculine given name. Notable people with the name include:

- Wynton Bernard (born 1990), American baseball player
- Wynton Hall, American non-fiction writer and journalist
- Winton C. Hoch (1905–1979), American cinematographer
- Wynton Kelly (1931–1971), American jazz pianist
- Wynton Marsalis (born 1961), American trumpeter, composer, bandleader and music educator
- Winton Pickering (born 1962), Cook Islands politician
- Wynton Rufer, CNZM, (born 1962), New Zealand retired footballer
- Winton Turnbull (1899–1980), Australian politician
- Winton A. Winter Sr. (1930–2013), American politician
