= Allison Hougland =

American politician

Member of the Kansas House of Representatives from the 15th district
- In office January 9, 2023 – January 13, 2025
- Preceded by: John Toplikar
- Succeeded by: Lauren Bohi

Personal details
- Born: Olathe, Kansas, U.S.
- Party: Democratic

Allison Hougland is an American politician and realtor who served as a Democratic member of the Kansas House of Representatives from the 15th district. She was elected in 2022 and lost her race in 2024, serving from January 9, 2023 to January 13, 2025.

== Early life ==
Hougland was born in Olathe, Kansas, grew up there, and works there. She lives in the city. Her father was a state representative and judge, and her mother was a small business owner.

== Career ==
Hougland has been employed as a realtor for the last six years. In 2022, she ran for the Kansas House. She won by 78 votes running against Republican nominee Matt Bingesser. In the state legislature, she served on the committees for homelessness, welfare reform, elections in addition to child welfare and foster care.

Kansas House of Representatives 15, 2022
Party	Candidate	Votes	%
Democratic	Allison Hougland	2,915	50.68%
Republican	Matt Bingesser	2,837	49.32%
Total votes		5,752	100

Kansas House of Representatives 15, 2024
Party	Candidate	Votes	%
Republican	Lauren Bohi	3,935	50.68%
Democratic	Allison Hougland *	3,829	49.32%
Total votes		7,764	100
