= Anthony Browne =

Anthony or Tony Browne may refer to:

- Anthony Browne (died 1506) (1443–1506), Standard Bearer of England, Governor of Queenborough Castle and Constable of Calais
- Anthony Browne (died 1548) (c. 1500–1548), English courtier, son of Sir Anthony, Standard Bearer
- Anthony Browne (judge) (1509–1567), judge and MP who founded Brentwood School, England
- Anthony Browne, 1st Viscount Montagu (1528–1592), son of Sir Anthony (died 1548)
- Anthony Browne (1552–1592), English sheriff, son of 1st Viscount Montagu
- Anthony-Maria Browne, 2nd Viscount Montagu (1554–1629), son of Anthony (1552–1592)
- Anthony Browne, 7th Viscount Montagu (1728–1787), English peer and landowner
- Anthony Montague Browne (1923–2013), aide to Winston Churchill in the last ten years of Churchill's life
- Anthony Browne (author) (born 1946), British writer and illustrator of children's books
- Anthony Browne (politician) (born 1967), British journalist, author, and member of parliament for South Cambridgeshire
- Tony Browne (hurler) (born 1973), Irish hurler
- Tony Browne (rugby union) (1929/30–2010), Irish rugby player
- Tony Browne (diplomat) (born 1948), New Zealand diplomat

== See also ==
- Anthony Brown (disambiguation)
- Tony Brown (disambiguation)
