= Wint Winter Jr. =

American politician

Member of the Kansas Senate from the 2nd district
- In office 1983–1992
- Preceded by: Jane Eldredge
- Succeeded by: Sandy Praeger

Personal details
- Born: April 19, 1953 (age 73)
- Party: Republican
- Parent: Winton A. Winter Sr. (father)
- Education: University of Kansas (B.A. and J.D.)

Winton Allen Winter Jr. (born April 19, 1953) is an American politician who served as the Kansas State Senator from the 2nd district from 1983 to 1992.

His father, Winton A. Winter Sr., was also a Kansas State Senator. Wint Jr. himself is a fifth-generation Kansas resident, and attended the University of Kansas. In addition to his time in the State Senate, Wint Jr. has worked as the CEO of a bank. In June 2021, Governor Laura Kelly appointed him to the Kansas Board of Regents, for a term scheduled to end in 2025.
