= Sean Tevis =

American politician

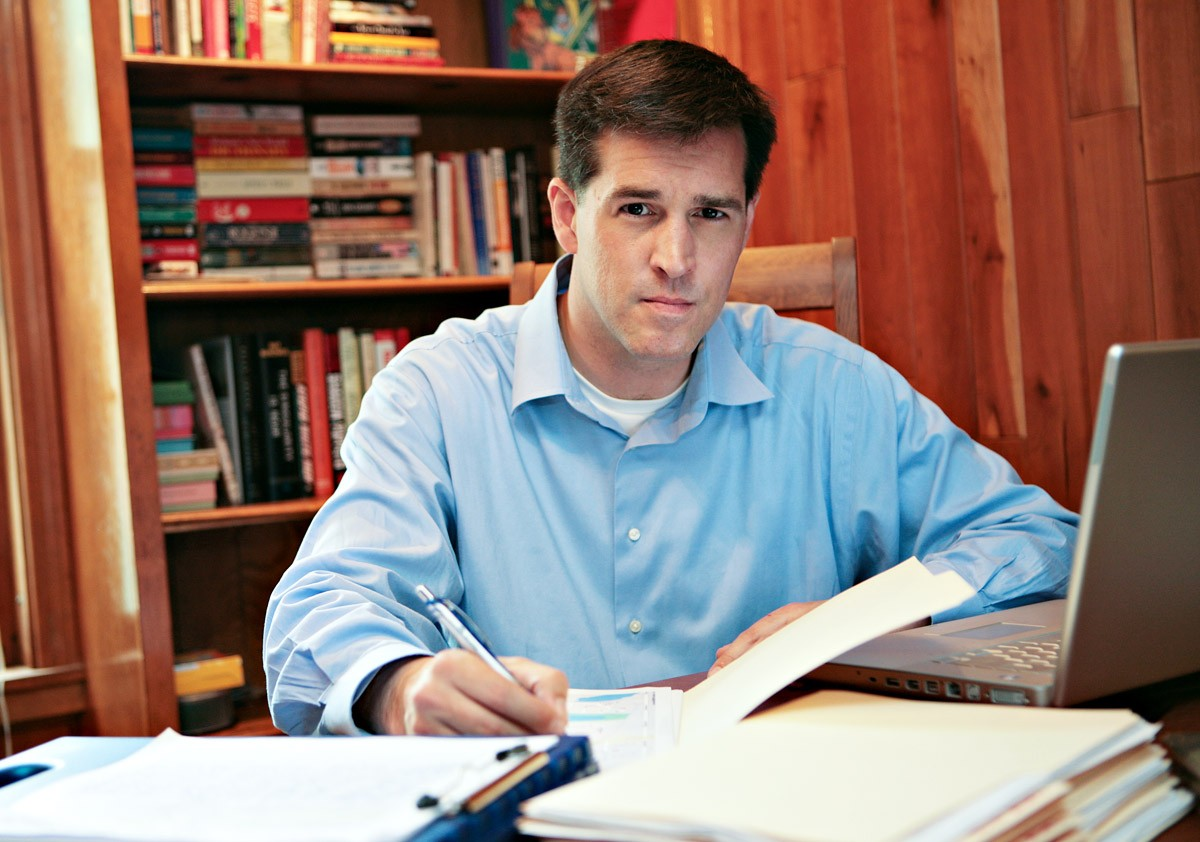
- Born: July 22, 1969 (age 57); Lawrence, Kansas, US
- Occupation: Web designer

Sean Tevis (born July 22, 1969, in Lawrence, Kansas, US) is a former candidate for the Kansas House of Representatives and Kansas's 2nd congressional district. His 2008 campaign for a seat in the Kansas House as a Democrat included an off-beat ad campaign that attracted national attention and thousands of small donors; he lost to incumbent Arlen Siegfreid by a mere 425 votes, out of 10,103 cast. His 2010 campaign for Congress was less successful; Tevis came in third place in the Democratic primary, with 20% of the vote.

== Early life ==
Tevis attended Shawnee Mission West High School, where he was elected Class President for two years before losing the election for Student Body President his senior year to friend and future actor Paul Rudd. Tevis majored in Journalism at the University of Kansas. Subsequently, he worked as a journalist for The Palm Beach Post and The Miami Herald. He helped start an internet business in 1999 and worked for three years for the municipal government of the city of Coconut Creek, Florida. He worked as an interaction designer for Cerner Corporation, a healthcare IT company headquartered in Kansas City. As of 2013, he works as a design lead for Epiq, a legal services company in Kansas City.

== Political career ==
=== 2008 campaign for Kansas House of Representatives ===
In 2008, Tevis was the Democratic candidate in the 15th district of the Kansas House of Representatives, challenging incumbent Arlen H. Siegfreid. Tevis drew national headlines for an unorthodox advertising campaign based on the web-comic xkcd, which resulted in donations totaling more than $100,000 from more than 5,000 online donors. At the time, this was significantly more than any other candidate for the Kansas House of Representatives had ever raised, with the next highest total being that of fellow Democrat Raj Goyle with $96,104.

Tevis's platform included abolishing the sales tax on food, raising teacher pay, and protecting an individual's right to privacy. In the heavily Republican district, Tevis lost the race by 425 votes out of 10,103 cast.

Possibly in reaction to Tevis's fund-raising tactic, Kansas State Representative Scott Schwab introduced a bill that was nicknamed the "Sean Tevis bill" which would have required candidates to report the names and addresses of contributors who give less than $50 to a political campaign.

=== 2010 Congressional race ===
In 2010, Tevis ran for Congress. Tevis announced that he had an idea that could "reduce the effects of special interests...and end unhealthy partisanship." In the Democratic primary on August 3, 2010, Tevis came in third with 20% of the vote, thus ending his campaign.
