= Senator Winters =

Senator Winters may refer to:

- Jackie Winters (1937–2019), Oregon State Senate
- John W. Winters (1920–2004), North Carolina State Senate
- Kenneth W. Winters (born 1934), Kentucky State Senate

== See also ==
- Senator Winter (disambiguation)
