= Robert Montgomery (politician) =

American politician

Member of the Kansas House of Representatives from the 15th district
- In office January 14, 2013 – December 31, 2013
- Preceded by: Arlen Siegfreid
- Succeeded by: Erin Davis

Member of the Kansas House of Representatives from the 26th district
- In office January 11, 2011 – January 14, 2013
- Preceded by: Robert Olson
- Succeeded by: Larry Campbell

Personal details
- Born: May 27, 1949 (age 77) Kansas City, Missouri, U.S.
- Party: Republican
- Spouse: Melinda
- Children: 2

Robert Montgomery (born May 27, 1949) is an American small business owner and politician from Olathe, Kansas, formerly a Republican member of the Kansas House of Representatives representing the 15th House District, which covers southwest Olathe.

== Legislative service and politics ==
Montgomery was elected in 1997 to the first of his four-term at-large stint as a member of Olathe's City Council. His first term in the House began in January 2011 when he was elected by a caucus of Republican precinct leaders to replace fellow Republican Rob Olson in the 26th House District who was moving to the Kansas Senate. He was appointed to the standing committees on insurance; veterans, military and homeland security; financial institutions; elections; and transportation.

In 2012, Montgomery resigned from 26th district after the Federal Courts released new state house districts maps, in order to run for the new 15th district. He ran unopposed in the general election and defeated Elliot Lahn in the Republican primary.

Montgomery resigned from office effective December 31, 2013 citing family reasons.
