= Sandy Praeger =

American politician

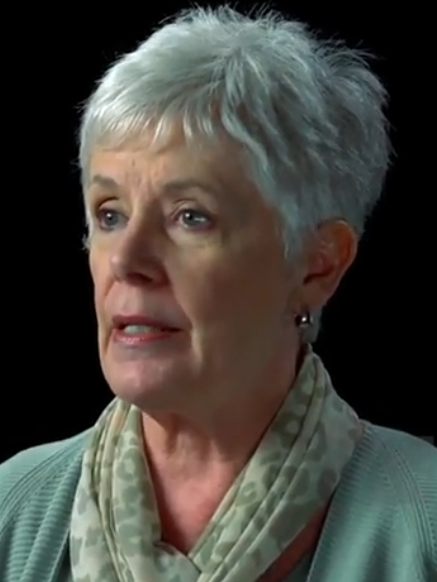

24th Kansas Insurance Commissioner
- In office January 13, 2003 – January 12, 2015
- Governor: Kathleen Sebelius; Mark Parkinson; Sam Brownback
- Preceded by: Kathleen Sebelius
- Succeeded by: Ken Selzer

Member of the Kansas Senate from the 2nd district
- In office January 11, 1993 – January 13, 2003
- Preceded by: Wint Winter Jr.
- Succeeded by: Mark Buhler

Member of the Kansas House of Representatives from the 44th district
- In office January 14, 1991 – January 11, 1993
- Preceded by: Jessie M. Branson
- Succeeded by: Barbara Ballard

Personal details
- Born: October 21, 1944 (age 81) Fayetteville, North Carolina, U.S.
- Party: Republican
- Spouse: Mark Praeger
- Education: University of Kansas

Sandy Praeger (born October 21, 1944) is a former American politician from the U.S. state of Kansas who served as the Kansas Insurance Commissioner from 2003 to 2015. Prior to her term as insurance commissioner, she was a member of the Kansas Senate and Kansas House of Representatives, and served as mayor of Lawrence, Kansas. Although she won her elections as a Republican, she disagreed with the more conservative faction in her party, eventually leading her to endorse a Democrat to succeed her as insurance commissioner.

== Political career ==
=== Early career ===
Praeger was a member of the city commission in her hometown of Lawrence, Kansas from 1985 to 1989, including a stint as mayor from 1986 to 1987. She served one term in the Kansas House of Representatives, elected in 1990; in 1992, she won the first of her three terms in the Kansas State Senate, representing the 2nd District. Praeger served in the State Senate from 1993 to 2002, when she was elected as insurance commissioner; Mark Buhler was elected to finish out the remaining two years of her term as State Senator.

=== Insurance Commissioner ===
Praeger was elected Insurance Commissioner on November 2, 2002, and her term began January 13, 2003. She was re-elected in 2006 and 2010 to the same position. As commissioner, she was responsible for regulating all insurance sold in Kansas and overseeing the nearly 1,700 insurance companies and 110,000 agents licensed to do business in the state.

Praeger is also the former president of the National Association of Insurance Commissioners, and has been their spokesperson in favor of maintaining state insurance regulation rather than an optional federal charter.

During her term in office, she supported the Patient Protection and Affordable Care Act and opposed conservative Republican Governor Sam Brownback's plan to join a nine-state healthcare compact.

Praeger chose not to seek re-election in 2014. Instead, she chose to endorse the Democratic candidate, Dennis Anderson, to succeed her as Insurance Commissioner.

Praeger is a graduate of the University of Kansas.

== See also ==
- List of mayors of Lawrence, Kansas

Party political offices
| Preceded by Bryan Riley | Republican nominee for Kansas Insurance Commissioner; 2002, 2006, 2010 | Succeeded by Ken Selzer |
