= Ponka-We Victors =

American politician

Member of the Kansas House of Representatives from the 103rd district
- In office January 10, 2011 – January 9, 2023
- Preceded by: Delia Garcia
- Succeeded by: Angela Martinez

Personal details
- Born: July 7, 1981 (age 45) Wichita, Kansas, U.S.
- Party: Democratic
- Education: Wichita State University; Newman University
- Profession: Community Support Worker
- Website: http://www.votevictors.com/

Ponka-We Victors (born July 7, 1981, in Ponca and Tohono Oʼodham) is a community support worker from Wichita, Kansas, who was a Democratic member of the Kansas House of Representatives, representing District 103 from 2011 to 2023.

== Background ==
Victors is an enrolled member of both the Ponca Tribe of Indians of Oklahoma and the Tohono Oʼodham Nation, and a lifelong resident of Wichita. She earned a bachelor's degree in biology from Newman University in 2005, and a Master of Public Administration from Wichita State University in 2008.

== Elected office ==
Victors, who had worked as a Congressional intern, had been a long-time backer of Delia Garcia, the incumbent Representative from Kansas's 103rd congressional district. In 2010, Garcia supported Victors in filing as the only candidate for the 2010 Democratic primary election hours before the filing deadline. Victors became the presumptive winner of the seat. No Republican candidate has run for the seat since 1998, when incumbent Democrat Thomas Klein polled 57% of the vote in a three-way race. Victors ran unopposed in the November general election.

In 2012, she beat challenger Angela Martinez in the Democratic primary and was again unopposed in the November general election.

=== "Illegal immigrants" speech ===
In 2013, Victors drew national attention when, during a hearing on a bill to deny in-state tuition to Kansas high school graduates who were undocumented immigrants, she addressed Kansas Secretary of State Kris Kobach and other advocates of the bill, saying, "I think it's funny, Mr. Kobach, because when you mention illegal immigrant, I think of all of you."

== Career ==
Victors is a social worker at Behavioral Link.

== See also ==
- List of Native American politicians
- Native American women in politics
