= Eileen Horn =

American politician (born 1980)

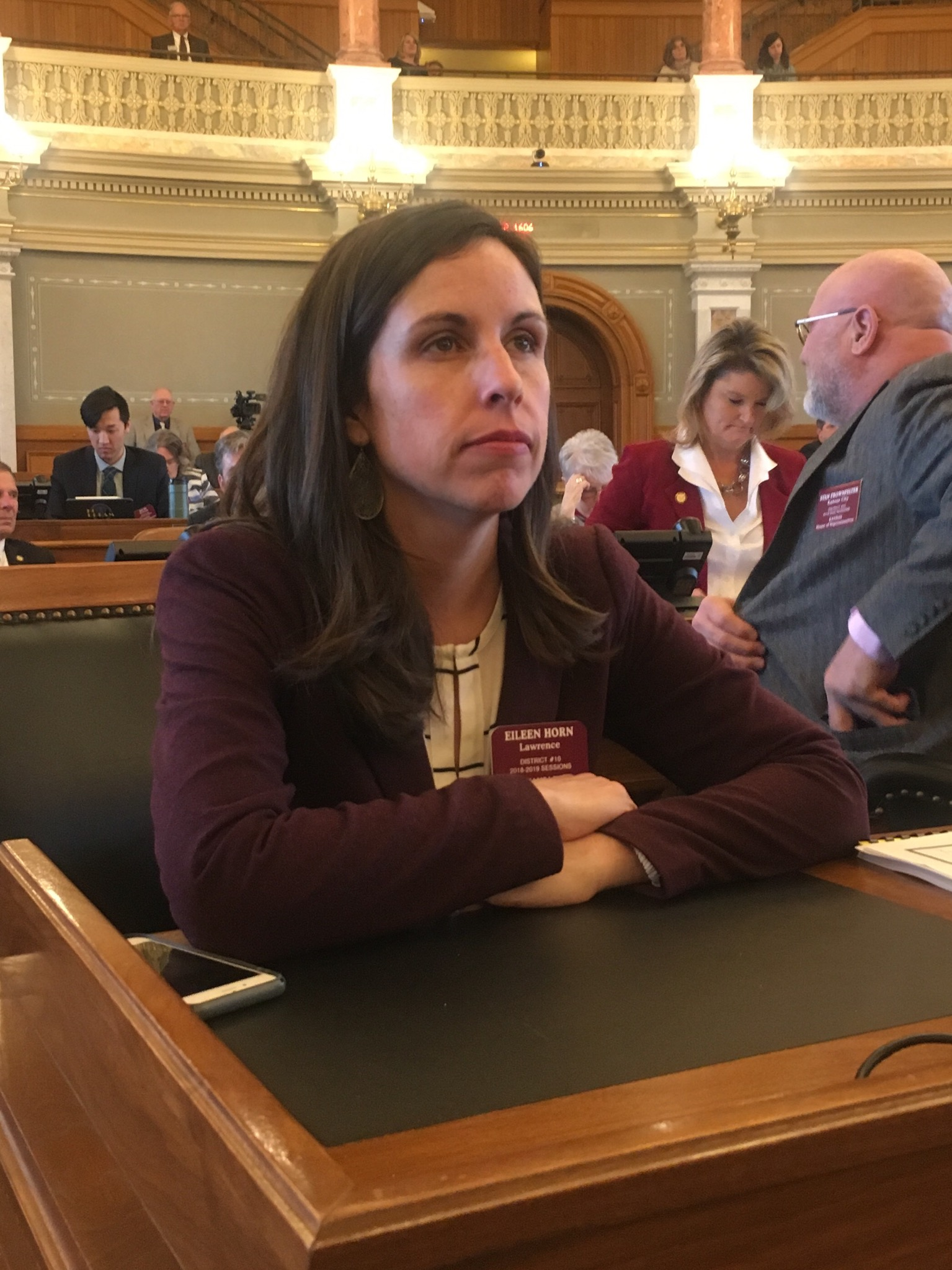

Member of the Kansas House of Representatives from the 10th district
- In office August 30, 2017 – January 11, 2021
- Preceded by: John Wilson
- Succeeded by: Christina Haswood

Personal details
- Born: June 1, 1980 (age 46) Lenexa, Kansas, U.S.
- Party: Democratic
- Education: Catholic University of America (BS); University of Vermont (MS)

Eileen Horn (born June 1, 1980) is an American politician and a former Democratic member of the Kansas House of Representatives. Horn represented the 10th district, consisting of Lawrence, Baldwin City, and southeastern Douglas County, from 2017 to 2021. She also served as Policy Chair of the House Democratic caucus since 2019.

When the Kansas Legislature is not in session, she works with local communities to support sustainability and health initiatives. She also co-owns a restaurant in downtown Lawrence with her husband, who is a chef.

== Professional career ==
Horn was born and raised in Lenexa, Kansas. After graduating summa cum laude from the Catholic University of America in 2002 and receiving her Master's at the University of Vermont in 2007, Horn moved back to Kansas to serve as the Director of Education and Outreach for the Climate and Energy Project based in Lawrence, Kansas. While working at CEP, she was given the Governor's Award for Energy Achievement for her work increasing awareness of energy efficiency solutions.

In 2010, Horn accepted a position as Sustainability Director for the City of Lawrence and Douglas County, coordinating policy initiatives to promote sustainability, energy efficiency, and local food goals. Horn resigned upon her swearing-in to the Kansas Legislature, stating "I really wanted to give my full to this. It’s a big job and I want to be all-in."

She continues to co-own Limestone Pizza, a restaurant in downtown Lawrence, with her husband.

== Legislative career ==
In summer 2017, 10th district Representative John Wilson resigned from the Kansas Legislature citing a desire to focus on his work and family. In August, Horn was selected to serve out the remainder of his term at a meeting of the district's Democratic precinct committeepeople, and was sworn in later that month. She was elected to the legislature in her own right in November 2018, and was later selected by her peers in the House Democratic caucus for the position of Policy Chair for the 2019 and 2020 sessions.

Horn successfully led a charge to establish a dedicated lactation room in the Kansas Capitol, citing difficulties she experienced as a new mother trying to find proper privacy for breastfeeding during her first session as a state representative. Governor Laura Kelly unveiled the newly established room in a ceremony with Horn in January 2019.

=== Policy priorities ===
Horn has cited environmental sustainability, social justice, increasing funding for public education, and raising the minimum wage as major policy priorities. She has called health care a "human right" and supported legislative efforts to expand Medicaid in the state of Kansas under provisions of the Affordable Care Act.

=== 2019–2020 committee membership ===
- Rural Revitalization
- Health and Human Services
- Agriculture
- Calendar and Printing
- Joint Committee on State Building Construction

== Elections ==
Kansas House of Representatives 10th district election, 2018
Primary election
Party	Candidate	Votes	%
Democratic	Eileen Horn	1,958	100.0
Total votes		1,958	100.0
General election
Democratic	Eileen Horn	7,695	100.0
Total votes		7,695	100.0
Democratic hold			

In the 2018 elections, Horn ran unopposed in both the primary and general. Douglas County, the southeast portion of which is covered by the 10th district, is home to Lawrence and the University of Kansas, and is widely known as one of the few Democratic strongholds in largely Republican Kansas.

== Personal life ==
Horn lives in Lawrence, Kansas, with her husband Rick and two children. In 2014, she served as a Healthy Food Access Fellow with the Kansas Health Institute and graduated from Leadership Lawrence, a professional development program in Douglas County. She has also led and helped found multiple community organizations, including the Lawrence Community Mercantile Cooperative, Kansas Women's Environmental Network, the Douglas County Food Policy Council, and LiveWell Lawrence Health Coalition. Horn's hobbies include hiking and traveling with her family.

During the 2018 Kansas gubernatorial election, Horn endorsed the eventual nominee, State Senator Laura Kelly, in the Democratic primary. Kelly would go on to defeat Republican Kris Kobach and Independent Greg Orman in the general election, becoming the 48th Governor of Kansas.
