= Lauren Bohi =

American politician

Member of the Kansas House of Representatives from the 15th district
- Incumbent
- Assumed office January 13, 2025
- Preceded by: Allison Hougland

Personal details
- Party: Republican
- Profession: Office manager, behavioral health
- Website: laurenforolathe.com

Lauren Bohi is an American politician from Kansas that currently represents the 15th district of the Kansas House of Representatives since 2024 as a Republican.

== Biography ==
Bohi earned degrees in organizational management and spanish at MidAmerica Nazarene University. Bohi worked in both small businesses and non-profits, including a local behavioral health facility.

=== Kansas House of Representatives ===
Bohi challenged incumbent Democrat Allison Hougland in one of the most competitive races in the 2024 Kansas election. Bohi would go on to win with 51% of the vote to Hougland's 49%.
