= Kansas's 23rd Senate district =

American legislative district

Kansas's 23rd State Senate district
Senator
Adam Thomas; R–Olathe
- Demographics: 75% White; 6% Black; 11% Hispanic; 4% Asian; 3% Other
- Population (2018): 73,147

Kansas's 23rd Senate district is one of 40 districts in the Kansas Senate. It has been represented by Republican Adam Thomas since 2025.

== Geography ==
District 23 covers much of Olathe in the south-central Johnson County suburbs of Kansas City.

The district is located entirely within Kansas's 3rd congressional district, and overlaps with the 14th, 15th, 26th, 49th, and 78th districts of the Kansas House of Representatives.

== Recent election results ==
=== 2020 ===
2020 Kansas Senate election, District 23
Primary election
Party	Candidate	Votes	%
Republican	Robert Olson (incumbent)	4,913	58.2
Republican	Chris Lengquist	3,530	41.8
Total votes		8,443	100
General election
Republican	Robert Olson (incumbent)	20,235	53.1
Democratic	Wendy Budetti	17,864	46.9
Total votes		38,099	100
Republican hold			

=== 2016 ===
2016 Kansas Senate election, District 23
Party	Candidate	Votes	%
Republican	Robert Olson (incumbent)	19,277	60.6
Democratic	Spencer Kerfoot	12,551	39.4
Total votes		31,828	100
Republican hold			

=== 2012 ===
2012 Kansas Senate election, District 23
Party	Candidate	Votes	%
Republican	Robert Olson (incumbent)	18,859	63.0
Democratic	Steve Wright	11,098	37.0
Total votes		29,957	100
Republican hold			

=== Federal and statewide results ===
Year	Office	Results
2020	President	Biden 49.4 – 48.1%
2018	Governor	Kelly 49.7 – 42.2%
2016	President	Trump 52.4 – 39.7%
2012	President	Romney 61.2 – 36.9%
