= Adam Thomas (politician) =

American Republican politician

Member of the Kansas Senate from the 23rd district
- Incumbent
- Assumed office January 13, 2025
- Preceded by: Robert S. Olson

Member of the Kansas House of Representatives from the 26th district
- In office January 14, 2019 – January 13, 2025
- Preceded by: Larry Campbell
- Succeeded by: Chip VanHouden

Personal details
- Born: St. Charles, Missouri, U.S.
- Party: Republican
- Spouse: Kristin Thomas
- Children: 5
- Education: Belmont University

Adam Thomas is an American politician who has been a Republican member of the Kansas Senate for the 23rd district since 2025. Previously, he served as a member of the Kansas House of Representatives from the 26th district from 2019 to 2025.

== Early life and education ==
Thomas was born in St. Charles, Missouri, and raised in Olathe, Kansas. He attended Belmont University.

== Career ==
Outside of politics, Thomas works as a restaurant manager. He was elected to the Kansas House of Representatives in 2018 and assumed office in 2019.

During his campaign, he faced accusations that he lived outside his district. He was later charged with election perjury for giving a false address on election documents and reached a diversionary agreement.

In the 2021–2022 legislative session, he served as vice chair of the House Education Committee.

On June 22, 2023, Thomas filed to run for the 23rd Senate district in 2024. Rob Olson, the Republican incumbent, opted not to seek reelection.
