= A Penny for My Thoughts =

Tabletop role-playing game by Paul Tevis

A Penny for My Thoughts is a role-playing game by Paul Tevis, published by Evil Hat Productions in 2009.

== Description ==
A Penny for My Thoughts is a storytelling game involving amnesiac characters who ask leading questions of each other to find out their histories.

== Publication history ==
Paul Tevis released his game, A Penny for My Thoughts, in the summer of 2009 through Evil Hat Productions. According to Tevis, the game grew out of his entry into the Game Chef 2007 competition.

== Reception ==
Shannon Appelcline describes A Penny for My Thoughts as "the sort of storytelling game that Hogshead Publishing had been producing in its 'New Style' line a decade before". Wired called the game "very clever".

A Penny for My Thoughts won the 2009 Indie RPG Awards for Most Innovative Game.
