= Mike Storm =

American politician

Member of the Kansas House of Representatives from the 121st district
- Incumbent
- Assumed office March 12, 2026
- Preceded by: John Resman

Personal details
- Party: Republican

Mike Storm is an American politician. A member of the Republican Party, he has served as a member of the Kansas House of Representatives since March 2026, representing the 121st district. He succeeded John Resman, who died in office earlier that month.
