= John Toplikar =

American politician

John Toplinkar

Member of the Kansas House of Representatives from the 15th district
- In office January 11, 1993 – January 13, 2003
- Preceded by: Ruth Hackler
- Succeeded by: Arlen Siegfreid
- In office January 14, 2019 – July 2022
- Preceded by: Erin Davis
- Succeeded by: Matt Bingesser

Personal details
- Born: February 24, 1956 (age 70) Olathe, Kansas, U.S.
- Party: Republican
- Spouse: Dianne
- Education: University of Kansas (BA); Washburn University (JD)

John Toplikar (February 24, 1956) is an American politician who served as a Republican member of the Kansas House of Representatives from the 15th district, serving from 1993 to 2003 and again from 2019 to 2022.

== Early life and education ==
Toplikar was born and raised in Olathe, Kansas. After attending Johnson County Community College, he earned a Bachelor of Arts degree in communications from the University of Kansas and a Juris Doctor from the Washburn University School of Law.

== Career ==
From 1989 to 1991, Toplikar was a city official in Olathe. He was elected to the Johnson County Commission in 2003. Toplinkar served as a member of the Kansas House of Representatives from 1992 to 2002. Toplinkar has also worked as a carpenter and contractor. In 2014, he was an unsuccessful candidate for Kansas insurance commissioner, placing fifth in the Republican primary. In the 2018 election, Toplikar ran unopposed in the Republican primary and defeated Democratic nominee Chris Haulmark in the November general election. He resigned in July 2022 after suffering a heart attack.
