= Larry Campbell (Kansas politician) =

American politician

Member of the Kansas House of Representatives from the 26th district
- In office January 14, 2013 – February 5, 2018
- Preceded by: Robert Montgomery
- Succeeded by: Adam Thomas
- In office January 13, 1997 – January 10, 2005
- Preceded by: Vince Snowbarger
- Succeeded by: Robert S. Olson

Personal details
- Born: May 17, 1955 (age 71) Olathe, Kansas, U.S.
- Party: Republican
- Spouse: Gigi
- Profession: Banker, professor

Larry Campbell (born February 20, 1951) is an American politician. He had served as a Republican member for the 26th district in the Kansas House of Representatives from 1997 to 2005 and 2013 to 2018.
