= John Resman =

American politician (1955–2026)

Member of the Kansas House of Representatives from the 121st district
- In office February 13, 2017 – March 2, 2026
- Preceded by: Mike Kiegerl
- Succeeded by: Mike Storm

Personal details
- Born: April 4, 1955 Passaic, New Jersey, U.S.
- Died: March 2, 2026 (aged 70) Olathe, Kansas, U.S.
- Party: Republican
- Spouse: Elizabeth
- Profession: Deputy sheriff

John Resman (April 4, 1955 – March 2, 2026) was an American politician. He served as a Republican member for the 121st district in the Kansas House of Representatives from 2017 to 2026.

== Early life ==
Resman attended high school and college in New Jersey prior to joining the United States Army in 1976. During his Army service, he was stationed at the United States Disciplinary Barracks at Fort Leavenworth, Kansas, as a military policeman/corrections specialist. Following active military service, he became a Correctional Officer with the Federal Bureau of Prisons at the U. S. Penitentiary, Leavenworth, Kansas, and two years later transferred to the Federal Correctional Institution at Otisville, New York.

== Law enforcement career ==
In November 1982, Resman returned to Kansas and began a career with the Johnson County Sheriff’s Office. He served 28 years with the sheriff's office, retiring as a Captain in 2010. In 2014, the Kansas Bureau of Investigation launched a statewide investigation to determine how many sexual assault kits had not been submitted for laboratory testing by law enforcement agencies across Kansas. As part of that investigation, the KBI found that 140 kits had not been submitted from Johnson County law enforcement agencies during the time when Resman was on the command staff at the Johnson County Sheriff’s Office and was a supervisor for the Investigations Division.

During his retirement, Resman ran for the office of Johnson County Sheriff in 2016. In the race for the Republican nomination, Resman expressed views that were remarkably consistent to those of Calvin Hayden, who ultimately won the nomination and the general election. While in office, Hayden was involved in controversy related to the legitimacy of the 2020 United States presidential election, using county resources to launch an investigation into the election's outcomes, despite assertions from the Kansas Secretary of State that claims of irregularities in the election are "baseless".

== Kansas House of Representatives ==
In February, 2017, Resman was chosen by Republican Precinct Committee Members to succeed Representative Mike Kiegerl, who announced his resignation from the Kansas House of Representatives for health reasons.

=== Tax policy ===
Resman stated early in his tenure that "every tax dollar sent to Topeka should be spent wisely and efficiently". Just a week after taking office, he was in an extreme minority of the legislature and his own party in voting to sustain Governor Sam Brownback's veto of a tax bill that the Legislature passed to raise funds to cover the state's $1 billion budget deficit.

=== Medicaid Expansion ===
As of 2022, Kansas was one of 12 states that has not passed Medicaid expansion, though it remains a measure that a large majority of Kansans support. Resman never supported Medicaid expansion, stating as late as October, 2022 that he continued to oppose it on the grounds that it would cost "who knows the amount of money". Kansas is projected to have a $3.1 billion budget surplus through July, 2023, while the state's annual share of the cost to expand Medicaid is estimated at $50 million.

=== Abortion ===
Resman believed that human life "begins with conception and must be safeguarded." He was endorsed by Kansans for Life, an anti-abortion organization, and the Value Them Both organization thanked Resman for voting to pass their proposed amendment that would have removed a woman's right to an abortion from the Kansas constitution. The amendment was defeated by Kansas voters by an 18-point margin in August, 2022.

== Death ==
Resman died in Olathe, Kansas, on March 2, 2026, at the age of 70.
