= Erin Davis (politician) =

American politician

Member of the Kansas House of Representatives from the 15th district
- In office January 13, 2014 – January 14, 2019
- Preceded by: Robert Montgomery
- Succeeded by: John Toplikar

Personal details
- Born: July 8, 1972 (age 54)
- Party: Republican

Erin Davis (July 8, 1972) is a Republican former member of the Kansas House of Representatives, representing the 15th Kansas House district (central Olathe, Kansas). She was reelected in 2016. Davis was hired as a lobbyist by the Cerner Corporation in 2017, and questions were raised about the appearance of conflicts of interest. As a consequence, she was removed from her post on the House Appropriations Committee. She asserted that there was no conflict because her lobbying duties were confined to states other than Kansas, but in response, her job was changed at Cerner. Kansas has a "citizen's legislature" which is a part-time occupation for most legislators. She declined to run for reelection in 2018.
