= Jane Eldredge =

American politician

Member of the Kansas Senate from the 2nd district
- In office 1981–1982
- Preceded by: Arnold Berman
- Succeeded by: Wint Winter Jr.

Personal details
- Born: February 8, 1944 (age 82) Norwalk, Connecticut
- Party: Republican
- Spouse: Charles Child Eldredge III
- Children: 2
- Education: Smith College (B.A.); University of Kansas (J.D.)

Jane MacDougal Eldredge (born February 8, 1944) is a politician and attorney from the U.S. state of Kansas. She served as a member of the Kansas State Senate from the 2nd district in 1981 and 1982, being replaced by Wint Winter Jr.

Eldredge was born in Norwalk, Connecticut and attended Smith College as an undergraduate. She moved to Kansas and attended the University of Kansas for law school, graduating in 1977 and joining the Kansas Bar the same year. Eldredge served two years in the Kansas State Senate, where she was a member of the Governor's Task Force on Battered Women.
