= Chip VanHouden =

American politician

Member of the Kansas House of Representatives from the 26th district
- Incumbent
- Assumed office January 13, 2025
- Preceded by: Adam Thomas

Personal details
- Party: Republican
- Profession: Sales Rep.

Chip VanHouden is an American politician from Kansas that currently represents the 26th district of the Kansas House of Representatives since 2024 as a Republican.

== Biography ==
VanHouden would win election to the 26th district unopposed, replacing fellow Republican Adam Thomas who ran for the Kansas Senate.
