= Arden Booth =

American politician (1911–2000)

Member of the Kansas Senate from the 2nd district
- In office 1971–1976
- Preceded by: Reynolds Shultz

Personal details
- Born: December 4, 1911 Fairview, Kansas, US
- Died: March 10, 2000 (aged 88) Lawrence, Kansas, US
- Party: Republican
- Spouse: Bette Mills
- Children: 2
- Education: Baker University

George Arden Booth (December 4, 1911–March 10, 2000) was an American politician who served as the Kansas State Senator from the 2nd district from 1971 to 1976.

== Early life ==
Born in Fairview, Kansas, Booth was the eighth of nine children. He was an active member of 4-H, and showed an early interest in music and broadcasting; he made his radio debut in 1927, after winning a contest whose prize was singing on-air. Booth attended Baker University, graduating with a B.S. in music in 1936. After spending several years teaching music in Kansas and a short time studying voice in New York City, he joined the military and was stationed in Oahu during World War II, where he worked in the entertainment division of the Special Services. While in Hawaii, he married Bette Mills in 1946, and shortly thereafter returned to Kansas.

== Career ==
Settling in Lawrence, Booth and his wife cofounded KLWN, an AM radio station, in 1951 (the station expanded to also broadcast in FM in 1963). Booth was a broadcaster as well as owning the station, once appearing on-air for 62 hours straight during a flood weeks after the station began transmitting.

He would go on to serve as the president of the Kansas Association of Broadcasters, and remained active in radio until his death.

In addition to his radio work, Booth was a rancher, owning a registered herd of horned Hereford cattle; this experience led to his being selected as president of the National Agricultural Center and Hall of Fame.

== Politics ==
In 1970, Reynolds Shultz resigned the 2nd District Senate seat after being elected as Lieutenant Governor, and Booth was selected to fill out the remainder of his term, taking office in 1971. He successfully ran for re-election in 1972. During his time in the State Senate, Booth introduced legislation that would grant in-state tuition to Kansas residents attending Haskell Indian Nations University, and was instrumental in creating Kansas' first small claims court.
