= Marci Francisco =

American politician

Member of the Kansas Senate from the 2nd district
- Incumbent
- Assumed office January 10, 2005
- Preceded by: Mark Buhler

Personal details
- Born: April 22, 1950 (age 76) Prairie Village, Kansas, U.S.
- Party: Democratic
- Spouse: Joe Bickford
- Education: University of Kansas (BA, BArch)

Marci Francisco (born April 22, 1950) is an American politician who currently serves as the Kansas State Senator from the 2nd district, a position she has held since 2005.

== Early career ==
She was a city commissioner of Lawrence, Kansas, from 1979 to 1983, and served as mayor from 1981 to 1983. She was a space analyst at the University of Kansas.

== Political career ==
In 2004, she defeated Mark Buhler, the appointed Republican incumbent, with 49% of the vote, versus 43% for Buhler. Jim Mullins of the Reform party finished third, with 7%. In 2008, she defeated Republican Scott Morgan, 21,069 to 12,540 votes. In 2012, her margin was 64.5% over Republican Ron Ellis 35.4%. In 2016, her margin was 66.1% over Republican Meredith Richey's 33.8%.

Francisco was the Democratic nominee for Kansas State Treasurer in 2018, finishing second, with 42.26% of the vote.

Party political offices
Preceded by Carmen Alldritt	Democratic nominee for Treasurer of Kansas; 2018	Succeeded by Lynn Rogers
