= Mike Kiegerl =

American politician

Member of the Kansas House of Representatives from the 121st district
- In office September 3, 2013 – February 15, 2017
- Preceded by: Arlen Siegfreid
- Succeeded by: John Resman

Member of the Kansas House of Representatives from the 43rd district
- In office January 10, 2005 – January 14, 2013
- Preceded by: John Ballou
- Succeeded by: Bill Sutton

Personal details
- Born: April 8, 1939 Mannheim, Germany
- Died: February 1, 2024 (aged 84)
- Party: Republican
- Spouse: Peggy
- Children: 3
- Education: University of Illinois Chicago
- Profession: executive

Siegfried Mathias "Mike" Kiegerl (April 8, 1939 – February 1, 2024) was an American politician who served as a Republican member of the Kansas House of Representatives from 2005 to 2017.

Kiegerl founded and was the CEO of PRM Incorporated. He had a BA in Business and Economics from the University of Illinois Chicago, and an Master of Business Administration in International Management from American Graduate School.

== Issue positions ==
Kiegerl's official website listed his legislative priorities:

- We must address the separation of powers issue again
- Continue to reform Workers Compensation
- Increase benefits to injured workers and increase the cap on permanent total disability benefits without raising rates.
- We must assure that our schools get more funding than provided by the very flawed bill passed this year.
- Educating the population of Kansas on fiscal policy and economics.

== Committee membership ==
- Joint Committee on Children's Issues (Chair)
- Federal and State Affairs (Vice-Chair)
- Social Services Budget

== Major Donors ==
The top 5 donors to Kiegerl's 2008 campaign:

- 1. Kiegerl, S M $2,386
- 2. Kiegerl, S Mike $1,368
- 3. Kansas Realtors Assoc $900
- 4. Kansas Credit Union $800
- 5. Koch Industries $800
