= Arlen Siegfreid =

American politician (1946–2020)

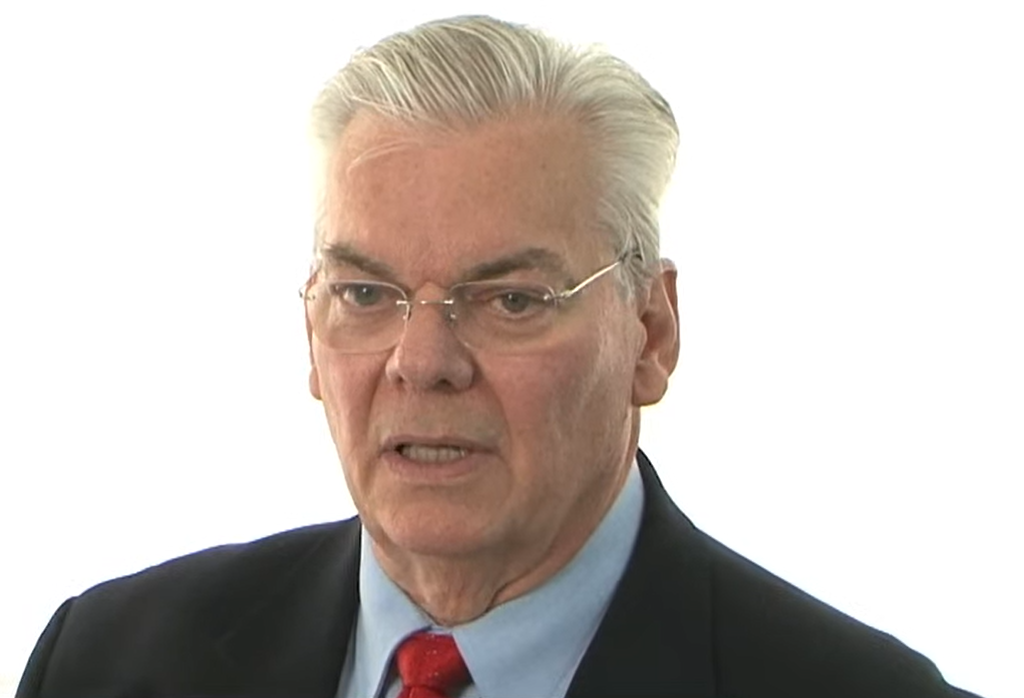
- Siegfreid in 2012

Member of the Kansas House of Representatives from the 121st district
- In office January 14, 2013 – July 9, 2013
- Preceded by: Rick Billinger
- Succeeded by: Mike Kiegerl

Member of the Kansas House of Representatives from the 15th district
- In office January 13, 2003 – January 14, 2013
- Preceded by: John Toplikar
- Succeeded by: Robert Montgomery

Personal details
- Born: August 23, 1946 Newton, Kansas
- Died: April 11, 2020 (aged 73)
- Party: Republican
- Spouse: Barbara Siegfried
- Children: 5

Arlen Herbert Siegfreid (August 23, 1946 - April 11, 2020) was a Republican member of the Kansas House of Representatives, representing the 15th district from 2003 to 2013 and the 121st district briefly from 2013 until his resignation a few months later.

== Issue positions ==
Siegfreid's website lists his legislative goals as "Quality Education, Economic Development, Control of Government Growth & Taxes, Public Safety & Security, and Family Values."

== Committee membership ==
- Interstate Cooperation (Chair)
- Taxation
- Education Budget
- Calendar and Printing
- Legislative Budget.

== Major donors ==
The top 5 donors to Siegfreid's 2008 campaign:

- 1. Kansas Bankers Assoc $1,000
- 2. Koch Industries $1,000
- 3. Kansas Medical Society $1,000
- 4. Embarq $1,000
- 5. Kansas Republican Party $1,000
