= Vicki Schmidt =

American politician (born 1955)

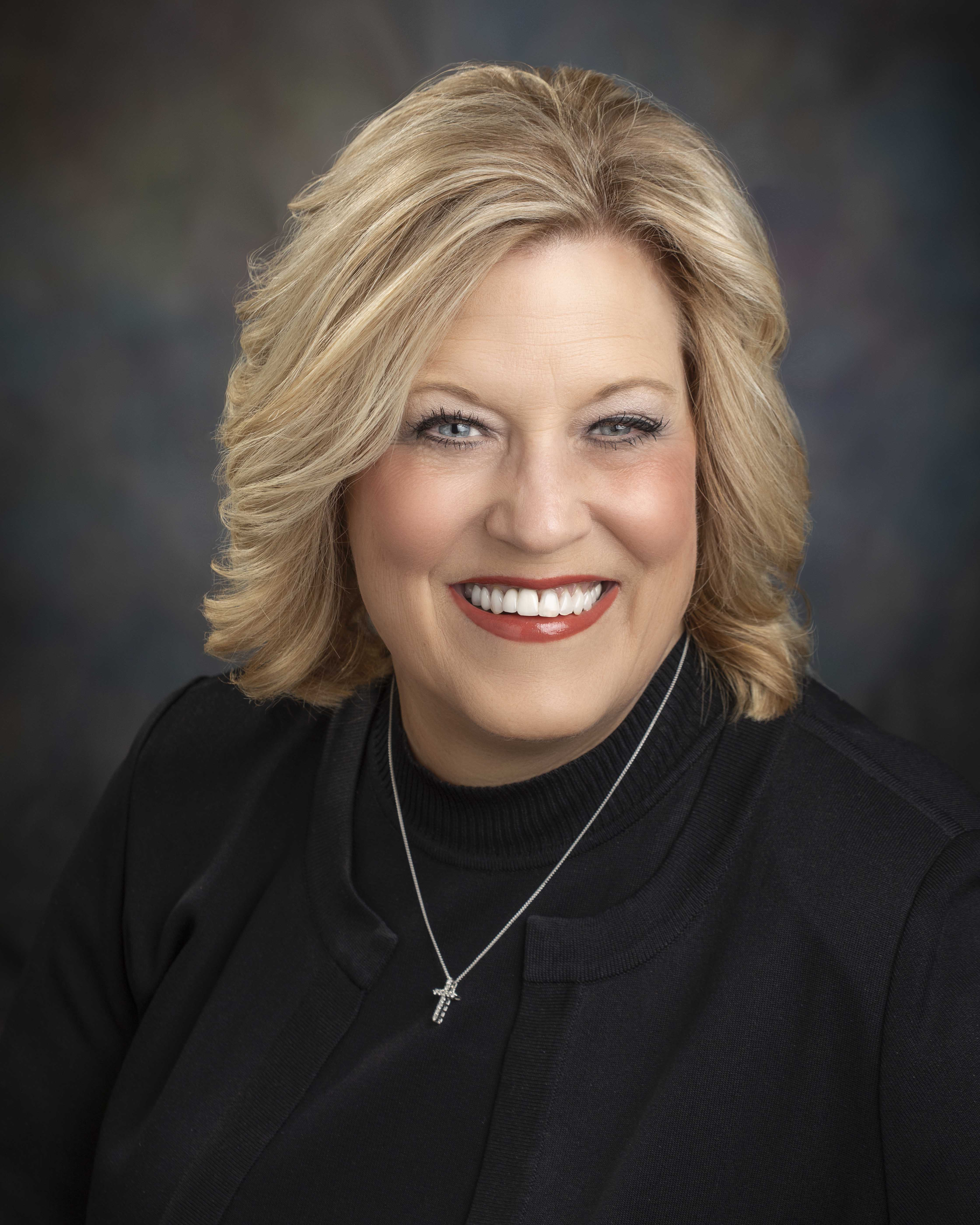
- Schmidt in 2023

26th Insurance Commissioner of Kansas
- Incumbent
- Assumed office January 14, 2019
- Governor: Laura Kelly
- Preceded by: Ken Selzer

Member of the Kansas Senate from the 20th district
- In office January 10, 2005 – January 14, 2019
- Preceded by: Bill Bunten
- Succeeded by: Eric Rucker

Personal details
- Born: Vicki Ensz; September 15, 1955 (age 71) Wichita, Kansas, U.S.
- Party: Republican
- Spouse: Michael
- Children: 2
- Education: University of Kansas (BS)
- Website: Campaign website

Vicki Schmidt (born September 15, 1955) is an American politician who is currently the Kansas Insurance Commissioner. She was a Republican member of the Kansas Senate, representing the 20th district, from 2005 to 2019. She also served as the Senate Assistant Majority Leader from 2009 to 2012, and from 2017 to 2019. She was elected Kansas Insurance Commissioner in 2018, and re-elected in 2022.

== Early life ==
Schmidt attended Wichita South High School in Wichita, Kansas, where she met her future husband. After high school, she attended the University of Kansas and graduated from the school's pharmacy program.

== Kansas Senate ==
In the Kansas Senate, Schmidt served as chairwoman of the Public Health and Welfare Committee, Joint Committee on Administrative Rules and Regulations, and the State Employee Pay Plan Oversight Committee. Additionally, she served on the Health Care Stabilization Fund Oversight Committee, and the education, financial institutions and insurance, transportation committees.

== Kansas Department of Insurance ==
Schmidt was elected Kansas Insurance Commissioner in 2018, and reelected in 2022, where she received the highest percentage of the vote of any statewide candidate.

In October 2023, Schmidt announced a reduction of producer licensing fees for 2024. It is estimated that these reductions will be reduced by a total of $1.2 million.

The department has staff who regularly assist Kansans answer insurance-related questions and resolve insurance issues. This includes assisting individuals with previously denied claims. During 2023, the department assisted with recovering $16 million for Kansas policyholders with disputes with their insurance companies. 2023 marks the largest single-year recovery in the history of the department. Since the beginning of Schmidt's tenure as commissioner in 2019, the department has recovered $35 million in total. In 2024, the department recovered $11.8 million for Kansas policyholders.

In early 2024, Schmidt introduced legislation to protect Kansas investors, including the Protect Vulnerable Adults from Financial Exploitation Act, which was signed into law. As of July 1, 2024, the new law strengthened the ability of Kansas Department of Insurance and financial advisers to protect seniors and vulnerable adults from financial abuse and fraud. Various organizations, including financial adviser firms and AARP supported the legislation.

In April 2025, legislation introduced by the department to eliminate regulatory fees, lower the premium tax, and reduce the cost of doing business in Kansas were signed into law.

=== Breast cancer detection ===
As a breast cancer survivor, Schmidt introduced legislation that would eliminate out-of-pocket costs for breast cancer screenings like MRIs and ultrasounds. It is estimated by the Susan G. Komen Foundation that these costs can exceed $1,000. Another study showed that one in five patients would not seek follow-up appointments because of the costs.

== 2026 Kansas gubernatorial campaign ==
Schmidt ran as a candidate for the Republican nomination in the 2026 gubernatorial election in Kansas with state representative Joe Newland as her running mate. In the Republican primary, the Schmidt-Newland ticket finished third, losing the nomination to Kansas Senate president Ty Masterson and state senator Jeff Klemp.

== Personal life ==
In May 2023, Schmidt was diagnosed with breast cancer following a routine mammogram. She underwent surgery and radiation treatments, and became cancer free in September. Following her battle with cancer, Schmidt has continuously encouraged other women in Kansas to undergo routine mammogram screenings.

Schmidt lives in Topeka with her husband Mike. They have been married for over fifty years, have two children, and four grandchildren.

Party political offices
| Preceded by Ken Selzer | Republican nominee for Insurance Commissioner of Kansas; 2018, 2022 | Most recent |
Political offices
| Preceded by Ken Selzer | Insurance Commissioner of Kansas; 2019–present | Incumbent |
