= Senator Eldridge =

Senator Eldridge may refer to:

- Charles W. Eldridge (1877–1965), Massachusetts State Senate
- Frank Eldridge Jr. (1932–2006), Georgia State Senate
- Jamie Eldridge (born 1973), Massachusetts State Senate

== See also ==
- Senator Eldredge (disambiguation)
