= Tony Browne (rugby union) =

Rugby union player from Northern Ireland

- Full name: Antony William Browne
- Born: 1929 or 1930
- Died: 1 January 2010 (aged 80)
- School: Royal School Dungannon
- University: Trinity College Dublin
- Occupation: Doctor

Rugby union career
- Position: Centre
International career
Years	Team	Apps	(Points)
1951	Ireland	1	(3)

Antony William Browne (1929 or 1930 – 1 January 2010) was an Irish international rugby union player.

== Biography ==
Educated at Royal School Dungannon, Browne was an Ulster Schools representative player. He played rugby at Trinity College and won selection for a 1951 home international against the Springboks. In what would be his only match for Ireland, Browne scored his team's only try, dodging past three South Africans in the process.

Browne was a doctor by profession and immigrated to southern Africa.

== See also ==
- List of Ireland national rugby union players
