= Robert S. Olson =

American politician

Robert Olson

Member of the Kansas Senate from the 23rd district
- In office January 10, 2011 – January 13, 2025
- Preceded by: Karin Brownlee
- Succeeded by: Brad Starnes

Member of the Kansas House of Representatives from the 26th district
- In office January 10, 2005 – January 10, 2011
- Preceded by: Larry Campbell
- Succeeded by: Robert Montgomery

Personal details
- Born: December 1, 1969 (age 56) WaKeeney, Kansas, U.S.
- Party: Republican
- Spouse: Rachel Olson
- Profession: State Senator

Robert S. Olson (born December 1, 1969) is an American politician who served as a Republican member of the Kansas Senate, representing the 23rd district from 2011 to 2025. He was previously a Representative in the Kansas House of Representatives, representing the 26th district from 2005 to 2011, having served as the Majority Whip. Olson was appointed to the Kansas Senate following Karin Brownlee's nomination to serve as Kansas Secretary of Labor. On February 13, 2023, Olson announced he would not seek reelection to his Senate seat.

== Senate committee membership ==
- Commerce
- Former Chairman - Financial Institutions and Insurance
- Current Chairman of Senate Utilities Committee

== House committee membership ==
- Joint Committee on Pensions, Investments and Benefits (Chairman)
- Federal and State Affairs
- Financial Institutions
- Insurance
- Select Committee on KPERS
- Energy and Utilities
