= Paul Tevis =

American game designer and podcaster

Paul Tevis at Gamex 2007

Paul Tevis is a tabletop role-playing game designer and podcaster. He designed the game A Penny for My Thoughts, which won an Indie RPG Award, and hosted the podcast Have Games, Will Travel, which won an ENNIE Award.

== Career ==
Tevis began his career in gaming as a "Man in Black" for Steve Jackson Games, demoing games from their catalog at conventions. He also worked for Atlas Games in a similar capacity. Tevis released his own game, A Penny for My Thoughts, in the summer of 2009 through Evil Hat Productions.

Tevis' original podcast, Have Games, Will Travel discussed games, game design, and gamer subculture. It ran for more than one hundred episodes beginning in July 2005. A typical show featured Tevis' reviews of several games. The final episode was released January 1, 2010. From October 2006 to October 2009, Tevis co-hosted the podcast The Voice with Brennan Taylor of Indie Press Revolution. The Voice was a house organ of IPR, presenting updates on new products available and featuring reviews, interviews, and game design advice.

== Awards ==
Have Games, Will Travel won an Ennie for "Best Podcast" in 2007, the first year that the category existed. A Penny for My Thoughts won the 2009 Indie RPG Awards for Most Innovative Game.
