= Tony Brown (defensive back, born 1970) =

American football player

No. 22, 29
- Position: Defensive back

Personal information
- Born: May 15, 1970 (age 56); Bangkok, Thailand
- Listed height: 5 ft 9 in (1.75 m)
- Listed weight: 183 lb (83 kg)

Career information
- High school: John F. Kennedy (Los Angeles, California, U.S.)
- College: Fresno State
- NFL draft: 1992: 5th round, 135th overall pick

Career history
- Houston Oilers (1992–1993); Seattle Seahawks (1994–1995)

Career NFL statistics
- Tackles: 69
- Forced fumbles: 1
- Stats at Pro Football Reference

Anthony Lamar Brown (born May 15, 1970) is a former professional American football player who played defensive back for two seasons for the Houston Oilers and Seattle Seahawks. He was selected by the Oilers in the fifth round of the 1992 NFL draft.

Brown is a graduate of Kennedy High School in Granada Hills, California and former high school teammate of professional football player Mark McMillian.
