= Antonio Brown (wide receiver, born 1978) =

American football player (born 1978)

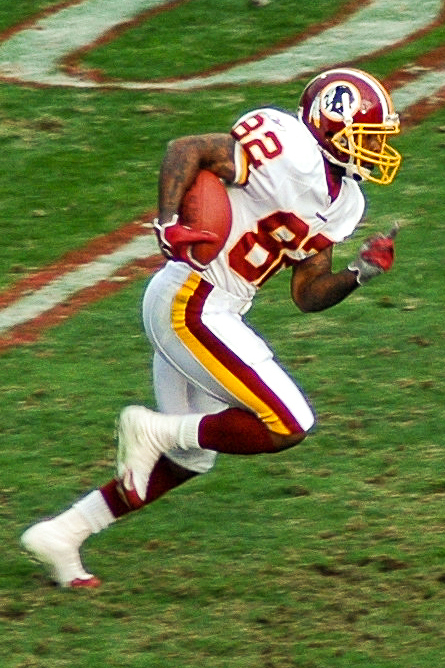
- Brown running a kickoff return for a touchdown in 2005

No. 9, 86, 82
- Positions: Wide receiver, return specialist

Personal information
- Born: March 3, 1978 (age 48); Miami, Florida, U.S.
- Listed height: 5 ft 10 in (1.78 m)
- Listed weight: 175 lb (79 kg)

Career information
- High school: Miami Central (West Little River, Florida)
- College: West Virginia (1998–2001)
- NFL draft: 2002: undrafted

Career history
- Winnipeg Blue Bombers (2002); Buffalo Bills (2003); Washington Redskins (2004–2005)

Career NFL statistics
- Kickoff return yards: 1,551
- Punt return yards: 263
- Return touchdowns: 1
- Stats at Pro Football Reference

Antonio Duval Brown (born March 3, 1978) is an American former professional football player who was a wide receiver and return specialist for the Buffalo Bills and Washington Redskins of the National Football League (NFL). He played college football for the West Virginia Mountaineers. He also played for the Winnipeg Blue Bombers of the Canadian Football League (CFL).

== Early life ==
Brown attended Miami Central High School in Miami, Florida.

== College career ==
Brown played college football for the West Virginia Mountaineers from 1998 to 2001. He played in 11 games his freshman year in 1998, catching 23 passes for 275 yards and one touchdown while also returning 19 kicks for 381 yards. He appeared in nine games in 1999, totaling 50 receptions for 462 yards and one touchdown and 12 punt returns for 107 yards and one touchdown. Brown played in 12 games in 2000, catching 51 passes for 877 yards and three touchdowns, rushing 23 times for 126 yards and one touchdown, and returning 27 punts for 207 yards. He appeared in 10 games in 2001, recording 31 receptions for 291 yards and one touchdown.

Brown recorded career totals of 155 receptions for 1,905 yards and six touchdowns, 49 punt returns for 402 and one touchdown, 23 kick returns for 428 yards, and 40 rushes for 247 yards and one touchdown.

== Professional career ==
Brown was signed by the Winnipeg Blue Bombers in 2002. He played in five games for the Blue Bombers in 2002, catching 14 passes for 208 yards and two touchdowns.

Brown left the Blue Bombers to sign with the Buffalo Bills on March 24, 2003. He played in all 16 games during his NFL rookie year in 2003, returning 48 kicks for 1,046 yards and 25 punts for 111 yards. He was waived on August 31, 2004.

Brown was signed by the Washington Redskins on November 3, 2004. He appeared in three games for the Redskins in 2004, returning one kick for 66 yards and 10 punts for 89 yards. He was waived on September 13, 2005 but later re-signed with the team on November 23, 2005. Brown played in seven games during the 2005 season, returning 19 kicks for 439 yards and one touchdown while also returning 13 punts for 63 yards. He was waived on April 28, 2006.

== Personal life ==
Brown's son, Malachi Toney, plays college football as a wide receiver for the Miami Hurricanes.
