= Tony Brown (Kansas politician) =

American politician

Member of the Kansas House of Representatives from the 10th district
- In office January 12, 2009 – January 10, 2011
- Preceded by: Tom Holland
- Succeeded by: Terri Gregory

Personal details
- Born: August 15, 1961 (age 64) Carmi, Illinois, U.S.
- Party: Democratic
- Spouse: Becky Henderson
- Children: 1
- Education: Vanderbilt University

Anthony L. Brown (August 15, 1961) is a former Democratic member of the Kansas House of Representatives, who represented the 10th district. He served from 2009 - 2011. Brown ran for re-election in 2010, but was defeated by Republican TerriLois Gregory.

Prior to his election to the House, Brown served on the Baldwin City City Council from 2004-2008. He received Master's and Doctoral degrees from Vanderbilt University, and has worked as a professor at Baker University.

A member of the local Chamber of Commerce and Lions club, Brown lives in Baldwin City with his wife Becky and daughter Halley.

== Committee membership ==
- Energy and Utilities
- Higher Education
- Agriculture
- Natural Resources

== Major donors ==
The top 5 donors to Brown's 2008 campaign:

- 1. Brown, Tony $51,644
- 2. Kansas Democratic Party $26,500
- 3. Kansas National Education Assoc $1,000
- 4. Kansas AFL $500
- 5. Kansas Trial Lawyers Assoc $500
