= Thomas Sloan (Kansas politician) =

American politician

Member of the Kansas House of Representatives from the 45th district
- In office January 9, 1995 – January 14, 2019
- Preceded by: Forrest Swall
- Succeeded by: Mike Amyx

Personal details
- Born: March 5, 1946 (age 80) Holyoke, Colorado, United States
- Party: Republican
- Spouse: Gail
- Education: Syracuse University, BA; Michigan State University; University of North Carolina at Chapel Hill

Thomas "Tom" Sloan (born March 5, 1946) was a member of the Kansas House of Representatives for the 45th district, which covers Northwestern Douglas County, including western Lawrence. He served from 1995 to 2019. He is a member of the Republican Party. He previously served in the Kansas State Senate from 1983 to 1985 and 1986 to 1989.

Born in Holyoke, Colorado, Sloan grew up on a farm in rural Colorado. He received his BA from Syracuse University in 1968, his MA from Michigan State University in 1969, and PhD in Political Science from the University of North Carolina at Chapel Hill in 1977.

Sloan moved to Kansas in the late 1970s when he became an assistant professor at Kansas State University. Sloan has also worked as Executive Director of Western Resources, Government Affairs Representative for the Getty Oil Company, and associate executive director of the Kansas State Nurses Association.

Sloan has a reputation as a moderate Republican.

== Issue positions ==
Sloan's website lists his legislative priorities as education, health care, energy, and water.

== Committee membership ==
- Vision 2020 (Chair)
- Energy and Utilities
- Government Efficiency and Fiscal Oversight
- Joint Committee on Energy and Environmental Policy

== Major Donors ==
The top 5 donors to Sloan's 2008 campaign:

- 1. Kansas Medical Society $1,000
- 2. Kansans for Lifesaving Cures $1,000
- 3. Kansas Contractors Assoc $1,000
- 4. Koch Industries $1,000
- 5. AT&T $1,000
