= Ken Selzer =

American politician

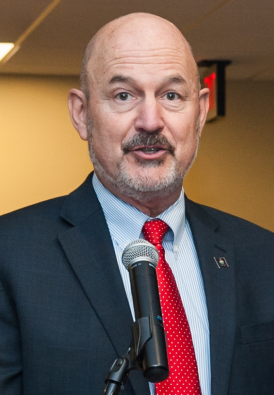

25th Kansas Insurance Commissioner
- In office January 12, 2015 – January 14, 2019
- Governor: Sam Brownback; Jeff Colyer
- Preceded by: Sandy Praeger
- Succeeded by: Vicki Schmidt

Personal details
- Born: April 25, 1953 (age 73) Goessel, Kansas, U.S.
- Party: Republican
- Education: Kansas State University (BS); University of Southern California (MBA)
- Website: Campaign website

Ken Selzer (born April 25, 1953) is an American politician who served as the Kansas Insurance Commissioner from 2015 to 2019. He ran for Governor of Kansas in the 2018 gubernatorial election and came in fourth in the Republican primary with 7.82% of the vote. Selzer previously served as a Fairway, Kansas, City Councilman and City Council President.

Party political offices
Preceded by Sandy Praeger	Republican nominee for Kansas Insurance Commissioner; 2014	Succeeded by Vicki Schmidt
Political offices
Preceded by Sandy Praeger	Insurance Commissioner of Kansas; 2015–2019	Succeeded by Vicki Schmidt
