= Winton A. Winter Sr. =

American politician

Wint Winter, Sr.

Member of the Kansas Senate from the 11th district
- In office January 8, 1973 – January 12, 1981
- Preceded by: Lester Arvin
- Succeeded by: Jim L. Allen

Member of the Kansas Senate from the 6th district
- In office January 12, 1969 – January 8, 1973
- Preceded by: Reynolds Shultz
- Succeeded by: John Steineger

Personal details
- Born: August 23, 1930
- Died: May 4, 2013 (aged 82) Lawrence, Kansas, U.S.
- Party: Republican
- Spouse: Nancy Mae Morsbach (m. 1952)
- Children: Winton A. Winter, Jr., 4 others
- Education: University of Kansas
- Profession: Attorney

Military service
- Allegiance: United States
- Branch/service: United States Marine Corps
- Rank: Captain
- Battles/wars: Korean War

Winton "Wint" Allen Winter, Sr. (August 23, 1930 – May 4, 2013) was an American politician who served as a Republican member of the Kansas Senate, attorney, businessman, rancher and athlete. Winter earned both a BA (1952) and JD (1956) at the University of Kansas. He also played football there. He married Nancy Morsbach, and the couple had five children. He served in the United States Marine Corps as a captain in Korea. He first practiced law in Ottawa, Kansas in private practice and as a District Court judge. He served as Chairman of the Young Lawyers Division of the American Bar Association. He owned ranches and was also an owner of a significant Pizza Hut franchise. Winter was in the Kansas Senate from 1969 through 1980; his son Winton A. Winter, Jr. also served there. He founded Peoples, Inc. to acquire and hold community banks and served as its chairman until his death. Winter joined the University of Kansas Rugby Football Club as a competitive player at the age of 43 and continued playing with the club continuously through his 70s. He died of complications from Alzheimer's disease at the age of 82 in Lawrence, Kansas.
