= Kansas Department of Labor =

State agency in Kansas, United States

- Great Seal of Kansas

Department overview
- Formed: 1939
- Headquarters: 401 SW Topeka Blvd; Topeka, Kansas 66603
- Department executive: Amber Shultz, Secretary of Labor
- Website: www.dol.ks.gov

The Kansas Department of Labor is a state agency in Kansas that assists in the prevention of economic insecurity through unemployment insurance and workers compensation, by providing a fair and efficient venue to exercise employer and employee rights, and by helping employers promote a safe work environment for their employees.

The agency was founded in 1939, and it is currently headed by Secretary of Labor Amber Shultz.
