= Kansas Insurance Commissioner =

Division of the Kansas State Government

Insurance Commissioner of Kansas
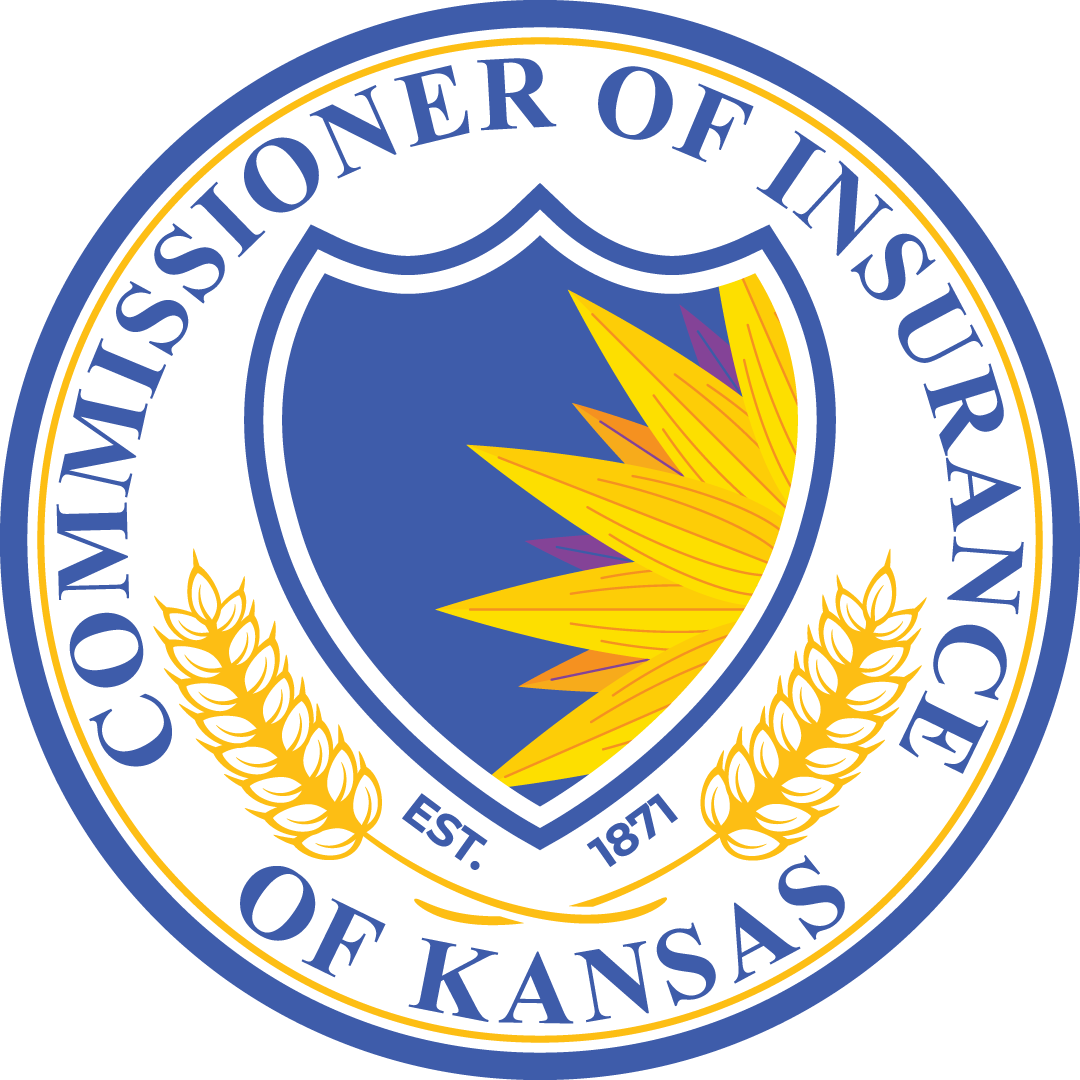

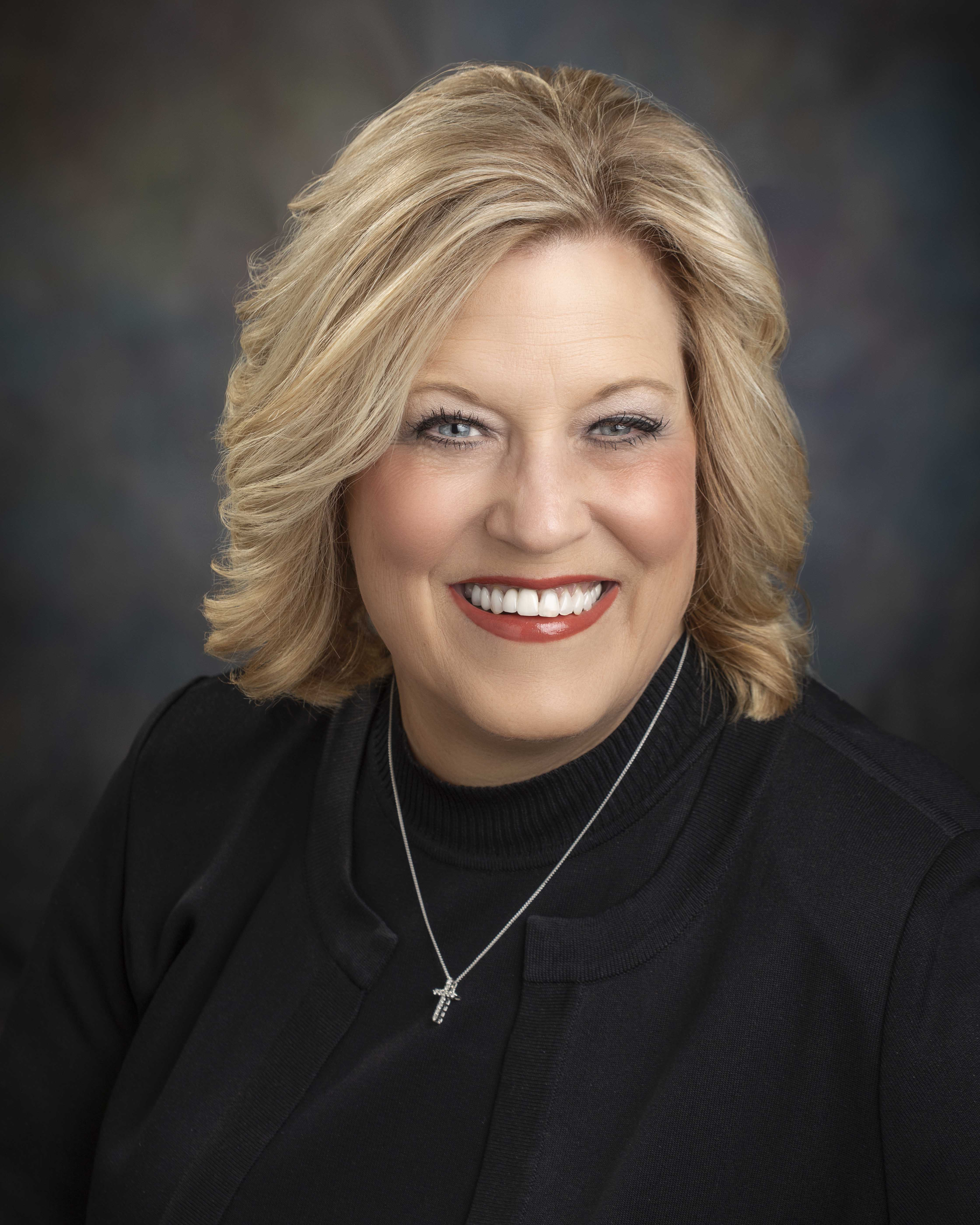
- Incumbent; Vicki Schmidt since January 14, 2019
- Formation: March 1, 1871
- Website: insurance.kansas.gov

The Kansas insurance commissioner (KIC), in full the Kansas state insurance commissioner, has the primary responsibility to the people whose personal lives are protected by insurance in the state of Kansas. It is an elected position and is currently held by Republican Vicki Schmidt.

== Duties ==
The Kansas Insurance Department was established by the Kansas Legislature in 1871. It has four major regulatory functions:

1. Regulate and Review Companies: Sixty-five companies are headquartered in Kansas, plus 1,592 other companies sell policies in Kansas. The Kansas Insurance Department, under the direction of the Commissioner, regulates and reviews these companies to make sure they are solvent and comply with insurance laws and regulations;
2. Educate Consumers: To educate consumers about insurance, the Kansas Insurance Department publishes brochures and rate guides on every type of insurance coverage; provides speakers on numerous insurance topics; and prepares vital public service information to mass media
3. Assist Consumers: The Kansas Insurance Department helps consumers when they have disputes with insurance companies. Such assistance has resulted in millions of dollars in refunds and claims payments for consumers; and
4. License Agents; Approximately 22,000 resident agents and 68,000 nonresident agents are licensed in Kansas to sell insurance products. The Kansas Insurance Department also requires agents to meet ongoing continuing education requirements.

== Officeholders ==
The office was known as the superintendent of insurance until 1927, when the title changed to commissioner of insurance. Since the office's inception, it has primarily been held by the Republican Party, with only 3 office holders not being members of the Republican party. All but 14 years of the office's existence has been with a Republican.

=== Kansas state superintendents of insurance ===
Name	Term	Party
William C. Webb	1871–1873	Republican
Edward Russell	1873–1874	Republican
Harrison Clarkson	1874–1875	Republican
Orrin T. Welch	1875–1883	Republican
Richard B. Morris	1883–1887	Democratic
Daniel W. Wilder	1887–1891	Republican
W. H. McBride	1891–1893	Republican
S. H. Snider	1893–1895	Republican
George T. Anthony	1895–1896	Republican
Alexander P. Riddle	1896–1897	Republican
Webb McNall	1897–1899	Populist
Willard V. Church	1899–1903	Republican
Charles H. Luling	1903–1907	Republican
Charles W. Barnes	1907–1911	Republican
Isaac S. Lewis	1911–1915	Republican
Carey J. Wilson	1915–1919	Republican
Frank L. Travis	1919–1923	Republican
William R. Baker	1923–1927	Republican

=== Kansas state commissioners of insurance ===
Name	Term	Party
William R. Baker	1927–1929	Republican
Charles F. Hobbs	1929–1947	Republican
Frank Sullivan	1947–1971	Republican
Fletcher Bell	1971–1991	Republican
Ronald L. Todd	1991–1995	Republican
Kathleen Sebelius	1995–2003	Democratic
Sandy Praeger	2003–2015	Republican
Ken Selzer	2015–2019	Republican
Vicki Schmidt	2019–present	Republican
