= Kansas's 2nd Senate district =

American legislative district

Kansas's 2nd State Senate district
Senator
Marci Francisco; D–Lawrence
- Demographics: 83% White; 3% Black; 5% Hispanic; 5% Asian; 1% Native American; 3% Other
- Population (2018): 86,298

Kansas's 2nd Senate district is one of 40 districts in the Kansas Senate. It has been represented by Democrat Marci Francisco since 2005.

== Geography ==
District 2 is based in Lawrence, covering the University of Kansas and much of the city's downtown in Douglas County, as well as most of Jefferson County to the north.

The district is located entirely within Kansas's 2nd congressional district, and overlaps with the 10th, 44th, 45th, 46th, and 47th districts of the Kansas House of Representatives.

== Recent election results ==
=== 2020 ===
2020 Kansas Senate election, District 2
Party	Candidate	Votes	%
Democratic	Marci Francisco (incumbent)	33,648	100
Total votes		33,648	100
Democratic hold			

=== 2016 ===
2016 Kansas Senate election, District 2
Party	Candidate	Votes	%
Democratic	Marci Francisco (incumbent)	24,147	66.1
Republican	Meredith Richey	12,378	33.9
Total votes		36,525	100
Democratic hold			

=== 2012 ===
2012 Kansas Senate election, District 2
Primary election
Party	Candidate	Votes	%
Republican	Roland Ellis	2,588	63.4
Republican	Jeremy Pierce	1,493	36.6
Total votes		4,081	100
General election
Democratic	Marci Francisco (incumbent)	21,843	64.5
Republican	Roland Ellis	11,996	35.5
Total votes		33,839	100
Democratic hold			

=== Federal and statewide results ===
Year	Office	Results
2020	President	Biden 67.1 – 30.6%
2018	Governor	Kelly 72.9 – 21.5%
2016	President	Clinton 61.3 – 31.3%
2012	President	Obama 60.1 – 37.4%
