= 2018 United States House of Representatives elections in Kansas =

- November 6, 2018

All 4 Kansas seats to the United States House of Representatives
	Majority party	Minority party
Party	Republican	Democratic
Last election	4	0
Seats won	3	1
Seat change	▼1	▲1
Popular vote	549,563	447,134
Percentage	53.95%	43.89%
Swing	▼5.20%	▲16.83%

Republican
40–50%
50–60%
60–70%
70–80%
80–90%
>90%
Democratic
50–60%
60–70%
70–80%

The 2018 United States House of Representatives elections in Kansas were held on November 6, 2018, to elect the four U.S. representatives from the state of Kansas, one from each of the state's four congressional districts.

The state congressional delegation changed from a 4–0 Republican majority to a 3–1 Republican majority, the first time the Democrats had won a house seat in the state since 2008.

== Overview ==
Results of the 2018 United States House of Representatives elections in Kansas by district:

District	Republican		Democratic		Others		Total		Result
District	Votes	%	Votes	%	Votes	%	Votes	%	Result
District 1	153,082	68.15%	71,558	31.85%	0	0.00%	224,640	100%	Republican hold
District 2	126,098	47.64%	123,859	46.79%	14,731	5.57%	264,688	100%	Republican hold
District 3	139,762	43.91%	170,518	53.57%	8,021	2.52%	318,301	100%	Democratic gain
District 4	144,248	59.44%	98,445	40.56%	0	0.00%	242,693	100%	Republican hold
Total	563,190	53.62%	464,380	44.21%	22,752	2.17%	1,050,322	100%	

Popular vote
Republican	53.62%
Democratic	44.21%
Other	2.17%

House seats
Republican	75%
Democratic	25%

== District 1 ==
2018 Kansas's 1st congressional district election
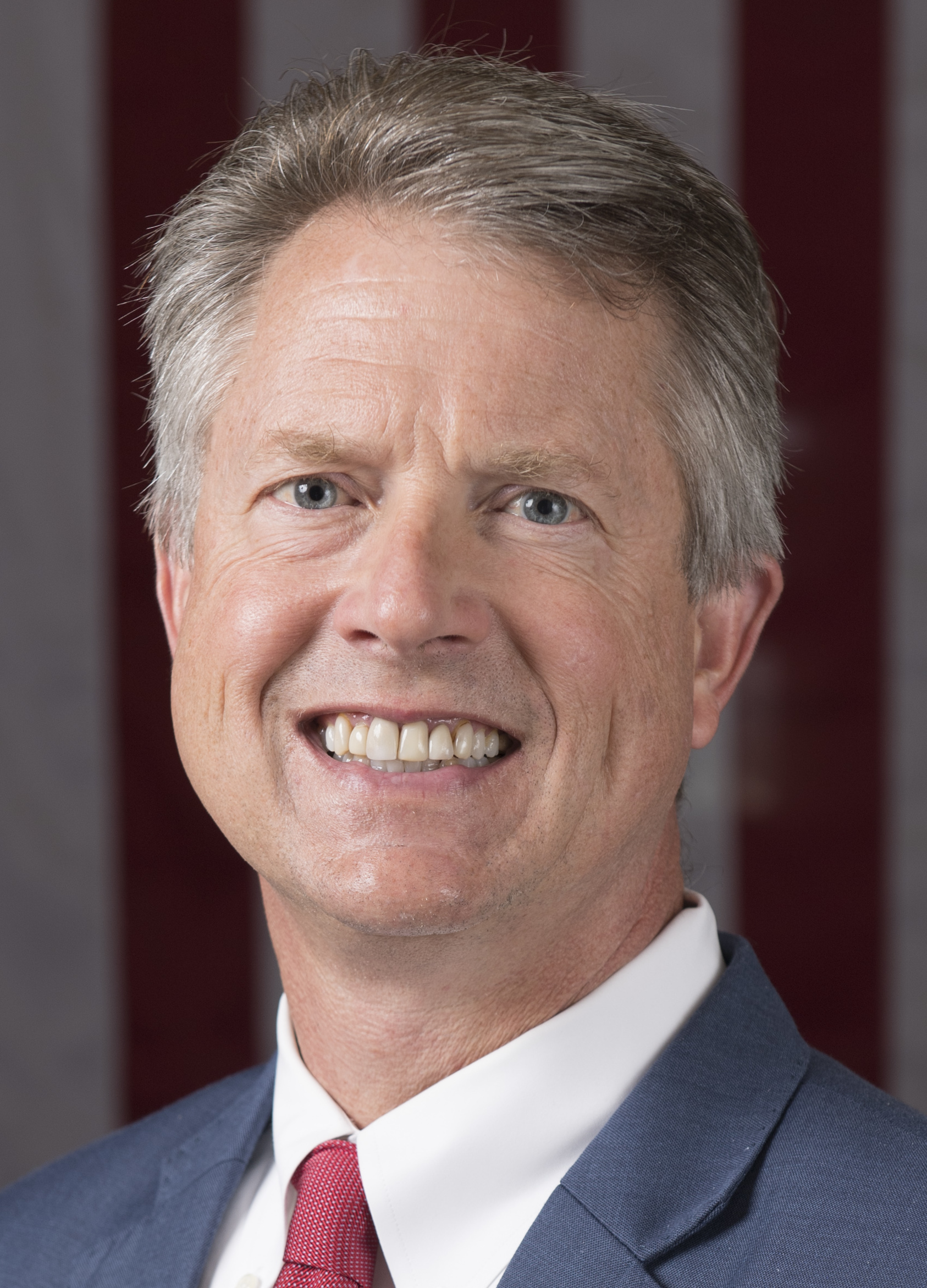

Nominee	Roger Marshall	Alan LaPolice
Party	Republican	Democratic
Popular vote	153,082	71,558
Percentage	68.1%	31.9%
- County results Marshall: 50–60% 60–70% 70–80% 80–90% >90% LaPolice: 50–60%
U.S. Representative before election
Roger Marshall
Republican
Elected U.S. Representative
Roger Marshall
Republican

The first district is one of the largest geographically in the nation, encompassing more than half of the area of the state. It is located in western and northern Kansas, and includes the cities of Manhattan and Salina. Republican Roger Marshall won this district in 2016 by defeating the incumbent congressman, Tim Huelskamp, in the Republican primary 57% to 43% and winning the general election.

=== Republican primary ===
Tim Huelskamp filed a statement of candidacy with the FEC on October 17, 2016, to run for this seat in 2018. Huelskamp made no announcement about whether he was considering a potential rematch with Marshall, but sent a fundraising email attacking Marshall and soliciting donations. On June 29, 2017, it was announced that Huelskamp had accepted a position with The Heartland Institute, a conservative think tank in Arlington Heights, Illinois.

==== Candidates ====
===== Nominee =====
- Roger Marshall, incumbent U.S. representative

===== Eliminated in primary =====
- Nick Reinecker

===== Declined =====
- Tim Huelskamp, former U.S. representative

==== Primary results ====
Republican primary results
Party	Candidate	Votes	%
Republican	Roger Marshall (incumbent)	64,843	78.7
Republican	Nick Reinecker	17,593	21.3
Total votes		82,436	100.0

=== Democratic primary ===
==== Candidates ====
===== Nominee =====
- Alan LaPolice, former school administrator, Republican candidate for this seat in 2014 and an independent candidate in 2016

==== Primary results ====
Democratic primary results
Party	Candidate	Votes	%
Democratic	Alan LaPolice	17,195	100.0
Total votes		17,195	100.0

=== General election ===
==== Predictions ====
Source	Ranking	As of
The Cook Political Report	Safe R	November 5, 2018
Inside Elections	Safe R	November 5, 2018
Sabato's Crystal Ball	Safe R	November 5, 2018
RCP	Safe R	November 5, 2018
Daily Kos	Safe R	November 5, 2018
538	Safe R	November 7, 2018
CNN	Safe R	October 31, 2018
Politico	Safe R	November 4, 2018

==== Endorsements ====
Alan LaPolice (D)

Labor unions

- AFL-CIO

==== Polling ====
Poll source	Date(s) administered	Sample size	Margin of error	Roger Marshall (R)	Alan LaPolice (D)	Undecided
Emerson College	October 26–28, 2018	221	± 6.6%	51%	36%	13%
Jayhawk Consulting (D-LaPolice)	October 22–23, 2018	600	± 4.2%	42%	38%	20%
Remington (R-Marshall)	October 8–9, 2018	1,432	± 2.6%	60%	26%	14%
Emerson College	September 26–28, 2018	193	± 6.8%	44%	17%	35%
Jayhawk Consulting (D-LaPolice)	September 21–22, 2018	400	± 4.9%	44%	33%	23%

==== Results ====
Kansas's 1st congressional district, 2018
Party	Candidate	Votes	%
Republican	Roger Marshall (incumbent)	153,082	68.1
Democratic	Alan LaPolice	71,558	31.9
Total votes		224,640	100.0
Republican hold			

== District 2 ==
2018 Kansas's 2nd congressional district election
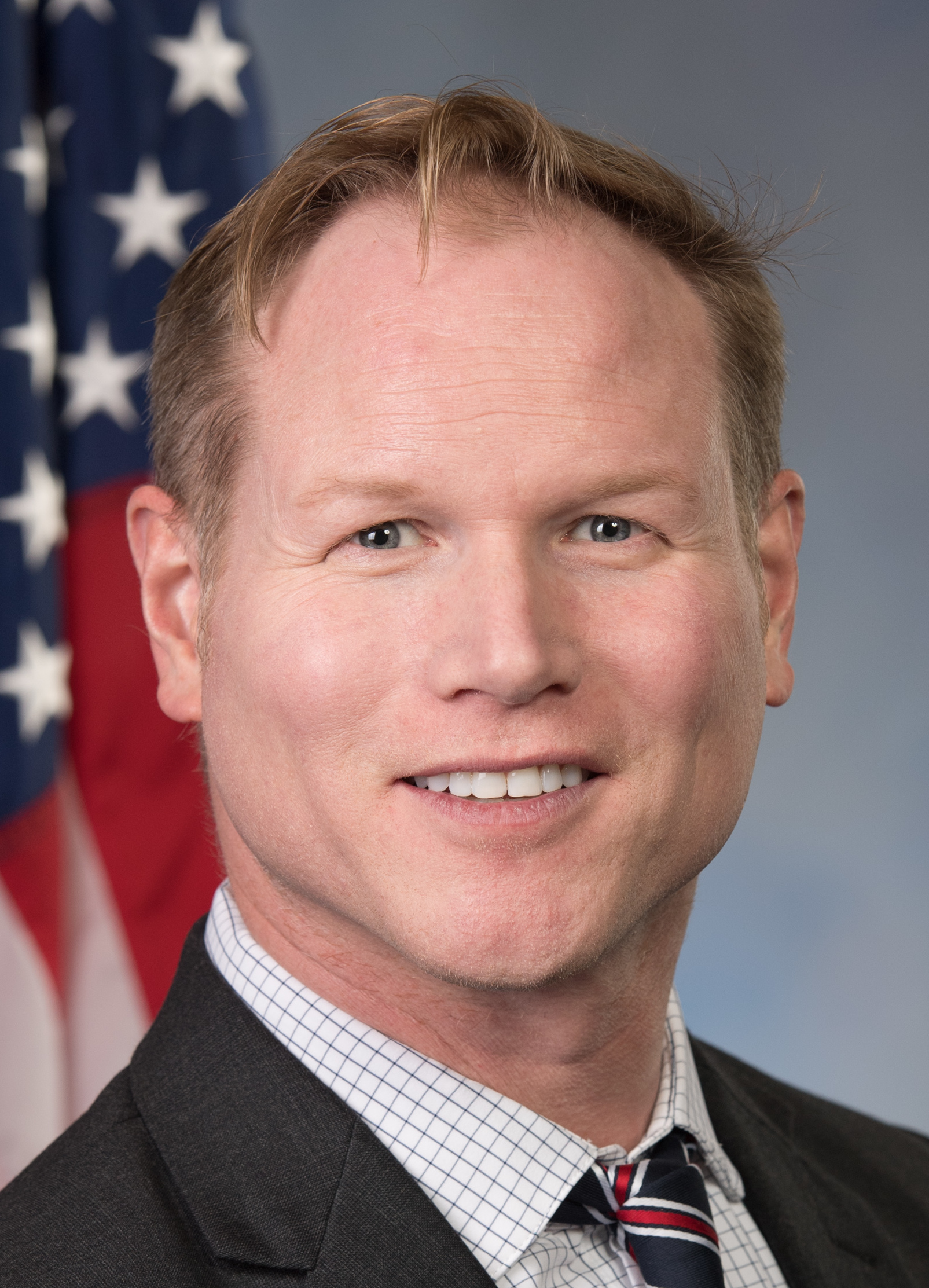

Nominee	Steve Watkins	Paul Davis	Kelly Standley
Party	Republican	Democratic	Libertarian
Popular vote	126,098	123,859	14,731
Percentage	47.6%	46.8%	5.6%
- County results Watkins: 40–50% 50–60% 60–70% 70–80% Davis: 50–60% 70–80%
U.S. Representative before election
Lynn Jenkins
Republican
Elected U.S. Representative
Steve Watkins
Republican

This district is located in eastern Kansas and is anchored by the state capital, Topeka. It also includes the city of Lawrence. Incumbent Republican Lynn Jenkins had represented the district since 2009. In 2008, Jenkins defeated former six-term District congressman Jim Ryun in the primary, and incumbent Democrat Nancy Boyda in the general election. Jenkins was re-elected with 61% of the vote in 2016.

=== Republican primary ===
==== Campaign ====
Jenkins had considered running for governor instead of re-election, but decided to retire and not run for any office in 2018.

Army veteran Steve Watkins led the Republican primary campaign, securing the endorsement of President Donald Trump. However, his background and residency were challenged by fellow Republicans, citing inaccuracies in claims on his website and in his campaign, as well as his absence from the district.

==== Candidates ====
===== Nominee =====
- Steve Watkins, Army veteran, dog racer and engineer

===== Eliminated in primary =====
- Vernon Fields, Basehor city councilman
- Steve Fitzgerald, state senator
- Kevin Jones, state representative
- Doug Mays, former Kansas House speaker
- Dennis Pyle, state senator
- Caryn Tyson, state senator

===== Withdrawn =====
- Matt Bevens
- Tyler Tannahill

==== Endorsements ====
Steve Fitzgerald

Organizations

- Kansans for Life
Dennis Pyle

Organizations

- Kansans for Life
Caryn Tyson

Organizations

- Kansans for Life
- Kansas Farm Bureau
- The Madison Project
- Maggie's List
- Susan B. Anthony List
Steve Watkins

U.S. presidents

- Donald Trump, 45th president of the United States

U.S. representatives

- Roger Marshall, US representative (KS-01)

Organizations

- With Honor

==== Primary results ====
Results by county: Watkins: 20–30%; 30–40%; Tyson: 20–30%; 30–40%; 40–50%; 50–60%; Fitzgerald: 40–50%; Pyle: 30–40%; 40–50%

Republican primary results
Party	Candidate	Votes	%
Republican	Steve Watkins	20,052	26.5
Republican	Caryn Tyson	17,749	23.5
Republican	Kevin Jones	11,201	14.8
Republican	Steve Fitzgerald	9,227	12.2
Republican	Dennis Pyle	9,126	12.1
Republican	Doug Mays	6,221	8.2
Republican	Vernon J. Fields	1,987	2.6
Total votes		75,563	100.0

=== Democratic primary ===
Former Kansas State House Minority Leader and 2014 gubernatorial nominee Paul Davis ran unopposed. When Davis ran against incumbent governor Sam Brownback in 2014, he had carried the 2nd district.

==== Candidates ====
===== Nominee =====
- Paul Davis, former Minority Leader of the Kansas House of Representatives and nominee for governor in 2014

===== Withdrawn =====
- Nathan Schmidt

==== Primary results ====
Democratic primary results
Party	Candidate	Votes	%
Democratic	Paul Davis	38,846	100.0
Total votes		38,846	100.0

=== Libertarian primary ===
==== Candidates ====
===== Nominee =====
- Kelly Standley, business developer

=== General election ===
==== Endorsements ====
Steve Watkins (R)

U.S. presidents

- Donald Trump, 45th president of the United States

U.S. representatives

- Roger Marshall, US representative (KS-01)

Organizations

- With Honor
Paul Davis (D)

Labor unions

- AFL-CIO

Organizations

- Democratic Congressional Campaign Committee "Red to Blue" Program

Newspapers

- The Kansas City Star

==== Debate ====
2018 Kansas's 2nd congressional district debate
No.	Date	Host	Moderator	Link	Republican	Democratic
Key: P Participant A Absent N Not invited I Invited W Withdrawn						
Key: P Participant A Absent N Not invited I Invited W Withdrawn					Steve Watkins	Paul Davis
1	Oct. 18, 2018	WIBW-TV	Melissa Brunner; Ralph Hipp; Shawn Wheat	C-SPAN	P	P

==== Polling ====
Poll source	Date(s) administered	Sample size	Margin of error	Steve Watkins (R)	Paul Davis (D)	Kelly Standley (L)	Other	Undecided
NYT Upshot/Siena College	October 27–30, 2018	501	± 4.8%	37%	41%	7%	–	15%
Change Research (D)	October 27–29, 2018	902	–	45%	44%	–	–	–
Emerson College	October 26–28, 2018	231	± 6.5%	48%	41%	–	–	8%
Emerson College	September 26–28, 2018	243	± 6.4%	31%	35%	4%	3%	28%
NYT Upshot/Siena College	September 13–15, 2018	500	± 4.8%	44%	45%	–	–	12%

Hypothetical polling

Poll source	Date(s) administered	Sample size	Margin of error	Paul Davis (D)	Steve Fitzgerald (R)	Other	Undecided
The Mellman Group (D)	June 13–18, 2018	600	± 4.0%	39%	34%	–	27%

Poll source	Date(s) administered	Sample size	Margin of error	Generic Republican	Paul Davis (D)	Other	Undecided
Public Policy Polling (D)	February 12–13, 2018	711	± 3.7%	42%	44%	–	14%

==== Predictions ====
Source	Ranking	As of
The Cook Political Report	Tossup	November 5, 2018
Inside Elections	Tossup	November 5, 2018
Sabato's Crystal Ball	Lean D (flip)	November 5, 2018
RCP	Tossup	November 5, 2018
Daily Kos	Tossup	November 5, 2018
538	Lean D (flip)	November 7, 2018

==== Results ====
Kansas's 2nd congressional district, 2018
Party	Candidate	Votes	%
Republican	Steve Watkins	126,098	47.6
Democratic	Paul Davis	123,859	46.8
Libertarian	Kelly Standley	14,731	5.6
Total votes		264,688	100.0
Republican hold			

== District 3 ==
2018 Kansas's 3rd congressional district election
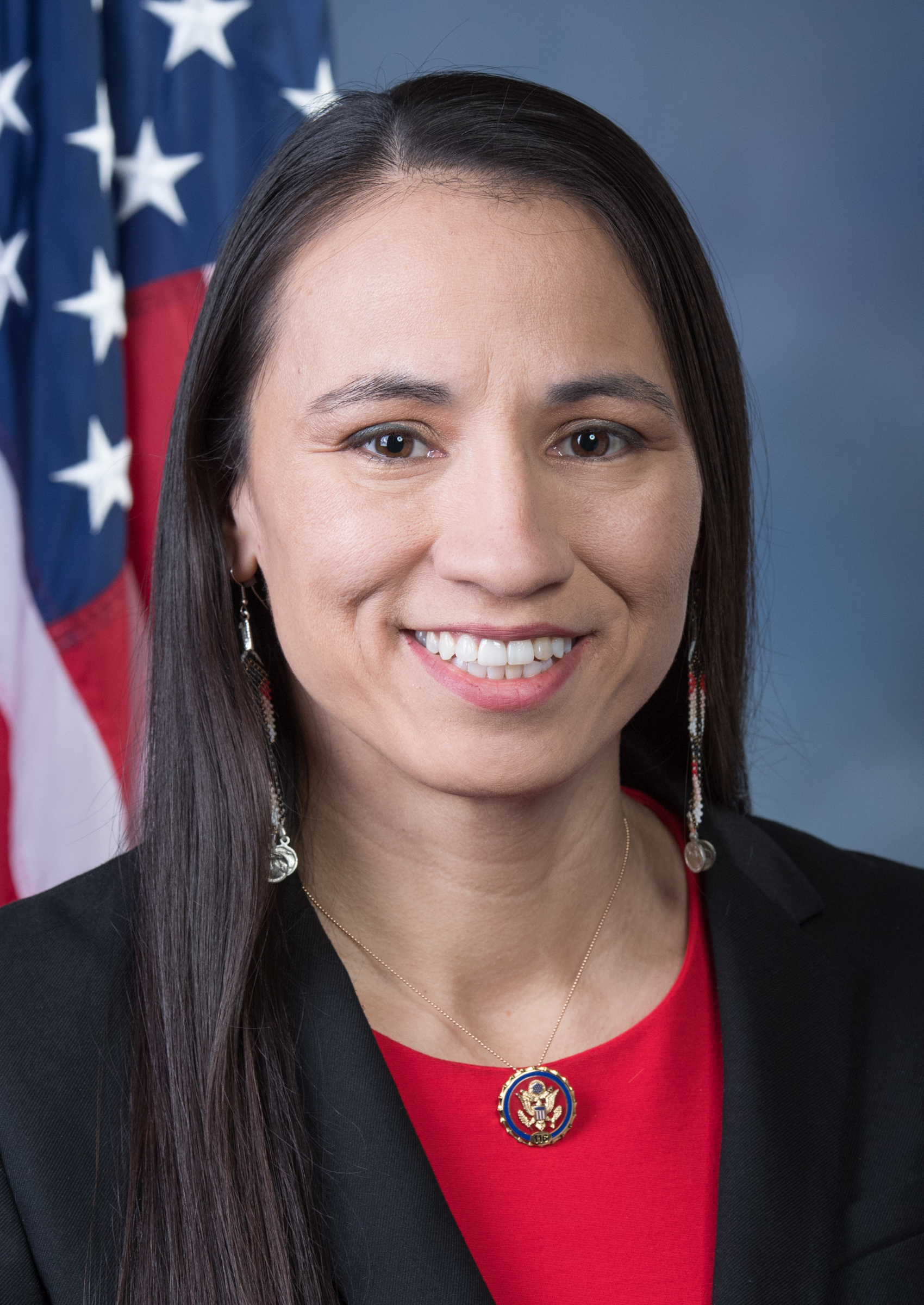

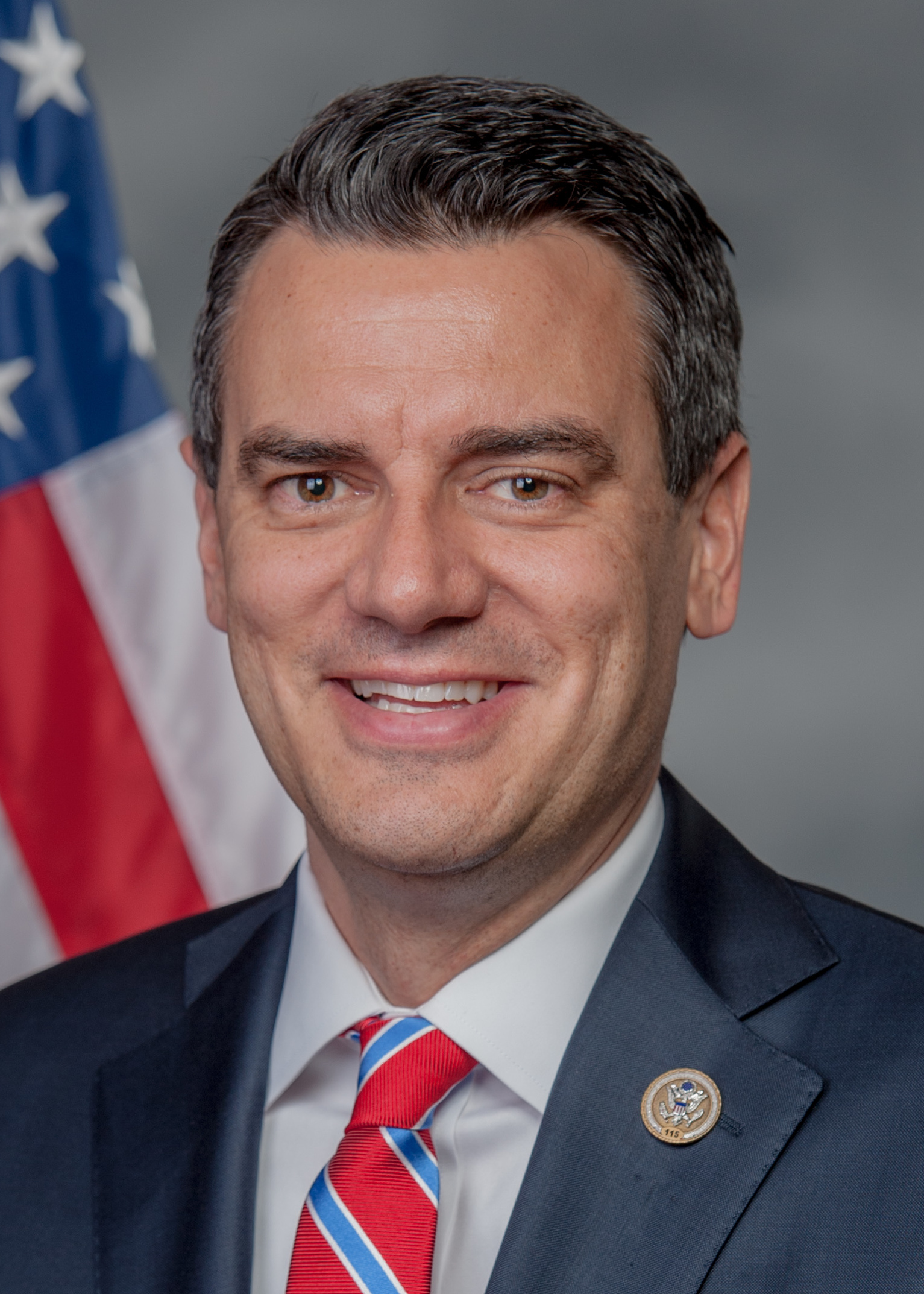
Nominee	Sharice Davids	Kevin Yoder
Party	Democratic	Republican
Popular vote	170,518	139,762
Percentage	53.6%	43.9%
- County results Davids: 50–60% 60–70% Yoder: 60–70%
U.S. Representative before election
Kevin Yoder
Republican
Elected U.S. Representative
Sharice Davids
Democratic

The district is based in the Kansas City metropolitan area and surrounding suburbs in eastern Kansas. Cities include Kansas City and Overland Park. Incumbent Republican Kevin Yoder had represented the district since 2011. Yoder was re-elected with 51% of the vote in 2016. Yoder lost to his Democratic challenger, attorney Sharice Davids, who became one of the first Native American women ever elected to Congress.

=== Republican primary ===
==== Candidates ====
===== Nominee =====
- Kevin Yoder, incumbent representative

===== Eliminated in primary =====
- Trevor Keegan
- Joe Myers

==== Primary results ====
Republican primary results
Party	Candidate	Votes	%
Republican	Kevin Yoder (incumbent)	53,130	68.1
Republican	Trevor Keegan	14,574	18.7
Republican	Joe Myers	10,268	13.2
Total votes		77,972	100.0

=== Democratic primary ===
==== Candidates ====
===== Nominee =====
- Sharice Davids, attorney, mixed martial artist, and former White House Fellow

===== Eliminated in primary =====
- Mike McCamon, businessman
- Tom Niermann, teacher
- Jay Sidie, financial counselor and nominee for this seat in 2016
- Brent Welder, attorney
- Sylvia Williams, former financial services manager

===== Withdrawn =====
- Chris Haulmark (dropped out to run for the Kansas House of Representatives)
- Reggie Marselus, retired union official and candidate for this seat in 2014 & 2016
- Joe McConnell, businessman and Iraq War veteran
- Andrea Ramsey, attorney and former healthcare executive

==== Endorsements ====
Sharice Davids

U.S. representatives

- Raul Ruiz, US representative (D-CA-25)

Labor unions

- AFL-CIO

Organizations

- Congressional Hispanic Caucus
- EMILY's List
- Equality Kansas
- Gay & Lesbian Victory Fund
- LPAC
- Run with Pride

Newspapers

- The Kansas City Star

Local officials

- Sollie Flora, Mission city councilmember
- Chad Herring, Prairie Village city councilmember
- Mike Kelly, mayor of Roeland Park
- Jori Nelson, Prairie Village city councilmember
- Heather Ousley, Shawnee Mission School District School Board at-large member
- Tucker Poling, Prairie Village city councilmember
Tom Niermann

U.S. representatives

- Jim Slattery, former congressman (D-KS-2)

State legislators

- Barbara Bollier, state senator (R-7)
- Cindy Neighbor, state representative (D-18)
- Brett Parker, state representative (D-29)

Labor unions

- United Brotherhood of Carpenters and Joiners of America St. Louis-Kansas City Regional Council
- United Transportation Union (SMART-TD KS)

Organizations

- Mainstream Coalition

Local officials

- Kay Barnes, former mayor of Kansas City, MO
- Al Frisby, city councilman - Merriam
- Logan Heley, city councilman - Overland Park
- Jen Hill, city councilwoman - Roeland Park
- Carol Marinovich, former mayor of Kansas City, KS
- Andrew Osman, city councilman - Leawood
- Hillary Parker Thomas, city councilwoman - Mission
Brent Welder

U.S. senators

- Bernie Sanders, United States senator (I-VT)

U.S. representatives

- Bruce Braley, former congressmen (D-IA-1)
- Ro Khanna, US representative (D-CA-17)
- Patrick Murphy, former congressman (D-FL-18)
- Mark Pocan, US representative (D-WI-2)
- Jamie Raskin, US representative (D-MD-8)

Statewide officials

- Jason Kander, former Missouri Secretary of State, founder of Let America Vote, candidate for mayor of Kansas City in 2019, and host of Majority 54

Labor unions

- Brotherhood of Locomotive Engineers and Trainmen
- Brotherhood of Maintenance of Way Employees
- International Association of Bridge, Structural, Ornamental and Reinforcing Iron Workers Local 10
- International Association of Sheet Metal, Air, Rail and Transportation Workers-Transportation Division
- International Brotherhood of Boilermakers
- International Brotherhood of Teamsters Joint Council 56
- International Union of Bricklayers and Allied Craftworkers Local 15
- International Union of Painters and Allied Trades DC 3
- Laborers' International Union of North America
- National Nurses United
- Service Employees International Union MO/KS State Council

Organizations

- Brand New Congress
- Congressional Progressive Caucus PAC
- Demand Universal Healthcare
- End Citizens United
- Justice Democrats
- Our Revolution
- The People for Bernie Sanders
- Political Revolution
- Progressive Change Campaign Committee

Individuals

- Lee Kinch, former Kansas Democratic Party chairman
- Nathaniel McLaughlin, former Wyandotte County NAACP president, candidate for Kansas Insurance Commissioner
- Killer Mike, rapper and social justice activist
- Wandra Minor, former Johnson County NAACP president
- Alexandria Ocasio-Cortez, Democratic candidate for NY-14
- Angela Ramsey, former candidate for this seat
- Alvin Sykes, civil rights activist
- Cenk Uygur, journalist, activist, founder of Justice Democrats
- Cornel West, author, academic, activist and honorary chair of the Democratic Socialists of America
- Shailene Woodley, actress and activist

==== Polling ====
Poll source	Date(s) administered	Sample size	Margin of error	Sharice Davids	Tom Niermann	Brent Welder	Other	Undecided
Public Policy Polling (D)	August 2–3, 2018	543	± 4.2%	21%	15%	35%	12%	17%

==== Primary results ====
Democratic primary results
Party	Candidate	Votes	%
Democratic	Sharice Davids	23,379	37.3
Democratic	Brent Welder	21,190	33.9
Democratic	Tom Niermann	8,939	14.3
Democratic	Mike McCamon	4,354	6.9
Democratic	Sylvia Williams	2,955	4.7
Democratic	Jay Sidie	1,790	2.9
Total votes		62,607	100.0

=== General election ===
==== Endorsements ====
Kevin Yoder (R)

Federal officials

- Mike Pence, vice president of the United States
- Donald Trump, president of the United States

Organizations

- National Republican Congressional Committee "Patriot" Program
Sharice Davids (D)

Federal officials

- Joe Biden, former vice president of the United States
- Barack Obama, 44th president of the United States
- Kathleen Sebelius, former governor of Kansas and former United States Secretary of Health and Human Services

U.S. representatives

- Raul Ruiz, US representative (D-CA-25)

State legislators

- Cindy Holscher, state representative
- Laura Kelly, state senator and 2018 nominee for governor

Labor unions

- AFL-CIO

Organizations

- Congressional Hispanic Caucus
- Democratic Congressional Campaign Committee "Red to Blue" Program
- EMILY's List
- End Citizens United
- Equality Kansas
- Gay & Lesbian Victory Fund
- League of Conservation Voters Action Fund
- LPAC
- Run with Pride

Newspapers

- The Kansas City Star

Local officials

- Sollie Flora, Mission city councilmember
- Chad Herring, Prairie Village city councilmember
- Mike Kelly, mayor of Roeland Park
- Jori Nelson, Prairie Village city councilmember
- Heather Ousley, Shawnee Mission School District School Board at-large member
- Tucker Poling, Prairie Village city councilmember

==== Polling ====
Poll source	Date(s) administered	Sample size	Margin of error	Kevin Yoder (R)	Sharice Davids (D)	Chris Clemmons (L)	Undecided
Emerson College	October 26–28, 2018	262	± 6.3%	43%	55%	–	1%
NYT Upshot/Siena College	October 14–17, 2018	503	± 4.7%	39%	48%	3%	11%
Emerson College	September 26–28, 2018	246	± 6.4%	41%	47%	2%	10%
NYT Upshot/Siena College	September 20–23, 2018	494	± 4.7%	43%	51%	–	6%
Remington Research (R-Yoder)	September 18–20, 2018	610	± 4.0%	43%	40%	–	–
Global Strategy Group (D-Davids)	August 13–15, 2018	400	± 4.9%	43%	46%	4%	7%

Hypothetical polling

Poll source	Date(s) administered	Sample size	Margin of error	Kevin Yoder (R)	Brent Welder (D)	Other	Undecided
Public Policy Polling (D)	February 14–15, 2018	315	± 5.5%	42%	49%	–	9%

==== Predictions ====
Source	Ranking	As of
The Cook Political Report	Lean D (flip)	November 5, 2018
Inside Elections	Lean D (flip)	November 5, 2018
Sabato's Crystal Ball	Lean D (flip)	November 5, 2018
RCP	Lean D (flip)	November 5, 2018
Daily Kos	Lean D (flip)	November 5, 2018
538	Likely D (flip)	November 7, 2018

==== Results ====
Kansas's 3rd congressional district, 2018
Party	Candidate	Votes	%
Democratic	Sharice Davids	170,518	53.6
Republican	Kevin Yoder (incumbent)	139,762	43.9
Libertarian	Chris Clemmons	8,021	2.5
Total votes		318,301	100.0
Democratic gain from Republican			

== District 4 ==
2018 Kansas's 4th congressional district election
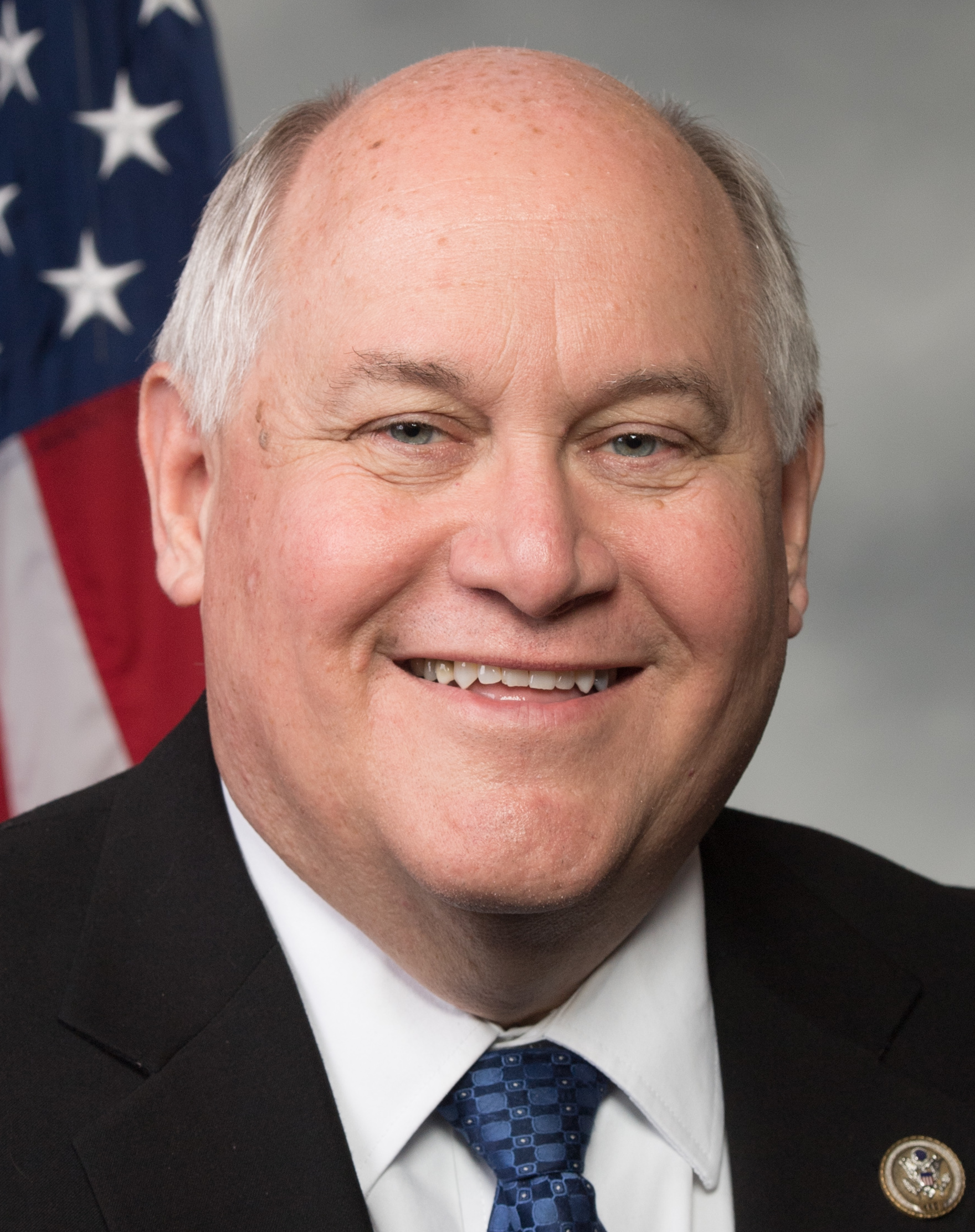
Nominee	Ron Estes	James Thompson
Party	Republican	Democratic
Popular vote	144,248	98,445
Percentage	59.4%	40.6%
- County results Estes: 50–60% 60–70% 70–80% 80–90%
U.S. Representative before election
Ron Estes
Republican
Elected U.S. Representative
Ron Estes
Republican

The fourth district is based in southern Kansas, including Wichita and the surrounding suburbs. Incumbent Republican Ron Estes had represented the district since 2017. Estes was elected with 52.5% of the vote in 2017.

Prior to Estes, Mike Pompeo represented the district. Pompeo had been nominated as Director of the Central Intelligence Agency in the Donald Trump administration. After Pompeo was confirmed, a special election was held for the remainder of Pompeo's term. Ron Estes won the special election on April 11, 2017.

=== Republican primary ===
The Republican Party selected a nominee during a Republican Party primary election which took place on August 7, 2018. The Republican primary was open to registered voters who were either unaffiliated or registered as Republicans.

==== Candidates ====
===== Nominee =====
- Ron Estes, incumbent U.S. representative

===== Eliminated in primary =====
- Ron M. Estes (different candidate with similar name), high level manager at Boeing for 40 years including working on the International Space Station project

===== Declined =====
- Susan Wagle, Kansas Senate president

==== Campaign ====
Because there were two Republican candidates named Ron Estes, the names appeared on the ballot as "Rep. Ron Estes" and "Ron M. Estes", which some criticized as breaking a state law that prohibits identifying an incumbent on the ballot.

==== Primary results ====
Republican primary results
Party	Candidate	Votes	%
Republican	Ron Estes (incumbent)	57,522	81.4
Republican	Ron M. Estes	13,159	18.6
Total votes		70,681	100.0

=== Democratic primary ===
The Democratic Party selected a nominee during a Democratic Party primary election that took place on August 7, 2018. The primary was open to registered voters who were either unaffiliated or registered as Democrats.

==== Candidates ====
===== Nominee =====
- James Thompson, civil rights attorney, military veteran and nominee for this seat in 2017

===== Eliminated in primary =====
- Laura Lombard, businesswoman and CEO of ImEpik (online workforce training services)

==== Campaign ====
Senator Bernie Sanders and Alexandria Ocasio-Cortez campaigned for Democrat James Thompson on July 20, 2018, after the national Democratic party would not support him. Laura Lombard criticized the state's decision to list incumbent Ron Estes as "Rep. Ron Estes" on the ballot, because she believed this broke state laws which prohibit a candidate from being identified as an incumbent on the ballot.

==== Endorsements ====
James Thompson

U.S. senators

- Bernie Sanders, United States senator (I-VT)

Labor unions

- AFL-CIO

Individuals

- Alexandria Ocasio-Cortez, Democratic candidate for NY-14

==== Primary results ====
Democratic primary results
Party	Candidate	Votes	%
Democratic	James Thompson	20,261	65.2
Democratic	Laura Lombard	10,797	34.8
Total votes		31,058	100.0

=== General election ===
==== Predictions ====
Source	Ranking	As of
The Cook Political Report	Safe R	November 5, 2018
Inside Elections	Safe R	November 5, 2018
Sabato's Crystal Ball	Safe R	November 5, 2018
RCP	Safe R	November 5, 2018
Daily Kos	Safe R	November 5, 2018
538	Safe R	November 7, 2018
CNN	Safe R	October 31, 2018
Politico	Safe R	November 4, 2018

==== Endorsements ====
James Thompson (D)

U.S. senators

- Bernie Sanders, United States senator (I-VT)

Labor unions

- AFL-CIO

Individuals

- Alexandria Ocasio-Cortez, Democratic candidate for NY-14

==== Polling ====
Poll source	Date(s) administered	Sample size	Margin of error	Ron Estes (R)	James Thompson (D)	Undecided
Emerson College	October 26–28, 2018	262	± 6.3%	63%	33%	4%
Emerson College	September 26–28, 2018	256	± 6.4%	50%	26%	20%
Change Research (D-Thompson)	July 17–19, 2018	1,896	± 2.25%	42%	38%	20%

==== Debate ====
2018 Kansas's 4th congressional district debate
No.	Date	Host	Moderator	Link	Republican	Democratic
Key: P Participant A Absent N Not invited I Invited W Withdrawn						
Key: P Participant A Absent N Not invited I Invited W Withdrawn					Ron Estes	James Thompson
1	Oct. 5, 2018	PBS Kansas	Susan Peters	YouTube	P	P

==== Results ====
Kansas's 4th congressional district, 2018
Party	Candidate	Votes	%
Republican	Ron Estes (incumbent)	144,248	59.4
Democratic	James Thompson	98,445	40.6
Total votes		242,693	100.0
Republican hold			
