= Doug Walker (politician) =

American politician

Member of the Kansas State Senate from the 12th District
- In office 1989–1996
- Preceded by: Robert Talkington
- Succeeded by: Robert Tyson

Personal details
- Born: January 11, 1952 (age 74) Independence, Kansas
- Party: Democratic
- Spouse: Diana Walker
- Children: 3

Doug Walker (born January 11, 1952) is an American former politician who served for two terms as a Democrat in the Kansas State Senate, from 1989 to 1996.

Walker was born in Independence, Kansas. He worked as a high school teacher in the Osawatomie school system and served on the city council in Osawatomie from 1982 to 1986. He successfully won election to the Kansas Senate in 1988. During his time in the Senate, he served as Democratic Whip, and was the ranking minority member on the Education Committee and Public Health and Welfare Committee. He was succeeded in the Senate by Robert Tyson.

A contributing factor in Walker's defeat in 1996 was his support of rails-to-trails efforts. His support in the Senate helped establish the 51-mile Prairie Spirit Trail that runs between Iola and Ottawa, which was added to the Rail-Trail Hall of Fame in 2011 for "acting as a vanguard for other rail-trail projects," became a Kansas State Park, and was designated as a National Recreational Trail by the U.S. Department of the Interior in October 2020.

Around 2005, Walker became a proponent of and volunteer for the nascent Flint Hills Trail, a long-abandoned and overgrown rail bed running 117 miles between Osawatomie and Herrington. This work included tireless physical labor and leadership roles with the Kanza Rails-Trails Conservancy. Walker's contributions over 15+ years were recognized in 2021 with the establishment of Walker Station at Mile Zero of the trail in Osawatomie. Gov. Laura Kelly acknowledged the efforts of Walker and many others in the Mile Zero ribbon cutting ceremony in October 2021.

After leaving the Senate, he continued working as a teacher through the 2000s, ran a successful custom woodworking shop in Osawatomie, and also renovated the William Mills House, a property listed on the U.S. Register of Historic Places.

In 2016, Walker attempted a return to politics, announcing a run for the Kansas House of Representatives against Republican Kevin Jones. Walker was defeated, taking 41% of the vote to Jones' 59%.
