= Senator Tyson =

Senator Tyson may refer to:

== Members of the United States Senate ==
- Lawrence Tyson (1861–1929), U.S. Senator from Tennessee

== United States state senate members ==
- Caryn Tyson (born 1963), Kansas State Senate
- Gene Tyson (1931–2015), Nebraska State Senate
- Jacob Tyson (1773–1848), New York State Senate
- Robert Tyson (born 1940), Kansas State Senate
