= Bill Wisdom =

Bill Wisdom may refer to:

- Bill Wisdom (Australian rules footballer) (1912-1940), Australian rules footballer
- Bill Wisdom (Kansas politician) (1932-2004), Kansas state legislator
