= John Steineger =

American politician (1924–2012)

Member of the Kansas Senate from the 6th district
- In office 1973–1992
- Preceded by: Wint Winter Sr.
- Succeeded by: Bill Wisdom

Member of the Kansas Senate from the 4th district
- In office 1969–1972
- Preceded by: Louise Porter
- Succeeded by: George D. Bell

Member of the Kansas Senate from the 12th district
- In office 1965–1968
- Preceded by: Paul Lamb
- Succeeded by: Louise Porter

Personal details
- Born: September 13, 1924 Kansas City, Kansas, US
- Died: May 1, 2012
- Party: Democratic
- Spouse: Margaret Ruth Leisy
- Children: 4, including Chris
- Education: University of Kansas (B.A. and J.D.)

John Francis Steineger Jr. (September 13, 1924 – May 1, 2012) was an American politician, diplomat and attorney who spent nearly three decades in the Kansas State Senate, including serving as Senate minority leader from 1976 to 1988.

== Early life ==
Steineger was born on September 13, 1924, in Kansas City, Kansas. He spent a year at the University of Southern California, but his education was interrupted by World War II; he enlisted in the Navy, serving until 1946. He moved back to Kansas to attend the University of Kansas, and married Margaret Ruth Leisy in 1949; the couple eventually had four children, including Chris Steineger, who followed his father into the Kansas State Senate. From 1950 to 1958, John Steineger served in the United States Foreign Service as a cultural attaché in Germany and Iraq. He returned to Kansas and took up the practice of law, working as a Wyandotte County prosecutor in 1960 and founding his own law firm in 1963.

== State Senate ==
Steineger was elected to the State Senate in 1964, taking office in 1965. He was a Democrat and noted for his environmental conservation efforts, receiving a "Conservation Legislator of the Year" award from the Kansas Wildlife Federation in 1974. He was elected as Senate minority leader in 1976 and held the post for 12 years.
