= Richard L. Becker =

American politician (1905–2004)

Member of the Kansas Senate from the 12th district
- In office November 7, 1950 – 1956
- Preceded by: Clarence Oakes
- Succeeded by: Walter Lewis McVey Jr.

Member of the Kansas House of Representatives from the 26th district
- In office 1943–1949

Personal details
- Born: November 3, 1905 Owensboro, Kentucky
- Died: February 18, 2004
- Party: Republican

Richard L. Becker (November 3, 1905 – February 18, 2004) was an American politician who served in the Kansas House of Representatives and Kansas State Senate.

Becker originally served in the Kansas House of Representatives from 1943 to 1949. On November 7, 1950, he was elected to the state senate seat left vacant by the resignation of Clarence Oakes. Becker was re-elected in his own right in 1952 and served for one term before being succeeded by Walter Lewis McVey Jr.
