= Samsel =

Samsel is a surname. Notable people with the surname include:

- Anna-Katharina Samsel (born 1985), German actress
- Mark Samsel (born 1985), American politician
- Ryan Samsel (born 1983–84), political activist

== See also ==
- Mount Samsel, mountain in Antarctica
