= Paul Lamb (politician) =

American politician

Member of the Kansas Senate from the 12th district
- In office 1961–1964
- Preceded by: Walter Lewis McVey Jr.
- Succeeded by: John Steineger

Personal details
- Born: March 22, 1901
- Died: April 1986
- Party: Republican
- Relations: Arnott Lamb (brother)
- Parent: Giles Lamb (father)

Paul Lamb (March 22, 1901–April 1986) was an American politician who served for one term as a Republican in the Kansas State Senate, from 1961 to 1964. He was succeeded by John Steineger.
