= Robert Talkington =

American politician

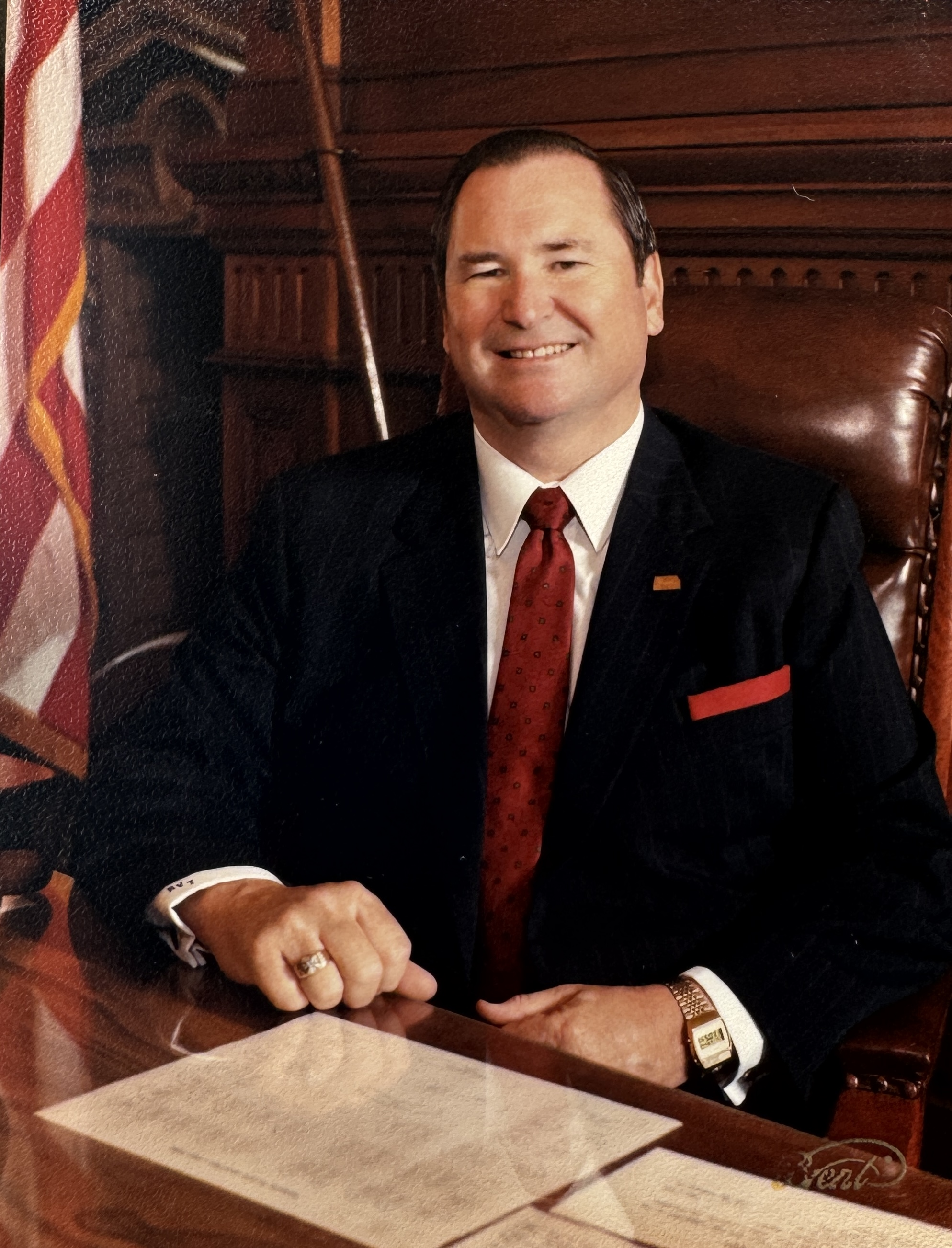

President of the Kansas Senate
- In office 1985–1989
- Preceded by: Ross Doyen
- Succeeded by: Bud Burke

Member of the Kansas State Senate from the 12th District
- In office 1973–1988
- Succeeded by: Doug Walker

Member of the Kansas House of Representatives from the 10th District
- In office 1969–1972

Personal details
- Born: August 23, 1929 Dallas County, Texas
- Died: December 26, 2010 Kansas City, Kansas
- Party: Republican
- Spouse: Donna Jill Schmaus (m. March 25, 1951)
- Children: 7 (2 died in infancy)
- Education: University of Kansas (B.A. and J.D.)

Robert Van Talkington (August 23, 1929–December 26, 2010) was an American politician who served as a Republican in the Kansas State Senate and Kansas House of Representatives from 1969 to 1988.

Talkington was born in Texas, and attended Tyler Junior College before transferring to the University of Kansas on a football and baseball scholarship; he graduated with a bachelor's degree in education in 1951. After gaining his B.A., he entered the University of Kansas School of Law, graduating there in 1954.

Talkington served in the U.S. Army counterintelligence corps during the Korean War. He worked as a lawyer in Iola, Kansas; he was in private practice and also served as the county attorney for Allen County, Kansas as well as city attorney for several nearby towns.

In 1968, Talkington won election to the Kansas House. He served there for two terms, and in 1972 successfully ran for the Kansas Senate. In the Senate, he served four full terms, and was elected President of the Senate for his final term. After his time in the Senate, Talkington was a member of the Kansas Board of Regents from 1996 to 1999. He died of complications from a stroke.
