= Walter L. McVey Jr. =

American politician

Walter Lewis McVey Jr.
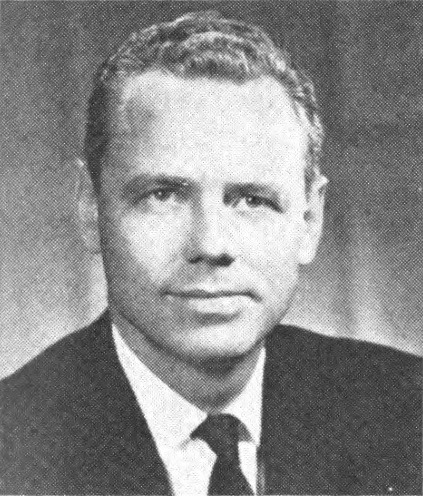

Member of the U.S. House of Representatives from Kansas's 3rd district
- In office January 3, 1961 – January 3, 1963
- Preceded by: Denver D. Hargis
- Succeeded by: Joe Skubitz (redistricting)

Member of the Kansas Senate from the 12th district
- In office January 14, 1957 – January 3, 1961
- Preceded by: Richard L. Becker
- Succeeded by: Paul Lamb

Member of the Kansas House of Representatives from the 27th district
- In office January 10, 1949 – 1952
- Preceded by: Ernest E. Woods
- Succeeded by: T. E. Smith

Personal details
- Born: February 19, 1922 Independence, Kansas, U.S.
- Died: September 10, 2014 (aged 92) Olathe, Kansas, U.S.
- Party: Republican
- Education: University of Kansas

Military service
- Allegiance: United States of America
- Branch/service: United States Army Air Forces
- Years of service: 1943–1946
- Rank: Staff sergeant
- Battles/wars: World War II

Walter Lewis McVey Jr. (February 19, 1922 – September 10, 2014) was a United States representative from Kansas.

Born in Independence, Kansas, McVey was educated in the public schools and graduated from high school in 1940. He attended Independence Junior College for two years and graduated from the University of Kansas with an A.B. in 1947 and a J.D. in 1948. He was admitted to the bar and commenced the practice of law in Independence.

During World War II, McVey served in the United States Army Air Force from 1943 to 1946 and was discharged as a staff sergeant. He served as a member of the Kansas House of Representatives from 1949 until 1952, as judge of the city court of Independence from 1952 until 1956, and as a member of the Kansas Senate from 1957 until 1960. He was an unsuccessful candidate for the Republican nomination for the Eighty-third Congress in 1952.

McVey was elected as a Republican to the Eighty-seventh Congress (January 3, 1961 – January 3, 1963). McVey had an affair with a secretary from his office during the first year of his term, prompting his wife, Rose Mary, to return to Kansas and file for divorce. He was unable to win nomination in 1962 to run for re-election to the Eighty-eighth Congress.

Following his Congressional stint, McVey worked as a management consultant in Washington, D.C. from 1963 until 1964 and as executive director of the Fulton County, Georgia, Republican Party from June 1964 until September 1965. He served as staff counsel to the Georgia Municipal Association from November 1965 until April 1966. He was admitted to the Georgia bar in 1965 and commenced the practice of law in Atlanta.

McVey was a professor of political science at Georgia State University in Atlanta from 1968 until 1980 and at Mercer University in Atlanta from 1971 until 1973. He was also evening dean of DeKalb College in Dunwoody from 1968 until 2001.

McVey was a resident of Olathe, Kansas. He died on September 10, 2014, aged 92.

U.S. House of Representatives
Preceded by Denver D. Hargis	Member of the U.S. House of Representatives from Kansas's 3rd congressional district January 3, 1961 – January 3, 1963	Succeeded by Robert F. Ellsworth
