= Louise Porter =

American politician

Member of the Kansas State Senate from the 12th District
- In office 1969–1970
- Preceded by: John Steineger
- Succeeded by: John Crofoot

Member of the Kansas State Senate from the 4th District
- In office 1965–1968
- Succeeded by: John Steineger

Personal details
- Born: September 19, 1917
- Died: August 24, 1980 (aged 62)
- Party: Republican
- Spouse: Walter Porter

Louise Porter (September 19, 1917 – August 24, 1980) was an American politician who served for five years in the Kansas State Senate. A homemaker and rancher, she took office in 1965, representing the 4th district; in 1969, she switched to representing the 12th district and resigned in 1970, when she was replaced by John Crofoot.

She was married to Walter Porter. She was a Republican. She lived in Miller, Kansas.
