= Clarence Oakes =

American politician

Member of the Kansas Senate from the 12th district
- In office 1949 – November 7, 1950
- Succeeded by: Richard L. Becker

Member of the Kansas Senate from the 12th district
- In office 1941–1941

Member of the Kansas House of Representatives from the 27th district
- In office 1939–1940

Personal details
- Born: June 17, 1900 Merwin, Missouri
- Died: November 15, 1973 Dover Air Force Base, Delaware, US
- Party: Republican

Clarence P. Oakes (June 17, 1900–November 15, 1973) was an American politician who served in the Kansas House of Representatives and Kansas State Senate.

Oakes was born in Merwin, Missouri and his family moved to Kansas when he was five years old. He was elected to the Kansas House in 1938, and served a single term there before being elected to the Kansas Senate in 1940. He resigned his seat in November 1950, and was replaced by Richard L. Becker.

In addition to his time in the state legislature, Oakes served in the U.S. navy, working in military intelligence, and in the U.S. State Department and Central Intelligence Agency. In 1961, he was selected to head the Institute for American Strategy, a defense policy think tank. He led the Institute until his death in 1973.
