= Senator Baumgardner =

Senator Baumgardner may refer to:

- Molly Baumgardner (fl. 2010s), Kansas State Senate
- Randy Baumgardner (born 1956), Colorado State Senate
- Michael Baumgartner (born 1975), Washington State Senate
