= Senator Apple =

Senator Apple may refer to:

- Adam Apple (1831–1905), Wisconsin State Senate
- Pat Apple (born 1957), Kansas State Senate
