= Caryn Tyson =

American politician

Member of the Kansas Senate from the 12th district
- Incumbent
- Assumed office January 14, 2013
- Preceded by: Pat Apple

Member of the Kansas House of Representatives from the 4th district
- In office January 10, 2011 – January 14, 2013
- Preceded by: Shirley Palmer
- Succeeded by: Marty Read

Personal details
- Born: February 15, 1963 (age 63)
- Party: Republican
- Education: St. Mary of the Plains College; Kansas State University (BS); University of Kansas (MS)
- Website: Campaign website

Caryn Tyson (born February 15, 1963) is a Republican member of the Kansas Senate, representing the 12th district since 2013. She succeeded Republican Senator Pat Apple, who chose to run in the newly redistricted 37th district, winning that seat. She was previously a member of the Kansas House of Representatives, representing District 4 from 2011 to 2013. Tyson is a fifth generation Kansan from Parker, Kansas. She earned two Bachelor of Science degrees (Mathematics and Computer Science) from Kansas State University before completing a Master of Science in Engineering Management from the University of Kansas. Before her time in the public sphere, she worked in the IT field for over 24 years. Her work included space shuttle support for NASA.

Tyson was a Republican candidate for Kansas's 2nd congressional district. In a crowded field, she finished a close second to the eventual general election winner, Steve Watkins.

== Kansas Senate ==
Tyson is a Republican member of the Kansas Senate, where she has represented the 12th District since 2013. As a member of the Kansas Senate, Tyson served on a number of committees. She served as the Chair of the Assessment and Taxation Committee.

== Electoral history ==
=== 2018 2nd Congressional District Primary ===
On August 24, 2017, Tyson formally announced her campaign for Kansas's 2nd congressional district. Tyson was endorsed by the Kansas Farm Bureau, Kansans for Life, the Susan B. Anthony List, Maggie's List, and the Madison Project.

Republican KS 2018 CD-2 primary results
Party	Candidate	Votes	%
Republican	Steve Watkins	20,052	26.5
Republican	Caryn Tyson	17,749	23.5
Republican	Kevin Jones	11,201	14.8
Republican	Steve Fitzgerald	9,227	12.2
Republican	Dennis Pyle	9,126	12.1
Republican	Doug Mays	6,221	8.2
Republican	Vernon J. Fields	1,987	2.6
Total votes		75,563	100.0
