= Senator Merrick (disambiguation) =

William Duhurst Merrick (1793–1857) was a U.S. Senator from Maryland from 1838 to 1845. Senator Merrick may also refer to:

- Jake A. Merrick (born 1981/82), Oklahoma State Senate
- Kelly Merrick (born 1975), Alaska State Senate
- Pliny Merrick (1794–1867), Massachusetts State Senate
- Raymond Merrick (born 1939), Kansas State Senate
