= Doug Shane (politician) =

American politician

Member of the Kansas Senate from the 37th district
- Incumbent
- Assumed office January 13, 2025
- Preceded by: Molly Baumgardner

Personal details
- Born: November 7, 1988 (age 37) Kansas City, MO, U.S.
- Party: Republican
- Spouse: Katelin Shane
- Children: 4
- Education: Kansas State University
- Occupation: Veterinarian

Doug Shane is an American politician currently representing the 37th Kansas Senate district as a Republican.

== Biography ==
Doug Shane was born in Kansas City, Missouri, and moved to Kansas as a child. He later relocated to Louisburg, Kansas attending Louisburg High School. During high school, he became involved with the Future Farmers of America (FFA), which contributed to his interest in agriculture.

Shane earned a Bachelor of Science degree in Animal Science and Industry, a Doctor of Veterinary Medicine (D.V.M.), and a Doctor of Philosophy (Ph.D.) in Diagnostic Medicine and Pathobiology, with an emphasis in Production Medicine and Epidemiology, from Kansas State University. He also earned a Graduate Certificate in Applied Biostatistics from the university.

Prior to entering politics, Shane worked in animal health research and higher education, including as a professor at Kansas State University, and served on the USD 416 school board.

== Political career ==
Shane ran to replace Molly Baumgardner in the 37th Kansas Senate district as a Republican. He assumed office January 13, 2025. Following his election to the Kansas Senate, Shane was appointed to the Senate Agriculture and Natural Resources, Education, Government Efficiency, and Judiciary committees.

During his first term in the Kansas Senate, Shane sponsored and co-sponsored legislation focused on government transparency, education, agriculture, wildlife conservation, and public safety. He also amended the state budget to allocate $300,000 for the Kansas School for the Deaf. Among the measures enacted during the 2025 legislative session were Senate Bill 364, which made Kansas’s discounted lifetime hunting and fishing license program for seniors and children permanent and expanded youth eligibility through age 15. Shane sponsored Senate Bill 70, addressing the Kansas Open Records Act and Kansas Open Meetings Act. Although SB 70 did not pass in its original form, several of its provisions were incorporated into House Bill 2134 and enacted into law.

In addition, Shane supported House Bill 2111, which would have established a new classification for certain agritourism businesses, and Doug Shane championed and helped develop SB 339, widely known as the "Recess Bill," whose provisions were later incorporated into HB 2763. Both measures were passed by the Legislature, but were ultimately vetoed by the governor.
