= Robert Tyson =

American politician

Member of the Kansas State Senate from the 12th District
- In office 1997–2004
- Preceded by: Doug Walker
- Succeeded by: Pat Apple

Personal details
- Born: September 29, 1940 (age 86)
- Party: Republican
- Spouse: Linda Tyson
- Children: 2
- Education: Ottawa University

Robert Tyson (born September 29, 1940) is an American former politician who served for two terms in the Kansas State Senate, representing the 12th Senate district from 1997 to 2004.

Born in Ottawa, Kansas, Tyson worked as a rancher in addition to his time in the Senate. He was the chair of Bob Dole's first U.S. Senate campaign in 1968.
