= Steve Watkins =

American politician (born 1976)

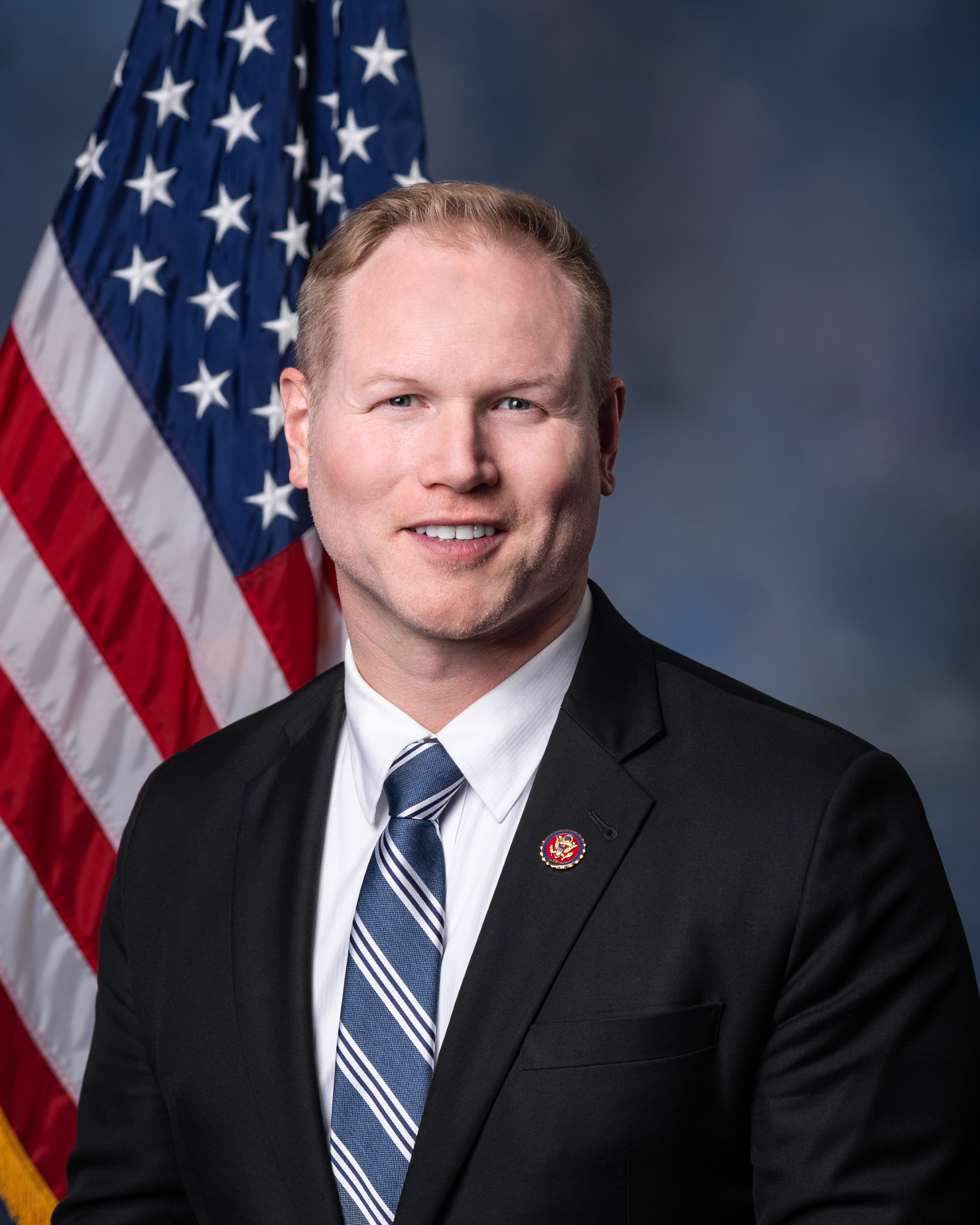
- Official portrait, 2019

Member of the U.S. House of Representatives from Kansas's 2nd district
- In office January 3, 2019 – January 3, 2021
- Preceded by: Lynn Jenkins
- Succeeded by: Jake LaTurner

Personal details
- Born: Steven Charles Watkins Jr. September 18, 1976 (age 50) Lackland Air Force Base, Texas, U.S.
- Party: Republican
- Spouse: Fong Liu
- Education: United States Military Academy (BS); Massachusetts Institute of Technology (MS); Harvard University (MPA)

Steven Charles Watkins Jr. (born September 18, 1976) is an American politician and former military officer. He served as the U.S. representative for Kansas's 2nd congressional district from 2019 to 2021. He is a member of the Republican Party, and was succeeded by Jake LaTurner. He earned degrees from the United States Military Academy at West Point, Massachusetts Institute of Technology (M.I.T.), and Harvard.

== Career ==
Born on September 18, 1976, at Lackland Air Force Base in Texas, Watkins attended high school in Topeka, Kansas and left to attend the United States Military Academy at West Point, New York, graduating in 1999.

Watkins is a graduate of the following military schools: Ranger, Airborne, Sapper, Air Assault, and Pathfinder. He was stationed at Fort Richardson in Alaska in 2000. He saw combat in 2004 in Khost Province and conducted combat patrols on the Afghanistan–Pakistan border, attaining the rank of captain.

He began running dogs in Alaska in 2000, and competed in the Iditarod Trail Sled Dog Race. He finished in 58th place in 2015, ninth from last, and almost four days behind the top three mushers. He did not finish the race in March 2018, having dropped out at Unalakleet, 261 miles (420 km) from the finish in Nome.

Watkins spent five years on active duty with the United States Army. After this, he began working as a defense contractor in Afghanistan, beginning in late 2004. In a 2015 Washington Post interview, he said he had suffered a traumatic brain injury in 2013, and had been diagnosed with post-traumatic stress disorder almost a decade prior. He told reporters his injury was a "tipping point" propelling him in the direction of "a more conventional life".

== U.S. House of Representatives ==
=== Elections ===
==== 2018 ====
Watkins' father, a physician, set up a political action committee (PAC) to underwrite his son's primary campaign. It made two initial $64,000 advertising purchases during the primary. Local Republican Party leaders expressed concerns about Watkins' background. Kansas state Senator Steve Fitzgerald, a primary candidate, noted that Watkins had never voted in Kansas until a recent local election. In July, Donald Trump's 2020 campaign manager, Brad Parscale, stated that Watkins and a second candidate for the seat, Dennis Pyle, had put out campaign ads with Trump's photo on them, without authorization, to imply that they had been endorsed by the president. Watkins was endorsed by U.S. Representative Roger Marshall from Kansas Congressional District 1.

Watkins won the primary with 26.5% of the vote, defeating six other candidates. His family's Super PAC had spent $710,010 supporting his candidacy, and $35,860 opposing Caryn Tyson, the Parscale-endorsed primary candidate who finished second.

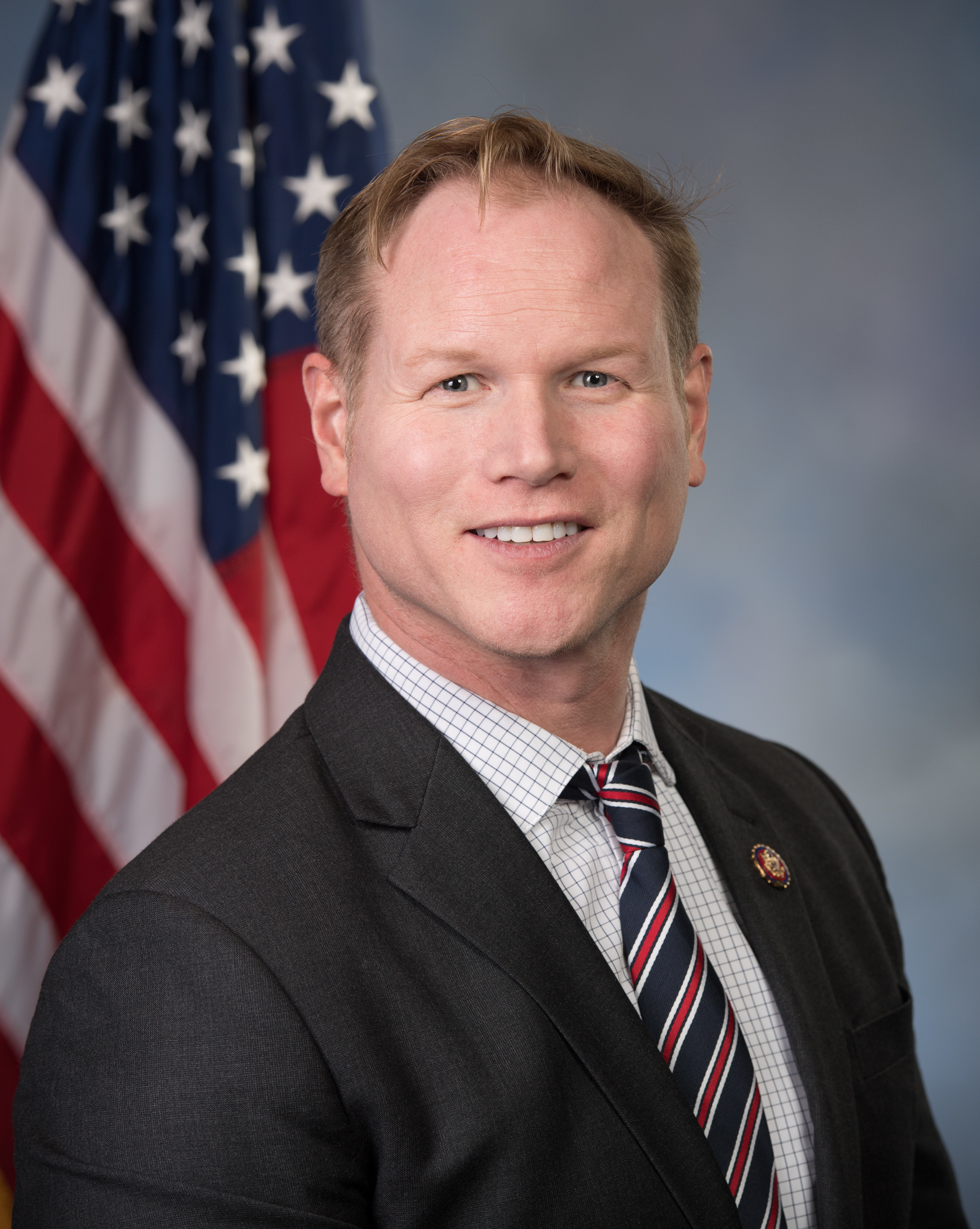
Watkins' first freshman portrait

===== Investigations =====
In October 2018, the Associated Press published a story questioning a number of details of Watkins' claimed background, including a debunked assertion which he had made on his website that he had been praised by outfitter Guy Cotter for his leadership among climbers on Mount Everest after the Nepal earthquake. Cotter claimed that he had never made the statement, and the assertion was removed from Watkins's website after the story was published. A New Zealand Herald story indicated that Watkins was 600 meters above the South Base Camp when the latter was hit by a deadly landslide and avalanche.

Five weeks before the 2018 general election, the Kansas City Star reported that Watkins had claimed to have established a corporation when he had actually only consulted with the corporation long after it had been incorporated. Watkins' campaign described the accusations as "fake news", and Watkins himself called them "baseless opinions from people who don't know me".

Watkins's residence in Kansas was disputed due to his supposed residence in Alaska. Watkins owned two homes in Alaska, but did not own a home in Kansas. Also, he had applied for the Alaska Permanent Fund dividend (a payment to those who say they plan to live in the state indefinitely have maintained residence for one year) 11 times. An open letter signed by local GOP leaders expressing concern regarding Watkins's absence from his district was made public days before the seven-way primary. According to the Associated Press, "public records show the 42-year-old Army veteran hadn’t lived in Kansas since he left high school — nearly two decades before returning to the state last year to run for Congress".

Watkins's 2018 general election campaign against moderate Democrat Paul Davis was described in the U.S. News & World Report as "one of the most negative and competitive congressional races in the country". The candidates debated on October 3, agreeing on a need to protect Social Security, but disagreeing on immigration. Watkins said he was in favor of Trump's proposed border wall, saying, "That doesn't make us mean-spirited or the racist bigots that some leftists would have you believe. It's just common sense." He called for restricting health care spending, but protecting Social Security. On October 6, 2018, President Trump spoke at a rally in Topeka, Kansas in favor of Watkins and gubernatorial candidate Kris Kobach, who later lost. Trump said that voting for Davis "is a vote for the radical agenda" of Nancy Pelosi and Chuck Schumer and "the legendary Maxine Waters," a California congresswoman. The paper wrote that "even a moment's attention from the president was the best thing that could have happened to [Watkins'] campaign."

In October 2018, Chelsea Scarlett, an Alaska resident who had worked on the same military base as Watkins, accused Watkins of making unwanted sexual advances. Scarlett said she did not file a complaint at the time of the incident in 2006 for fear of losing her job. Watkins denied the allegations with the response: "These charges are so preposterous they don't deserve the dignity of a response or publication, but Republicans face this kind of assault from the media every day."

On November 6, 2018, Watkins defeated Davis by 0.8 percentage points, taking all but the two most populous and urbanized counties – Shawnee (home to Topeka) and Douglas (home to Lawrence) – which Davis won by wide margins.

==== 2020 ====
In 2019, Republican leaders searched for a primary opponent to run against Watkins in 2020. Former Kansas Governor Jeff Colyer (R) urged State Treasurer Jake LaTurner to drop his U.S. Senate candidacy and instead run for the District 2 seat. Colyer noted that LaTurner had $470,000 in his campaign treasury, while Watkins, a "vulnerable" candidate, had only $260,000 remaining in his. Watkins stated that the party's misgivings about his candidacy were due to his "outsider" status. After dropping out of the 2020 U.S. Senate race, LaTurner opted to challenge Watkins instead.

On August 4, 2020, Watkins—who had been hit with felony voter fraud charges the previous month—lost the Republican primary to LaTurner. LaTurner went on to defeat Democratic Topeka Mayor Michelle De La Isla in the November 3 general election.

=== Tenure ===
According to a letter filed with the FEC, Watkins forgave $225,100 that he had loaned his campaign in 2018. His personal loans represented much of what he had declared as his wealth that year.

On October 23, 2019, Watkins was one of about thirty House Republicans that intruded upon that day's confidential hearing in a Sensitive Compartmented Information Facility (SCIF) where Republican and Democratic congressional members had been taking testimony from Deputy Assistant Secretary of Defense Laura Cooper. Watkins had permission to enter the secure room as a member of the House Foreign Affairs Committee. "As one of the few Members allowed in Schiff’s secret bunker, I'm proud to support my colleagues who entered the SCIF (sensitive compartmented information facility) today in search of transparency and due process amid Schiff's Kangaroo court," said Watkins. House Homeland Security Committee Chairman Bennie Thompson wrote to the House Sergeant-at-Arms about Jordan and others, requesting that he take action regarding their "unprecedented breach of security". South Carolina Republican Senator Lindsey Graham admonished his House colleagues for their tactic, calling them "nuts" for having made a "run on the SCIF". The disruption delayed Cooper's testimony by many hours.

Between October 1, 2019, and March 31, 2020, Watkins spent $400,000 in taxpayer-funded radio ads and mailed communications to his constituents. That compares to $33,000 spent on franking in the same period by Democratic Representative Sharice Davids in the adjacent Third Congressional District, and the other two Kansas Republican congressmen, $75,000 for Roger Marshall, and $100,000 for Ron Estes in the same period. The total did not include the cost of radio spots that ran frequently in the second quarter of 2020.

In 2020, the FEC reviewed campaign contributions made by Watkins' father and investigated the role the Watkins family's money played in Watkins's election. Watkins Sr. had contributed $765,000 into a PAC funding the 2018 race.

==== Committee assignments ====
Watkins' committee assignments were:

- Foreign Affairs
  - Subcommittee on Middle East, North Africa, and International Terrorism
- Education & Labor
  - Subcommittee on Health, Employment, Labor, and Pensions
  - Subcommittee on Higher Education and Workforce Investment
- Veteran Affairs
  - Subcommittee on Technology Modernization
  - Subcommittee on Disability Assistance and Memorial Affairs

==== Voter fraud case ====
In December 2019, Watkins was accused of voter fraud and election perjury after the Topeka address he listed as his place of residency on his voter registration turned out to be a UPS Store. Shawnee County District Attorney Mike Kagay and county sheriff Brian Hill investigated whether Watkins had broken state law. According to State Rep. Blake Carpenter (R-Derby), "Unless I'm mistaken, no one can live at a UPS store. It cannot be a place of residence. This person undoubtedly voted in an election in November for candidates that he had no constitutional right to vote for. This is wrong and illegal. No one should be above the law."

Watkins' chief of staff denied criticism by stating that the issue as an overreaction to a simple mistake: "He just filed it incorrectly. I think that’s a little ludicrous," while Watkins said they were "very suspicious" and said he looked forward to clearing his name; he added, "This is clearly hyper-political. It comes out moments before our first debate and three weeks before the election. I haven't done anything wrong." Days later, Watkins stepped down from his assigned congressional committees.

On July 14, 2020 moments before the only televised debate, Kagay charged Watkins with "interference with law enforcement, providing false information; voting without being qualified; unlawful advance voting; and failing to notify the DMV of change of address". Three of the alleged offenses were felonies, while the other was a misdemeanor. Watkins is alleged to have voted unlawfully in a November 2019 Topeka City Council race and to have attempted to mislead a sheriff's detective.

In March 2021, Watkins agreed to enter a diversion program and defer prosecution for six months; when he successfully completed the program, the charges were dropped . "I regret the error in my voter registration paperwork that led to these charges", he said. "I fully cooperated from the beginning and had no intent to deceive any one, at any time." In 2021, all charges against Watkins were dismissed.

== Personal ==
Watkins is married to Fong Liu, an obstetrician/gynecologist.

== Electoral history ==
Republican primary results
Party	Candidate	Votes	%
Republican	Steve Watkins	20,052	26.5
Republican	Caryn Tyson	17,749	23.5
Republican	Kevin Jones	11,201	14.8
Republican	Steve Fitzgerald	9,227	12.2
Republican	Dennis Pyle	9,126	12.1
Republican	Doug Mays	6,221	8.2
Republican	Vernon J. Fields	1,987	2.6
Total votes		75,563	100.0

Kansas' 2nd congressional district, 2018
Party	Candidate	Votes	%
Republican	Steve Watkins	126,098	47.6
Democratic	Paul Davis	123,859	46.8
Libertarian	Kelly Standley	14,731	5.6
Total votes		264,688	100.0
Republican hold			

Republican primary results, 2020
Party	Candidate	Votes	%
Republican	Jake LaTurner	46,040	49.1%
Republican	Steve Watkins (incumbent)	31,934	34.1%
Republican	Dennis Taylor	15,772	16.8%
Total votes		93,746	100.0%

== See also ==
- List of Harvard University politicians
- Kansas's congressional delegations

U.S. House of Representatives
Preceded by Lynn Jenkins	Member of the U.S. House of Representatives from Kansas's 2nd congressional district 2019–2021	Succeeded by Jake LaTurner
U.S. order of precedence (ceremonial)
Preceded by Nancy Boyda as Former U.S. Representative	Order of precedence of the United States as Former U.S. Representative	Succeeded by Cleve Benedict as Former U.S. Representative
