= Carrie Barth =

American politician

Member of the Kansas House of Representatives from the 5th district
- In office January 9, 2023 – September 25, 2025
- Preceded by: Mark Samsel
- Succeeded by: Courtney Sappington

Personal details
- Born: 20th century
- Party: Republican
- Spouse: Dallas Barth
- Children: Charlize and Chaney
- Education: Kansas State University (BS)

Carrie Barth (born 20th century) is an American politician who served the 5th district in the Kansas House of Representatives as a Republican, winning the 2022 Kansas House of Representatives election and entering office January 9, 2023 until her resignation on September 25, 2025 due to moving out of the district.

== Biography ==
Barth graduated from Wellsville High School in 1992. She also earned a Bachelor of Science degree in apparel and textile marketing management from Kansas State University in 1996.
