= Michael Peterson (politician) =

American politician

Member of the Kansas House of Representatives from the 32nd district
- In office January 14, 2013 – February 18, 2014
- Preceded by: Louis Ruiz
- Succeeded by: Pam Curtis

Member of the Kansas House of Representatives from the 37th district
- In office January 10, 2005 – January 14, 2013
- Preceded by: Kathleen Reardon
- Succeeded by: Stan Frownfelter

Member of the Kansas House of Representatives from the 33rd district
- In office February 13, 1979 – January 14, 1991
- Preceded by: Joseph Mikesic
- Succeeded by: Richard J. Edlund

Personal details
- Born: September 18, 1941 Kansas City, Kansas, U.S.
- Died: February 18, 2014 (aged 72) Kansas City, Kansas, U.S.
- Party: Democratic
- Spouse: Robin Novak
- Children: 5
- Education: Kansas City School of Law
- Occupation: lawyer

Michael James Peterson (September 18, 1941 – February 18, 2014) was an American Democratic member of the Kansas House of Representatives, representing the 37th district. He served from 1979 until 1990, and then again from 2005 until his death in 2014.

== Career ==
Peterson received his law degree from the University of Missouri–Kansas City School of Law in 1971. He then practiced law.

== Death ==
He died at the age of 72 on February 18, 2014, in a Kansas City-area hospital, following a long illness.

== Committee membership ==
- Federal and State Affairs
- Local Government
- Elections

== Major donors ==
The top 5 donors to Peterson's 2008 campaign:

- 1. Kansas Contractors Assoc $700
- 2. Kansas Trial Lawyers Assoc $500
- 3. Ruffin, Phil $500
- 4. Sunflower Electric Power Corp $500
- 5. Kansans for Lifesaving Cures $500

Kansas House of Representatives
| Preceded by Joseph Mikesic | Member of the Kansas House of Representatives from the 33rd district February 13, 1979 – January 14, 1991 | Succeeded by Richard J. Edlund |

Kansas House of Representatives
| Preceded by Kathleen Reardon | Member of the Kansas House of Representatives from the 37th district January 10, 2005 – January 14, 2013 | Succeeded by Stan Frownfelter |

Kansas House of Representatives
| Preceded by Louis Ruiz | Member of the Kansas House of Representatives from the 32nd district January 14, 2013 – February 18, 2014 | Succeeded by Pam Curtis |
