= Stan Frownfelter =

American politician (born 1951)

Member of the Kansas House of Representatives from the 37th district
- In office January 14, 2013 – January 11, 2021
- Preceded by: Michael Peterson
- Succeeded by: Aaron Coleman

Member of the Kansas House of Representatives from the 31st district
- In office January 3, 2007 – January 14, 2013
- Preceded by: Bonnie Sharp
- Succeeded by: Louis Ruiz

Personal details
- Born: May 12, 1951 (age 75) Herington, Kansas, U.S.
- Party: Democratic
- Education: Emporia State University

Stan S. Frownfelter (born May 12, 1951) is an American businessman and former Democratic member of the Kansas House of Representatives, representing the 37th district in Wyandotte County. He was first elected in 2006 and took office on January 3, 2007. He served as the House Assistant Minority Leader from 2017 to 2019. Until 2020, he had never faced primary opposition.

Frownfelter has a bachelor's degree from Emporia State University. Frownfelter is a member of Sigma Tau Gamma, and joined in 1969 while at Emporia State. In 2019, Frownfelter ran for the Wyandotte County Public Utilities Board and lost. During that campaign, Frownfelter told a debate audience that he would not run for reelection to the Kansas legislature in 2020.

Frownfelter lost the August 4, 2020, Democratic primary election to Aaron Coleman.

Kansas House of Representatives 37th district 2020 Democratic primary
Party	Candidate	Votes	%
Democratic	Aaron Coleman	823	49.8%
Democratic	Stan Frownfelter (incumbent)	809	49.0%
Total votes		1,652	100.00

At the urging of some Democratic state legislators, Frownfelter pursued an unsuccessful write-in campaign for the November General election. Because of the controversy surrounding Aaron Coleman, two other people, Wyandotte County Republican Central Committee Treasurer Kristina Smith, and Keith "T-Bone" Jordan, a DJ for KQRC-FM 98.9, “The Rock" also tried, unsuccessfully for write-in votes.

Kansas House of Representatives 37th district 2020 general election
Party	Candidate	Votes	%
Democratic	Aaron Coleman	3,649	66.45%
Democratic	Stan Frownfelter (write-in)	1,222	22.25%
Republican	Kristina Smith (write-in)	620	11.29%
Total votes		5,491	100.00

As of 2020, Frownfelter's district has 4,928 registered Democrats and 2,155 Republicans, with Libertarians at 99 and 4,036 unaffiliated.

== Committee memberships ==
2019–2020

- Commerce, Labor and Economic Development (ranking minority member)
- Insurance
- Financial Institutions and Pensions
- Energy, Utilities and Telecommunications

2017–2018

- Legislative Budget (House)
- Calendar and Printing
