= Pat Pettey =

American politician (born 1946)

Member of the Kansas Senate from the 6th district
- Incumbent
- Assumed office January 14, 2013
- Preceded by: Chris Steineger

Member of the Kansas House of Representatives from the 31st district
- In office January 11, 1993 – January 13, 1997
- Preceded by: Bill Wisdom
- Succeeded by: Bonnie Sharp

Personal details
- Born: November 28, 1946 (age 79) Junction City, Kansas, U.S.
- Party: Democratic
- Spouse: John (deceased)
- Children: 2
- Education: University of Kansas; Emporia State University

Patricia D. Pettey (born November 28, 1946) is a Democratic member of the Kansas Senate, representing the 6th district in the senate since 2013. Pat Pettey served in the House from 1993 - 1996.
