= Raymond Merrick =

American politician

Ray Merrick

Speaker of the Kansas House of Representatives
- In office January 14, 2013 – January 9, 2017
- Preceded by: Michael O'Neal
- Succeeded by: Ron Ryckman Jr.

Member of the Kansas House of Representatives from the 27th district
- In office January 14, 2013 – January 9, 2017
- Preceded by: Charlotte O'Hara
- Succeeded by: Sean Tarwater
- In office January 10, 2000 – January 10, 2011
- Preceded by: Phyllis Gilmore
- Succeeded by: Charlotte O'Hara

Member of the Kansas Senate from the 37th district
- In office January 10, 2011 – January 14, 2013
- Preceded by: Jeff Colyer
- Succeeded by: Pat Apple

Personal details
- Born: October 18, 1939 (age 86) Smith, Alberta, Canada
- Party: Republican
- Spouse: Phyllis Merrick
- Education: Washburn University

Raymond F. Merrick (born October 18, 1939) is a Republican former member of the Kansas House of Representatives, representing district 27 from 2013 to 2017. He was elected Speaker of the Kansas House of Representatives in December 2012.

== Political career ==
Merrick represented district 37 in the Kansas Senate from 2011 to 2013. Shortly after the 2010 general election, when district 37 Senator Jeff Colyer was elected lieutenant governor, Merrick was elected by Republican precinct committee members to fill the remainder of Colyer's term. After redistricting for the 2012 elections, Merrick filed for House district 27, with the expressed intent of being elected House speaker.

Merrick previously served in the Kansas House from January 6, 2000, to January 2011. He served as House majority leader from 2007 to 2010, as speaker pro tempore from 2004 to 2006, and as assistant majority leader from 2002 to 2004.

== Background ==
After college, Merrick was in the United States Marine Corps for several years and then began a career in sales for Folger's Coffee. He founded and owns MJM Management Company, a property management company for shopping centers in the growing southern suburban Kansas City region. Johnson County, Kansas. He previously served as senior vice president/general manager for both the Myron Green Cafeterias Company and Treat America.

He is married to Phyllis Merrick, lives in Stilwell and holds a business administration degree from Washburn University of Topeka.

== Issue positions ==
Merrick has been described by the state's largest newspaper, The Wichita Eagle, as being from the "conservative faction of the Republican Party."

Merrick's website lists some of his major goals as "tougher restrictions on sexual predators," "protecting Blue Valley and Olathe school districts," and "advocating responsible government and protecting our tax dollars."

As Kansas House Speaker in 2013, he focused House attention on tax and budget matters, cutting both, to the exclusion of most other issues.

== Controversy ==
In a November 2014 interview with the state's largest newspaper, The Wichita Eagle, Merrick stated, "Government workers produce nothing," following it up with further comments to underscore their burden upon society. The remarks stimulated an intense backlash, particularly from government workers representatives and the Kansas Democratic Party (who circulated a petition calling for Merrick's departure from the Speaker's seat). Merrick subsequently mollified the remark with positive comments about public service employees.

== Committee assignments ==
=== 2009–2010 ===
In the 2009–2010 legislative session, Merrick served on these House committees:

- Calendar and Printing, chair
- Interstate Cooperation, vice-chair
- Legislative Budget, vice-chair

=== 2011–2012 ===
In the 2011–2012 legislative session, Merrick served on these Senate committees:

- Commerce
- Financial Institutions and Insurance
- Utilities

=== 2013–2014 ===
At the beginning of the 2013 legislative session, Merrick served on these House committees:

- Interstate Cooperation, chair
- Calendar and Printing, vice-chair
- Legislative Budget

=== 2015 ===
Speaker Merrick currently serves on the following House committees:

- Interstate Cooperation, chair
- Calendar and Printing, vice-chair
- Legislative Coordinating Council, vice-chair
- Legislative Budget

== Elections ==
=== 2008 ===
On November 4, 2008, Merrick was re-elected to the 27th district seat in the Kansas House of Representatives, defeating Becky Ansley (D).

=== 2010 ===
Merrick won re-election to the 27th district seat in the November 2, 2010, general election, with no opposition. He was also unopposed in the GOP primary.

=== 2012 ===
After redistricting for the 2012 elections, Merrick filed for the House 27 seat held Charlotte O'Hara, R-Overland Park. Merrick ran unopposed in the August 7 Republican primary and ran unopposed in the general election, on November 6, 2012. He was elected speaker of the House in a three-way race on December 2, 2012.

O'Hara filed for the Kansas Senate district 37 seat being vacated in 2012 by Merrick. She placed second in a three-way Republican primary. Republican district 37 nominee Pat Apple, the district 12 incumbent, was unopposed in the November 6, 2012, general election.

== Memberships ==
- American Legislative Exchange Council (ALEC), serving as both the Kansas co-chair and on the national board
- Co-founder of Kansas Chapter of the National Association of Sportsman's Caucuses

== Sponsored legislation ==
- SCR 1602 Congratulating Kansas' Sesquicentennial. January 28, 2011 .
- SCR 1604 Constitutional amendment to preserve right to choose health care services and participate in health insurance plans. February 9, 2011 .
- SR 1847 Recognizing April as the Month of the Military Child. April 27, 2011 .
- SR 1851 Supporting the development of 4-H projects in south Johnson County. April 2, 2011.

== Major donors ==
The top five business donors to Merrick's 2010 campaign were all professional organizations and corporations:

- Sprint Nextel: $1,000
- Kansas Medical Society: $1,000
- Kansas Bankers Association: $1,000
- Glaxosmithkline: $1,000
- Koch Industries: $1,000

Preceded by Michael O'Neal	Speaker of the Kansas House of Representatives; January 14, 2013 – January 9, 2017	Succeeded by Ron Ryckman Jr.
