= Chris Steineger =

American politician (born 1962)

Member of the Kansas Senate from the 6th district
- In office January 13, 1997 – January 14, 2013
- Preceded by: Bill Wisdom
- Succeeded by: Pat Pettey

Personal details
- Born: January 8, 1962 (age 64) Kansas City, Kansas, U.S.
- Party: Republican (2010-present)
- Other political affiliations: Democratic (1997-2010)
- Spouse: Shari Wilson
- Parent: John Steineger
- Education: Kansas State University; University of Kansas
- Profession: Consultant & investor

Chris Steineger (born January 8, 1962) is an American politician from Kansas. He represented the 6th district of the Kansas Senate, based in Kansas City, from 1997 until 2013.

He has worked for U.S. Representative Jim Slattery in Washington, D.C., been an assistant in the city administrator's office in Kansas City, and a tax auditor and collector with the Kansas Department of Revenue.

== Early life ==
Steineger was born in Kansas City, Kansas, and grew up in Muncie, a township on the edge of the city limits. His father was former senator Jack Steineger, a veteran of the Kansas Legislature for 28 years. His mother Margaret served on various community boards. Steineger previously served as a board member for Kaw Valley Arts and Humanities Inc., the Mid-America Manufacturing Technology Center, the Kansas Technology Enterprise Corporation and the International Relations Council of Kansas City.

In 2003, he lived for three months in Japan on a Japan Society Fellowship studying Japanese agriculture, food processing, and food marketing. In 2004, Steineger studied European health care systems in Brussels on a Fellowship with the European Union Visitors Program. In 2006, Steineger lectured on American government, politics, elections, and campaigns at the Chinese Foreign Relations University in Beijing. In 2007, he went to Cuba and presented information on American wetlands' policy at the Caribbean Wetlands Symposium. That same year, he studied energy and health care systems in Israel as a Fellow with the American Jewish Committee's Project Interchange.

== International work and studies ==
Steineger has visited more than 50 countries, including China, Japan, Taiwan, Mexico, India, Israel, Cuba, Turkey, Dubai, Oman, and Southeast Asia. He has traveled extensively in West and East Europe, including Germany visits with DAAD and German Chamber of Commerce. In 2003, he studied for three months in Japan on a Japan Society Fellowship studying Japanese agriculture, food processing, and food marketing. In 2004, Steineger studied European health care systems in Brussels on a fellowship with the European Union Visitors Program.

In October 2006, he lectured on American government, politics, elections, and campaigns at Chinese Foreign Relations University in Beijing. In 2007, Steineger visited Cuba and gave a presentation on American wetlands' policy at the Caribbean Wetlands Symposium. He also studied energy and health care systems in Israel as a fellow with the American Jewish Committee's “Project Interchange.” In 2011, he gave 17 lectures in northern Germany forecasting the 2012 US elections.

== Government and politics ==
Steineger worked in all three levels of American government, Federal, State, & Local. During the Reagan years, Steineger worked on Capitol Hill as a Congressional staffer. He worked in the Kansas Dept. of Revenue as an auditor, and in the city managers office in Kansas City, Kansas. He has been an elected senator; agency staffer; and campaign staffer.

He passed many bills and amendments, most notably the casino gaming legislation, in a 10-year effort to build a coalition of business; labor; newspapers; Democrats and Republicans. Steineger was also an advocate for Hollywood Casino at Kansas Speedway. He was an outspoken critic of the State Capitol renovation when it ballooned from a $100 million project into a $350 million project.

== 2010 Secretary of State primary ==
Steineger ran unsuccessfully for Kansas Secretary of State (KSOS) in 2010, losing the Democratic primary to incumbent Chris Biggs, 49,238 60.2%, to 32,518 39.7%. During the campaign, it was revealed that in 2006, Mike Sager, Steineger's Campaign Finance Director, who had previously been fined $9,000 for campaign ethics violations, was indicted for a felony count of stealing $22,500 from his own Missouri campaign and "...a misdemeanor count of filing false campaign finance reports in order to subsequently cover up the theft."

== Party switch ==
After many years as a Democrat, Steineger switched parties and joined the Republican Party in 2010. He self describes as “Libertarian Conservative” and supports policies including a simplified tax code; deregulation of small business; public school choice; privatization & outsourcing of government services; welfare reform. With a libertarian view, he staunchly supports the rights of individuals to make their own choices without interference by politicians or bureaucrats regarding abortion; firearms ownership; smoking; drinking; gambling; marriage; seat belt, and helmet usage.

== Elections ==
Steineger won election to the Kansas Senate in 1996, 2000, 2004, and 2008.

Steineger ran as an incumbent to retain his seat in the 2012 Senate election. The Democratic candidate, Pat Pettey, defeated him by a margin of 62.1%, 11,637 votes to 37.9%, 7,106 votes.

== Community involvement ==
- Grinter Place Friends
- Kaw Valley Arts and Humanities Inc.
- Wyandotte County Historical Society
- Mid-America Manufacturing Technology Center
- Kansas Technology Enterprise Corporation
- International Relations Council of Kansas City

== Post political life ==
In fall semester 2013, Steineger won a Fulbright award and taught graduate and undergraduate classes at Humboldt University in Berlin.

Steineger is now retired from politics and teaches "American government and Contemporary Politics" to foreign audiences. This can be a discussion of the Constitution, Bill of Rights, three tier form of government as is taught in High School Civics class. A new lecture series is titled: “Why & How to Grow a Middle Class” which essentially advocates for: freedom for individuals; open markets; celebration of creativity & innovation; transparent & fair government; and how America has maintained a better balance of State-control vs freedom for the individual and private enterprise, thus leading to prosperity for more.

In 2006, Steineger lectured on American government, politics, elections, and campaigns at the Chinese Foreign Relations University in Beijing. In 2013 with a Fulbright award, Steineger was guest lecturer at Humboldt University in Berlin. In 2016 with a second Fulbright award, Steineger was a guest lecturer at universities in Athens and Thessaloniki, Greece.

American embassies in Berlin, Beijing, Baku, Tbilisi, Yerevan, and Warsaw have sent him on public speaking tours in front of foreign audiences ranging from high school and university students, to government staffers, to business executives, and members of the media. He has lectured at different universities around Germany, including the University of Bonn, the Heidelberg Center for American Studies, Kiel University, the University of the Bundeswehr Munich, the Munich School of Politics and Public Policy, LMU Munich, the Free University of Berlin, and a number of town halls for the Amerika Haus network.

== Personal life ==
Steineger lives solo in a 1920s Craftsman bungalow in Rosedale district of Kansas City.

== See also ==
- List of American politicians who switched parties in office
