= Lynne Oharah =

American politician

Member of the Kansas House of Representatives from the 4th district
- In office January 10, 2005 – January 8, 2007
- Preceded by: Andrew Howell6
- Succeeded by: Shirley Palmer

Personal details
- Born: August 13, 1947 (age 79) Fort Scott, Kansas
- Party: Republican

Lynne Oharah (born August 13, 1947) is an American politician who served in the Kansas House of Representatives from the 4th district from 2005 to 2007.
