= Bud Burke =

American politician

President of the Kansas Senate
- In office 1989 – January 12, 1997
- Preceded by: Robert Talkington
- Succeeded by: Dick Bond

President of the National Conference of State Legislatures
- In office 1991–1992
- Preceded by: John L. Martin
- Succeeded by: Art Hamilton

Member of the Kansas State Senate from the 9th District
- In office 1975–1996
- Preceded by: Robert Frederick Bennett
- Succeeded by: Richard M. Becker

Member of the Kansas House of Representatives from the 28th District
- In office 1973–1974

Personal details
- Born: January 4, 1934 Kansas City, Missouri, U.S.
- Died: August 17, 2017 Lawrence, Kansas, U.S.
- Party: Republican
- Spouse: Patricia Ann Pierson
- Children: 4
- Education: University of Kansas

Paul E. "Bud" Burke Jr (January 4, 1934–August 17, 2017) was a politician from Kansas who spent over twenty years in the Kansas state legislature, predominantly in the Kansas State Senate.

Burke was born in Kansas City, Missouri and attended Shawnee Mission High School in 1952. He received a bachelor of science from the University of Kansas in 1956. He served in the U.S. Air Force from 1956 to 1959 as a fighter pilot, and then in the U.S. Naval Reserves from 1963 to 1988 as a carrier-trained aviator, achieving the rank of captain. He married Patricia Ann Pierson in 1955, and was elected to the Kansas House of Representatives in 1972, taking office in 1973.

After one term in the House, Burke was appointed in 1975 to fill the Senate seat of Robert Frederick Bennett, who had been elected Governor. Burke successfully ran for re-election in his own right in 1976, and spent the next two decades in the Senate. He served as chair of the Senate Tax Committee, was majority leader of the Senate from 1985 to 1989, and was president of the Senate from 1989 until his retirement from the legislature; he declined to run for reelection in 1996.

After his legislative retirement, Burke moved to Lawrence, Kansas, where he died in 2017.
