= Ross Doyen =

American politician

President of the Kansas Senate
- In office 1976–1984
- Preceded by: Richard Rogers
- Succeeded by: Robert Talkington

Member of the Kansas Senate from the 23rd district
- In office January 12, 1969 – January 11, 1993
- Succeeded by: Mark Parkinson

President of the National Conference of State Legislatures
- In office 1981–1982
- Preceded by: Richard Hodes
- Succeeded by: William F. Passannante

Member of the Kansas House of Representatives
- In office January 12, 1959 – January 12, 1969
- Constituency: 61st district (1959–1961); 58th district (1961–1965); 56th district (1965–1967); 97th district (1967–1969)

Personal details
- Born: October 1, 1926 Rice, Kansas, U.S.
- Died: July 3, 2014 (aged 87) Concordia, Kansas, U.S.
- Party: Republican
- Spouse(s): Judy Elniff (m. 1964, divorced) Katherine Mosburg (m. 1993)
- Children: 2
- Education: Kansas State University (B.S. in Agricultural Engineering, 1950)

Military service
- Allegiance: United States
- Branch/service: United States Navy
- Battles/wars: World War II

Ross O. Doyen (October 1, 1926 – July 3, 2014) was an American rancher, farmer, and politician.

== Early life and education ==
Doyen was born on October 1, 1926, in a farm home near Rice, Kansas. He was the third of four sons born to Mr. and Mrs. Orville Doyen. Doyen attended a one-room rural school in Rice for eight years, where he typically had three to five classmates. He then attended high school for four years in Concordia, Kansas, where he later resided.

== Military service ==
During World War II, Doyen served in the United States Navy for 21 months. His service took him to Oklahoma, Tennessee, Texas, and Maryland, where he worked as an aviation machinist's mate and an aerial gunner.

== Higher education and early career ==
In 1946, Doyen entered Kansas State University, graduating in 1950 with a Bachelor of Science degree in agricultural engineering. After completing his education, he utilized his training in agricultural engineering to engage in family farm operations alongside his father and brother, Ray. Together, they operated 1,000 acres of cultivated land and 400 acres of pasture land in Cloud County, east of Concordia, Kansas. Their farming operations included approximately 300 head of cattle and calves.

== Political career ==
=== Kansas House of Representatives (1959–1969) ===
Doyen was first elected to the Kansas House of Representatives in 1958 and was sworn in at the beginning of the 1959 session. He served five terms in the House, representing various districts over the years: the 61st district (1959–1961), 58th district (1961–1965), 56th district (1965–1967), and the 97th district (1967–1969). His entry into the House was influenced by a pivotal moment in a country store in Rice, Kansas, where a phone call led to his nomination for the state representative position.

=== Kansas State Senate (1969–1993) ===
In January 1969, following a reapportionment that created a new Senate district encompassing his residence and excluding an incumbent senator, Doyen was elected to the Kansas State Senate, representing the 23rd district. He served in the Senate until January 1993. During his tenure, Doyen held significant leadership roles, including President of the Senate from 1976 to 1984 and Chairman of the Ways and Means Committee. His leadership was instrumental in shaping fiscal policies and legislative initiatives within the state.

=== National and intergovernmental roles ===
Doyen served as the president of the National Republican Legislators Association and was a past president of the National Conference of State Legislatures. On July 23, 1985, President Ronald Reagan appointed Doyen as a member of the Advisory Commission on Intergovernmental Relations for a two-year term, succeeding Miles Yeoman Ferry.

=== Legislative collaboration ===
Doyen was known for his collaborative efforts within the Kansas Legislature. According to Senator Mitch McConnell's remarks in the Congressional Record, Doyen worked closely with fellow legislator Bill R. Fuller on issues related to agriculture and livestock. Their partnership was pivotal in advancing agricultural policies that benefited Kansas farmers and ranchers, showcasing Doyen's commitment to his constituents and his ability to work effectively within the legislative framework.

== Legal involvement ==
=== Burnett v. Doyen (1976) ===
In 1976, Ross O. Doyen was involved in the Supreme Court of Kansas case **Burnett v. Doyen**, 220 Kan. 400 (1976). The case centered around the Kansas Open Meeting Law and whether the Republican Caucus within the Kansas Senate should be open to the public.

==== Case summary ====
===== Plaintiff-appellee =====
Stephen B. Burnett, a newsman for a Topeka television station.

===== Defendants-appellants =====
Ross O. Doyen, Norman E. Gaar, Joseph C. Harder, J.C. Tillotson, and Robert W. Storey, all Republican members of the Kansas Senate.

===== Issue =====
Whether the Republican Caucus meeting was subject to the Kansas Open Meeting Law (K.S.A. 1975 Supp. 75-4317, et seq.), requiring it to be open to the public.

===== Court's decision =====
The Supreme Court of Kansas declared the case moot following significant amendments to the relevant Kansas statutes, which removed references to party caucuses from the Senate Rules.

==== Impact ====
The case led to legislative amendments in 1976, significantly altering the Kansas Open Meeting Law by removing references to party caucuses in Senate Rules. This change reinforced the state's commitment to transparent governmental proceedings and clarified procedural guidelines for legislative meetings.

=== State, Ex Rel. v. Bennett (1976) ===
In the same year, Doyen was involved in another significant case,

**State, Ex Rel. v. Bennett**

219 Kan. 285 (1976). This case addressed the constitutional doctrine of the separation of powers within Kansas state government.

==== Case summary ====
Appellant:

State of Kansas, represented by Curt T. Schneider, attorney general.

Appellees:

Robert F. Bennett, Governor of Kansas, and other state officials, including Ross O. Doyen.

Issue:

Whether members of the Kansas Legislature, including Doyen as President of the Senate, serving on the State Finance Council, constituted an unconstitutional delegation or usurpation of executive powers, thereby violating the separation of powers doctrine.

Court's decision:

The Supreme Court of Kansas dismissed the appeal as moot due to changes in the State Finance Council's composition and functions. The court acknowledged that while the separation of powers doctrine is fundamental, practical governance often involves overlapping roles. The court emphasized that in complex governmental systems, absolute separation is impractical and that legislative members may serve on administrative boards provided it does not result in a significant usurpation of executive powers.

==== Impact ====
The case underscored the delicate balance between maintaining clear separations of power within state government and the practical necessities of collaborative governance. Although the appeal was dismissed as moot, the court's discussion contributed to the understanding of how legislative members can participate in administrative roles without overstepping constitutional boundaries.

== Political views and legislative impact ==
Doyen considered himself a moderate Republican, though he acknowledged having conservative views in certain areas. He supported the principles advocated by Ronald Reagan and admired Reagan's efforts in improving welfare situations in California. Doyen was a proponent of the "right to work" principle, believing that individuals should have the basic right to choose whether or not to join a labor union. He expressed that while he did not strongly oppose unionization, he believed that membership should not be mandatory.

== Personal life ==
Doyen was married twice. He married Judy Elniff of Jewell in 1964, and they had two daughters, Cindy (born from Judy's previous marriage and adopted by Ross) and Angela. After their divorce, Doyen married Katherine Mosburg in 1993. He resided in Concordia, Kansas, with his family and continued his involvement in farming alongside his family members. Doyen died on July 3, 2014, in Concordia, Kansas.

== Legacy ==
Doyen is remembered for his long-standing commitment to agricultural and fiscal policies in Kansas. His leadership roles within the Kansas Legislature and national legislative organizations highlighted his influence in shaping state and intergovernmental relations. Additionally, his collaborative work with fellow legislators like Bill R. Fuller left a lasting impact on agricultural policy and legislative practices in the state. His involvement in significant legal cases underscored his active participation in upholding legislative integrity and governance principles.

Kansas House of Representatives
Preceded by H. M. Christensen	Kansas House of Representatives 61st district January 12, 1959 - January 9, 1961	Succeeded by R. Bruce Johnson

Kansas House of Representatives
Preceded by Fred Meek	Kansas House of Representatives 58th district January 9, 1961 - January 11, 1965	Succeeded by Charles F. Heath

Kansas House of Representatives
Preceded by Raymond F. Carlson	Kansas House of Representatives 56th district January 11, 1965 - January 9, 1967	Succeeded by Edward Kessinger

Kansas House of Representatives
Preceded by Leo B. Dixen	Kansas House of Representatives 97th district January 9, 1967 - January 12, 1969	Succeeded by Raymond Zajic
