= Denver D. Hargis =

American politician (1921–1989)

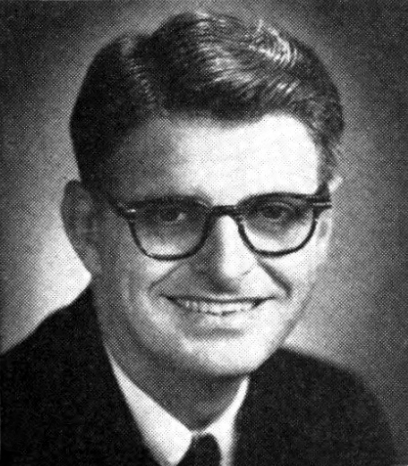

Member of the U.S. House of Representatives from Kansas's 3rd district
- In office January 3, 1959 – January 3, 1961
- Preceded by: Myron V. George
- Succeeded by: Walter L. McVey Jr.

Mayor of Coffeyville, Kansas
- In office 1953–1958
- Preceded by: Gus A. Erickson
- Succeeded by: Norton Walters

Personal details
- Born: July 22, 1921 Key West, Florida, U.S.
- Died: March 16, 1989 (aged 67) Sarasota, Florida, U.S.
- Party: Democratic
- Spouse(s): Jeanette Louise Pitzen (m. 1942, divorced) Charlene June Greer (m. 1951; div. 1969) Betty Jean Smith (m. 1969)

Denver David Hargis (July 22, 1921 – March 16, 1989) was a U.S. representative from Kansas from 1959 to 1961.

Born in Key West, Florida, his maternal grandfather and grandmother were each from Spain and England. In 1922, when Hargis was one year old, his parents moved to Coffeyville, Kansas. He attended Coffeyville schools. He enlisted in the United States Navy in January 1941 and served until October 1943. He graduated from Washburn University, Topeka, Kansas, with a B.A. in 1946, and from its law school, with a LL.B. in 1948. He was admitted to the bar in 1948 and commenced his practice of law in Coffeyville, Kansas.

In February 1949, he was appointed district supervisor of the Census Bureau for the Third District of Kansas. He was promoted to administrative officer for Kansas, Missouri, and Nebraska, and was later promoted to regional assistant and served until December 1950. He served as mayor of Coffeyville, Kansas from 1953 to 1958. He was appointed by Governor Docking as a member of the Arkansas River Basin Committee 1957–59. He served as delegate at large to Democratic National Convention in 1960. He was an unsuccessful candidate for election in 1956 to the Eighty-fifth Congress.

Hargis was elected as a Democrat to the Eighty-sixth Congress (January 3, 1959 – January 3, 1961). He was an unsuccessful candidate for reelection in 1960 to the Eighty-seventh Congress. He served as a consultant for the Department of Defense from 1961 to 1962, and the Department of Commerce from 1962 to 1966. He was the manager and later owner of several title insurance companies in Florida until his retirement in 1985.

On October 17, 1965, Hargis's estranged wife, Charlene June Hargis, shot and killed the couple's four children, three daughters and one son, at their Laurel, Maryland apartment. The former congressman was living with another woman in Vienna, Virginia at the time. Charlene Hargis was charged with four counts of murder and pleaded insanity. While at Spring Grove Hospital, she attempted suicide by slashing her wrists and had to be sedated. She was found guilty of lesser charges of manslaughter and was sentenced to four concurrent terms of ten years in prison.

He was a resident of Sarasota, Florida until his death there in 1989. Hargis was buried at Arlington National Cemetery, Section 37, Grave 921.

U.S. House of Representatives
Preceded by Myron V. George	Member of the U.S. House of Representatives from Kansas's 3rd congressional district January 3, 1959 – January 3, 1961	Succeeded by Walter Lewis McVey Jr.
