= Bill Feuerborn =

American politician

Member of the Kansas House of Representatives from the 5th district
- In office June 4, 1994 – January 14, 2013
- Succeeded by: Kevin Jones

Personal details
- Born: February 11, 1948 (age 78) Garnett, Kansas, U.S.
- Party: Democratic
- Spouse: Lynda Feuerborn
- Children: 3

Bill Feuerborn was an American politician. He was a Democratic member of the Kansas House of Representatives, representing the 5th district. He began his first term on June 4, 1994 and was defeated by Kevin Jones in 2012.

Prior to his election, Feuerborn served on the USD 365 School Board for four years, including serving as president in 1993. He has owned his own business and been involved in the business sector for over 35 years.

Feuerborn has been married to his wife Lynda for 32 years. They have three children and five grandchildren.

== Committee membership ==
- Appropriations (Ranking Member)
- Vision 2020
- Education Budget
- Joint Committee on Special Claims Against the State
- Joint Committee on State Building Construction.

== Major donors ==
The top 5 donors to Feuerborn's 2008 campaign were all professional associations:

- 1. Kansas National Education Assoc $1,000
- 2. Kansas Contractors Assoc $1,000
- 3. Kansas Bankers Assoc $800
- 4. Kansas Medical Society $750
- 5. Kansas Livestock Assoc $750
