= Shirley Palmer (Kansas politician) =

American politician (1943–2023)

Member of the Kansas House of Representatives from the 4th district
- In office January 8, 2007 – January 10, 2011
- Preceded by: Lynne Oharah
- Succeeded by: Caryn Tyson

Personal details
- Born: January 26, 1943 (age 83) Fort Scott, Kansas, U.S.
- Died: March 28, 2023 (aged 80) Fort Scott, Kansas, U.S.
- Party: Democratic
- Spouse: Ronald Palmer
- Education: Pittsburg State University
- Profession: Educator

Shirley Palmer (January 26, 1943 – March 28, 2023) was an American politician who served as a Democratic member of the Kansas House of Representatives, represented the 4th district from 2007 to 2011. Palmer ran for re-election in 2010, but was defeated by Republican Marty Read.

Palmer obtained undergraduate and master's degrees in education from Pittsburg State University. Prior to being elected, she served as the Democratic Chairperson of Bourbon County, Kansas.

She was a teacher in Kansas for nearly 40 years, retiring in 2005. She served on the Kansas Board of Regents. She also served as the National President of Pittsburg State University Alumni Association.

She was married to her husband Ron for 45 years. They had two sons and two grandchildren.

== Issue positions ==
Palmer's main issue was public education. In addition she worked to rebuild Southeast Kansas Communities damaged by flooding in 2007.

== Committee membership ==
- Commerce and Labor
- Higher Education
- Agriculture and Natural Resources
- Joint Committee on Administrative Rules and Regulations.

== Major donors ==
The top 5 donors to Palmer's 2008 campaign:

- 1. Bourbon Co Democratic Central Comm $1,000
- 2. Beachner Construction Co $1,000
- 3. Palmer, Ronald $1,000
- 4. Kansas Contractors Assoc $1,000
- 5. Kansas Medical Society $1,000
