= Marty Read =

American politician

Member of the Kansas House of Representatives from the 4th district
- In office January 14, 2013 – January 9, 2017
- Preceded by: Caryn Tyson
- Succeeded by: Trevor Jacobs

Personal details
- Born: December 18, 1949 (age 76) Fort Scott, Kansas, U.S.
- Party: Republican
- Spouse: Beverly

Marty Read (December 18, 1949) is a Republican member of the Kansas House of Representatives, representing the newly redistricted 4th district (Mound City, Kansas in Linn County, Kansas), defeating Shirley Palmer. He is an Auctioneer, Realtor, Rancher and a freshman Representative. The American Conservative Union gave him a 100% evaluation in 2016.
