= Rice, Kansas =

Unincorporated community in Cloud County, Kansas

- Unincorporated community
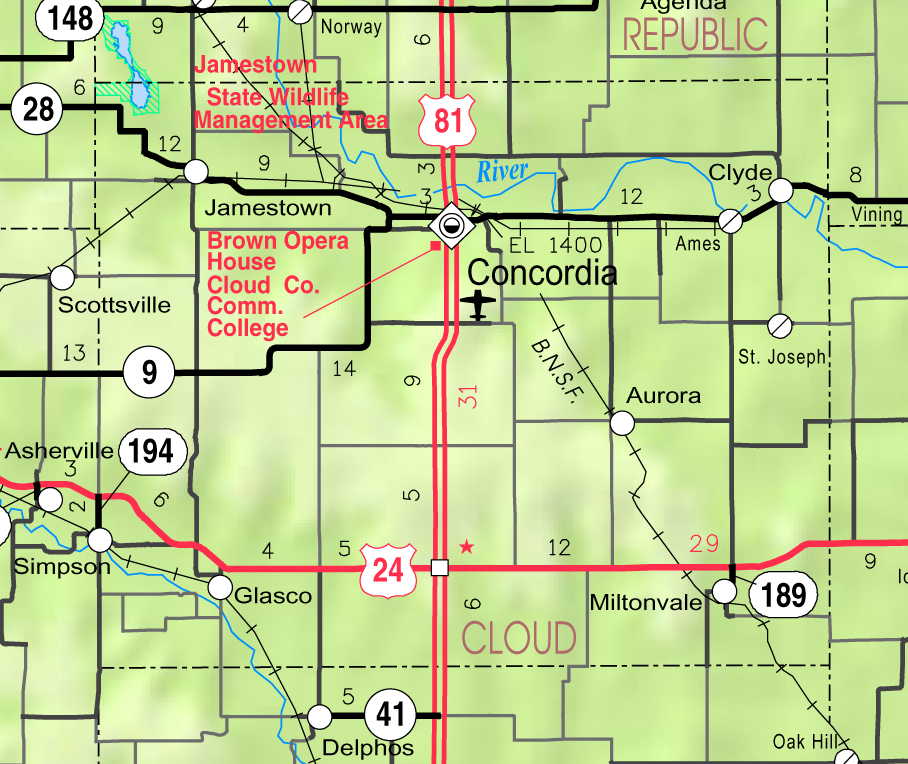
- KDOT map of Cloud County (legend)

- Location within Kansas Location within the United States
- Coordinates: 39°34′20″N 97°33′20″W
- Country: United States
- State: Kansas
- County: Cloud
- Founded: 1870s
- Elevation: 1,335 ft (407 m)
- Time zone: UTC-6 (CST)
  - Summer (DST): UTC-5 (CDT)
- Area code: 785
- FIPS code: 20-59150
- GNIS ID: 473341

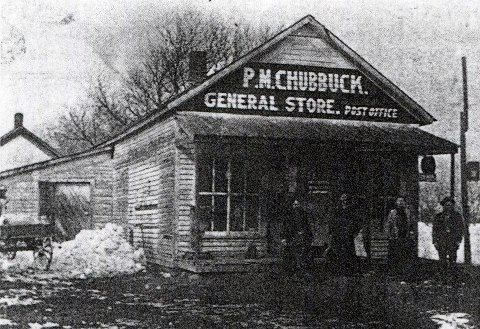
Historical photo of the General Store and Post Office in Rice

Rice is an unincorporated community in Cloud County, Kansas, United States. It is located 3.75 miles east of Concordia.

== History ==
In the 19th century, Rice was a station on the Central Branch Union Pacific Railroad, but the town's proximity to the larger trading center of Concordia inhibited its growth.

A post office was opened in Rice in 1878, and remained in operation until it was discontinued in 1980.

== Education ==
The community is served by Concordia USD 333 public school district.

== Notable people ==
- Ross Doyen, farmer, rancher, and Kansas state legislator, was born near Rice.
