= Bill Wisdom (Kansas politician) =

American politician

Member of the Kansas Senate from the 6th district
- In office 1993 – January 13, 1997
- Preceded by: John Steineger
- Succeeded by: Chris Steineger

Member of the Kansas House of Representatives from the 31st district
- In office 1975–1992
- Preceded by: Harley Huggins
- Succeeded by: Pat Pettey

Personal details
- Born: April 11, 1932 Cottonwood, Coal County, Oklahoma, U.S.
- Died: January 21, 2004 Houston, Texas
- Party: Democratic
- Spouse: Joann Wisdom
- Children: 2
- Education: Kansas City Kansas Community College

Bill Wisdom (April 11, 1932 – January 21, 2004) was an American politician who served in the Kansas state legislature from 1975 to 1996.

Wisdom was born and grew up in Oklahoma. He moved to Kansas as a young man to attend Kansas City Kansas Community College, and subsequently worked as a supervisor for General Motors.

Wisdom was originally elected to the Kansas House of Representatives in 1975. He served for 9 terms as a Democrat, leaving the House in 1992; in that year, he was elected to the Kansas State Senate succeeding John Steineger, where he served a single term before being replaced by John's son Chris Steineger.
