= Louis Ruiz =

American politician

Member of the Kansas House of Representatives from the 31st district
- Incumbent
- Assumed office January 14, 2013
- Preceded by: Stan Frownfelter

Member of the Kansas House of Representatives from the 32nd district
- In office January 10, 2005 – January 14, 2013
- Preceded by: Rick Rehorn
- Succeeded by: Michael Peterson

Personal details
- Born: August 7, 1953 (age 72)
- Party: Democratic
- Spouse: Marthel Parsons-Ruiz

Louis Ruiz (born August 7, 1953) is a Democratic member of the Kansas House of Representatives, representing several districts in Kansas City since 2005. He is a retired employee of Lucent Technologies.
