= John Crofoot =

American politician (1927–1988)

Member of the Kansas State Senate from the 12th District
- In office 1971–1972
- Preceded by: Louise Porter

Member of the Kansas State Senate from the 17th District
- In office 1973–1980
- Preceded by: John Simpson
- Succeeded by: Jerry Karr

Personal details
- Born: March 24, 1927 Chase County, Kansas
- Died: August 23, 1988 (aged 61) Wichita, Kansas
- Party: Republican
- Spouse: Marian Hurst

John William Crofoot (March 24, 1927–August 23, 1988) was an American politician, born in Chase County, Kansas. He served as a Republican member of the Kansas State Senate from 1971 to 1980, representing the 12 and 17th districts.

In addition to his time in the State Senate, he was a farmer and rancher. He also founded an advertising company, Western Associates.

Crowfoot died on August 23, 1988, in Wichita, Kansas.
