= Courtney Sappington =

American politician

Member of the Kansas House of Representatives from the 5th district
- Incumbent
- Assumed office October 13, 2025
- Preceded by: Carrie Barth

Personal details
- Born: 1987-1988
- Party: Republican
- Spouse: Daryl Sappington
- Children: 3
- Education: Truman State University (BS) Thunderbird School of Global Management (MS)

Courtney Sappington (born 1987–1988) is an American politician serving the 5th district in the Kansas House of Representatives. A Republican, she entered office October 13, 2025 following resignation of Carrie Barth.

== Biography ==
Sappington received an undergraduate degree in political science from Truman State University where she served as President of the College Republicans and she received an M.S. in Global Management from Thunderbird School of Global Management. She and her husband are members of Redemption Bible Church in Baldwin City. She has served on the Baldwin City Recreation Commission board.
