= Bonnie Sharp =

American politician

Member of the Kansas House of Representatives from the 31st district
- In office 1997–2006
- Preceded by: Pat Pettey
- Succeeded by: Stan Frownfelter

Personal details
- Born: September 3, 1946 Kansas City, Kansas
- Died: March 21, 2013 (aged 66) Kansas City, Kansas
- Party: Democratic
- Spouse: Elmer W. Sharp (m. January 22, 1966)
- Children: 1
- Education: University of Missouri-Kansas City

Bonnie Jean Sharp (September 3, 1946 – March 21, 2013) was an American politician who served in the Kansas House of Representatives as a Democrat from the 31st district from 1997 until the end of 2006. Sharp was elected in 1996, and was re-elected continuously until she declined to run for re-election in 2006.
