= Pat Apple =

Republican member of the Kansas Senate

Member of the Kansas Senate from the 37th district
- In office January 14, 2013 – April 10, 2014
- Preceded by: Raymond Merrick
- Succeeded by: Molly Baumgardner

Member of the Kansas Senate from the 12th district
- In office January 10, 2005 – January 14, 2013
- Preceded by: Robert Tyson
- Succeeded by: Caryn Tyson

Personal details
- Born: August 31, 1957 (age 68)
- Party: Republican
- Spouse: Debbie Apple
- Children: 2
- Occupation: Master electrician and electrical contractor

Patton M. Apple, known as Pat, (born August 31, 1957) was a Republican member of the Kansas Senate, representing the 37th district from 2013 to 2014. He succeeded Robert Tyson to represent the 12th district from 2005 to 2013. After redistricting for the 2012 elections, he filed for the District 37 seat. The American Conservative Union gave him a 92% evaluation. He was previously involved in the Board of Education for the Unified School District 416 (1991–2003). From 2003 to 2005, he was a Miami County Commissioner for District 4.

He resigned in April 2014 to become a member of the Kansas Corporation Commission (KCC), a state agency which regulates motor carriers, public utilities, pipelines and the oil and gas industries. He was appointed to the post by Gov. Sam Brownback on March 24, 2014, and confirmed by a Kansas Senate vote on April 6, 2014. He became chairman of the board in January 2017, and his terms expired in March 2018. In December 2017, he announced that he would not be seeking reappointment to the board for another four-year term.

== Committee assignments ==
Apple served on these legislative committees:

- Utilities (chair)
- Ethics and Elections (vice-chair)
- Assessment and Taxation
- Joint Committee on Energy and Environmental Policy
- Organization, Calendar and Rules
- Joint Committee on State Building Construction
- Transportation

== Sponsored legislation ==
Apple co-sponsored a resolution claiming states' rights, a resolution encouraging the formation of a U.S. Airborne Laser defense program, a resolution supporting the formation of a budget stabilization fund, and a bill concerning crimes involving alcohol.

== Major donors ==
Some of the top contributors to Apple's 2008 campaign, according to OpenSecrets:

Kansas Republican Senatorial Committee, Kansas Chamber of Commerce, Koch Industries, Cox Communications, Kansas Contractors Association, Kansas Bankers Association

Energy and natural resources companies were his largest donor group.

== Elections ==
=== 2012 ===
After redistricting for the 2012 election, Apple filed for the Senate District 37 seat. Apple defeated Daniel B. Campbell and Kansas House member Charlotte O'Hara in the August 7 Republican primary and was unopposed in the general election, which took place on November 6, 2012.

The Senate District 37 seat was held by Ray Merrick from 2011 to 2013. Merrick, a former state representative, chose to run for House District 27 in 2012, with the expressed intent of being elected speaker of the House. Merrick went on to win the House seat and was elected House speaker on Dec. 2, 2012.
