= Molly Baumgardner =

American politician

Member of the Kansas Senate from the 37th district
- In office April 30, 2014 – January 13, 2025
- Preceded by: Pat Apple
- Succeeded by: Doug Shane

Personal details
- Born: March 4, 1959 (age 67) Olathe, Kansas, U.S.
- Party: Republican
- Spouse: Dr. Brian Baumgardner
- Children: 4
- Education: University of Saint Mary; University of Missouri-Kansas City; Johnson County Community College
- Occupation: Communications Coordinator, JCCC

Martha J. Baumgardner (born March 4, 1959) is a Republican former member of the Kansas Senate, who represented District 37 from April 2014 until January 2025. She lives in Louisburg, Kansas.

She currently serves as Communications Coordinator, and 10 years prior was a professor and Student News Center advisor at Johnson County Community College in Overland Park. Baumgardner taught and coached at Louisburg High School for seven years. Her prior corporate and healthcare experience includes Kustom Electronics, Control Data, United Telecom, The Pillsbury Corporation, Humana Medical Center and KU Medical Center.

She served 18 years as a countywide elected member of the Johnson County Community College board of trustees.

== Elections ==
=== 2014 ===
The Senate District 37 seat had been held by Pat Apple from 2013 to 2014. Apple resigned in April 2014 to join the Kansas Corporation Commission, a state agency. Apple was nominated by Gov. Sam Brownback in March 2014 for the post, and confirmed by a Senate vote in April 2014.

Baumgardner was elected by precinct committee leaders in northern Miami and southern Johnson counties to fill the seat vacated by Apple through the end of the 2014 legislative session.

Baumgardner defeated Charlotte O'Hara in the August 7, 2014 Republican primary and was unopposed in the 2014 general election on November 4.

=== 2016 ===
Baumgardner defeated Kevin King in the 2016 general election on November 4.

=== 2020 ===
Baumgardner defeated Becca Peck in the 2020 general election on November 3, and was unopposed in the primary election.

Baumgardner has served as Chair of the Kansas Senate Education Committee since the 2017 Legislative session. She has served as Chair and Vice-Chair of the Joint Corrections and Juvenile Justice Committee since 2015 and was Vice-Chair of the Joint Foster Care Oversight Committee in 2021. Baumgardner has served on the following Kansas Senate Committees: Taxation and Assessment, Commerce, Public Health and Welfare, and Judiciary. She has also served as a member, Vice-Chair and Chair of the Select Education Committee on School Funding.
