= Alvin Sykes =

American civil rights activist (1956–2021)

Alvin Sykes (21 July 1956 – 19 March 2021) was a civil rights activist who investigated unsolved murder cases of African Americans that occurred during the Civil Rights Movement era within the United States. He was also the impetus for the Emmett Till Unsolved Civil Rights Crime Act, a federal law enacted in 2008. The Emmett Till law is due to expire and Sykes was seeking to expand the law and make it permanent.

Sykes was primarily responsible for Kansas City police reopening their investigation into the 1970 murder of politician and business owner Leon Jordan. In 2010, new evidence suggested local mobsters or their associates were involved in his murder.

Sykes was born on July 21, 1956, to a 14-year-old girl who was a victim of rape. A family friend took him in when he was eight days old and raised him as his unofficial adoptive mother.

In the New York Times obituary written by Clay Risen, he says this about Sykes: “Though he never took a bar exam, Mr. Sykes was a brilliant legal and legislative operator whose admirers included City Council members, politicians and U.S. attorneys general from both parties.” In the same obit, Brian Levin, the director of the Center for the Study of Hate and Extremism at California State University, San Bernardino, said, “Anyone who worked in civil rights during the last several decades knew Alvin Sykes. He changed the face of American law, and he learned it all in a Kansas City library.”
