= Kansas's 37th Senate district =

American legislative district

Kansas's 37th State Senate district
Senator
Doug Shane; R–Louisburg
- Demographics: 85% White; 2% Black; 4% Hispanic; 5% Asian; 1% Native American; 2% Other
- Population (2018): 79,728

Kansas's 37th Senate district is one of 40 districts in the Kansas Senate. It has been represented by Republican Doug Shane since 2025.

== Geography ==
District 37 covers southern Johnson County and northern Miami County in the outskirts of the Kansas City suburbs, including Paola, Spring Hill, Louisburg, Edgerton, and the southern reaches of Gardner, Olathe, and Overland Park.

The district overlaps with Kansas's 2nd and 3rd congressional districts, and with the 5th, 6th, 8th, 26th, 27th, 43rd, 48th, and 78th districts of the Kansas House of Representatives. It borders the state of Missouri.

== Recent election results ==
=== 2024 ===
2024 Kansas Senate election, District 37
Party	Candidate	Votes	%
Republican	Doug Shane	21,460	59.3
Democratic	Sherry Giebler	14,705	40.7
Total votes		36,165	100
Republican hold			

=== 2020 ===
2020 Kansas Senate election, District 37
Party	Candidate	Votes	%
Republican	Molly Baumgardner	30,758	65.3
Democratic	Becca Peck	16,319	34.7
Total votes		47,077	100
Republican hold			

=== 2016 ===
2016 Kansas Senate election, District 37
Party	Candidate	Votes	%
Republican	Molly Baumgardner	24,965	68.1
Democratic	Kevin King	11,709	31.9
Total votes		36,674	100
Republican hold			

=== 2014 special ===
2014 Kansas Senate special election, District 37
Primary election
Party	Candidate	Votes	%
Republican	Molly Baumgardner	4,042	59.9
Republican	Charlotte O'Hara	2,702	40.1
Total votes		6,744	100
General election
Republican	Molly Baumgardner	19,461	100
Total votes		19,461	100
Republican hold			

=== 2012 ===
2012 Kansas Senate election, District 37
Primary election
Party	Candidate	Votes	%
Republican	Pat Apple (incumbent)	4,751	64.6
Republican	Charlotte O'Hara	2,165	29.4
Republican	Daniel Campbell	441	6.0
Total votes		7,357	100
General election
Republican	Pat Apple (incumbent)	27,888	100
Total votes		27,888	100
Republican hold			

=== Federal and statewide results ===
Year	Office	Results
2020	President	Trump 60.5 – 37.3%
2018	Governor	Kobach 50.8 – 41.4%
2016	President	Trump 62.1 – 31.5%
2012	President	Romney 68.0 – 30.2%
