= Bill Wisdom (Australian rules footballer) =

Australian rules footballer

Personal information
- Full name: William Lang Wisdom
- Born: 30 May 1912
- Died: 9 March 1940 (aged 27); Adelaide, South Australia
- Original team: North Adelaide / North Shore AFC
- Height: 179 cm (5 ft 10 in)
- Weight: 81 kg (179 lb)

Playing career^{1}
Years	Club	Games (Goals)
1936	Richmond	2 (0)
- ^{1} Playing statistics correct to the end of 1936.

William Lang Wisdom (30 May 1912 – 9 March 1940) was an Australian rules footballer who played with Richmond in the Victorian Football League (VFL). He died in a car accident in Adelaide, aged 27. The vehicle he was travelling in collided with a tram.
