= Mark Samsel =

American politician

Member of the Kansas House of Representatives from the 5th district
- In office January 14, 2019 – January 9, 2022
- Preceded by: Kevin Jones
- Succeeded by: Carrie Barth

Personal details
- Born: Wellsville, Kansas, U.S.
- Party: Republican
- Education: Missouri Valley College; University of Kansas (JD)
- Profession: Attorney
- Website: marksamsel.org

Mark Samsel is an attorney, a Kansas politician and Republican former member of the Kansas House of Representatives, as well as a former substitute teacher.

== Early life and education ==
Samsel was born in Wellsville, Kansas and attended Wellsville High School in Wellsville, Kansas. He attended Missouri Valley College from 2003 to 2007 and earned a degree in political science, public administration, and business administration. He also attended the University of Kansas School of Law from 2007 to 2010, earning a Juris Doctor.

== Career ==
Following his graduation from law school, Samsel obtained his license and practiced law for several years at the firm Lathrop & Gage, where he was named partner in 2017. Samsel was elected to the Kansas House of Representatives in 2018 and reelected in 2020. In February 2021, though 110 members voted for terminating the exemption that prohibited spouses from being charged with sexual battery, Samsel was one of 10 men, joined by three women, who voted to retain the exemption. Speaking on the floor about the bill, Samsel said, "When you sign up for marriage, what does that involve? Not just for the next day, but for hopefully 30 and 40 and 50 years to come. There was a couple of college students before covid that came through last year. And instead of just no meaning no, and trying to get that for consent, it was actually yes means yes. So those are discussions that I hope this body continues to have."

=== Wellsville High School ===
On April 28, 2021, Samsel was arrested for battery on a Wellsville high school student, jailed, then released on $1,000 bond, allowing him to return to the legislative session on May 3. He had discussed suicide, sex, masturbation, God and the Bible in class, referring to one student as, "...a sophomore who's tried killing himself three times," ostensibly caused by him having, "...two parents and they're both females." "He's a foster kid. His alternatives in life were having no parents or foster care parents who are gay," Samsel told his students. "How do you think I'm going to feel if he commits suicide? Awful."

His students captured their substitute teacher Samsel on video as he gave permission to other students to kick a classmate "in the balls." In his rant to students, he had asked, "Who likes making babies? That feels good, doesn't it? Procreate. You haven't masturbated? Don't answer that question. God already knows." In other videos Samsel is shown focusing most of his attention on a male student, telling him, "You're about ready to anger me and get the wrath of God. Do you believe me when I tell you that God has been speaking to me?" He pushed him, and the student ran to the opposite side of the classroom, yelling. He also called Republican Kansas Senate President Ty Masterson "the devil disguised in a suit and a smile." Masterson had called Samsel's classroom behavior "The troubled rantings of a deranged man." Samsel is alleged to have stated that God told him to kick the student in the balls. The student allegedly showed a deputy sheriff a golf ball-sized, 'road rash' and a long scratch in his back after the alleged assault. According to an affidavit by the deputy sheriff the student maintained that "his back and testicles were in pain" for roughly 15 minutes.

==== Aftermath ====
After his arrest, Samsel resigned from the board of trustees of his alma mater, Missouri Valley College. He was arraigned on three counts of misdemeanor battery to which he pleaded not guilty; the presiding judge ordered Samsel to undergo a mental health exam. He appeared in court on July 12, 2021, but his court-ordered mental health examination had yet to be completed. In September 2021, Samsel pleaded guilty three charges of disorderly conduct under a deal with a local prosecutor. In addition to being placed on a year of probation, Samsel agreed to apologize in writing to his victims, seek mental health treatment, and avoid personal social media use. Samsel lost his Republican primary to Carrie Barth on August 2, 2021, and left office on January 9, 2022.

== Electoral history ==
Kansas 5th State House District Republican Primary, 2018
Party	Candidate	Votes	%
Republican	Mark Samsel	1,454	53.4
Republican	Renee Slinkard	1,266	46.6
Total votes		2,721	100.0

Kansas 5th State House District General Election, 2018
Party	Candidate	Votes	%
Republican	Mark Samsel	5,683	72.8
Democratic	Lassey Murphy	2,120	27.2
Total votes		7,803	100.0

Kansas 5th State House District Republican Primary, 2020
Party	Candidate	Votes	%
Republican	Mark Samsel (incumbent)	2,181	60.2
Republican	Mark Powls	1,442	39.8
Total votes		2,721	100.0

Kansas 5th State House District General Election, 2020
Party	Candidate	Votes	%
Republican	Mark Samsel (incumbent)	8,061	77.3
Democratic	Roger Sims	2,362	22.7
Total votes		10,423	100.0

Kansas 5th State House District Republican Primary, 2022
Party	Candidate	Votes	%
Republican	Carrie Barth	2,677	62.9
Republican	Mark Samsel (incumbent)	1,576	37.1
Total votes		4,253	100.0
