= Charlotte O'Hara =

American politician (born 1951)

Member of the Kansas House of Representatives from the 27th district
- In office January 10, 2011 – January 14, 2013
- Preceded by: Ray Merrick
- Succeeded by: Ray Merrick

Personal details
- Born: January 7, 1951 (age 75) Fort Scott, Kansas, U.S.
- Party: Republican
- Spouse: Spencer O'Hara
- Education: University of Kansas (BA)
- Website: Campaign website

Charlotte O'Hara (born January 7, 1951) is an American politician. A Republican, she served as a member of the Kansas House of Representatives from 2011 to 2013, representing District 27. O'Hara was a Johnson County commissioner from 2021 to 2025. She previously served as a member of the Kansas City and the Olathe Home Builders Associations and served as chairwoman on the Olathe Board of Code Review.

== State legislature ==
=== 2010 state house election ===
O'Hara was elected by Republican precinct delegates to fill a vacancy in the State House of Representatives early in 2011. The vacancy occurred after Kansas Sen. Jeff Colyer was elected lieutenant governor in the 2010 general election. House District 27 Representative Ray Merrick was elected by Republican precinct committee members to fill the remainder of Colyer's Senate District 37 term; then O'Hara was elected to fill Merrick's House seat.

=== 2012 state senate election ===
After redistricting for the 2012 elections, O'Hara filed for the Kansas Senate District 37 seat being vacated by Ray Merrick. O'Hara placed second in a three-way Republican primary, losing to Pat Apple.

== 2026 gubernatorial election ==
In March 2025, O'Hara announced her candidacy in the 2026 Kansas gubernatorial election. She placed fifth in the Republican primary.
