= Kansas's 6th Senate district =

American legislative district

Kansas's 6th State Senate district
Senator
| Pat Pettey; D–Kansas City |
- Demographics: 48% White; 10% Black; 34% Hispanic; 4% Asian; 3% Other
- Population (2018): 70,089

Kansas's 6th Senate district is one of 40 districts in the Kansas Senate. It has been represented by Democrat Pat Pettey since 2013, following her defeat of Democrat-turned-Republican Chris Steineger.

== Geography ==
District 6 is based in southern Kansas City in Wyandotte County and Johnson County, also covering parts of Edwardsville, Merriam, and Overland Park.

The district is located entirely within Kansas's 3rd congressional district, and overlaps with the 24th, 31st, 32nd, 33rd, 36th, and 37th districts of the Kansas House of Representatives. It borders the state of Missouri, located directly to the west of that state's Kansas City.

== Recent election results ==
=== 2020 ===
2020 Kansas Senate election, District 6
| Party | Candidate | Votes | % |
|---|---|---|---|
| Democratic | Pat Pettey (incumbent) | 14,533 | 64.4 |
| Republican | Diana Whittington | 8,050 | 35.6 |
| Total votes | | 22,853 | 100 |
| Democratic hold | | | |

=== 2016 ===
2016 Kansas Senate election, District 6
| Party | Candidate | Votes | % |
|---|---|---|---|
| Democratic | Pat Pettey (incumbent) | 12,640 | 70.8 |
| Libertarian | Jason Conley | 5,213 | 29.2 |
| Total votes | | 17,853 | 100 |
| Democratic hold | | | |

=== 2012 ===
2012 Kansas Senate election, District 6
Primary election
| Party | Candidate | Votes | % |
|---|---|---|---|
| Democratic | Pat Pettey | 1,842 | 72.6 |
| Democratic | Mario Escobar | 695 | 27.4 |
| Total votes | | 2,537 | 100 |
General election
| Democratic | Pat Pettey | 11,637 | 62.1 |
| Republican | Chris Steineger (incumbent) | 7,106 | 37.9 |
| Total votes | | 18,743 | 100 |
| Democratic gain from Republican | | | |

=== Federal and statewide results ===
| Year | Office | Results |
|---|---|---|
| 2020 | President | Biden 61.9 – 35.8% |
| 2018 | Governor | Kelly 64.1 – 27.4% |
| 2016 | President | Clinton 56.9 – 36.1% |
| 2012 | President | Obama 61.6 – 35.8% |
