= Kevin Jones (politician) =

American Green Beret and politician

Member of the Kansas House of Representatives from the 5th district
- In office January 14, 2013 – January 14, 2019
- Preceded by: Bill Feuerborn
- Succeeded by: Mark Samsel

Personal details
- Born: December 19, 1974 (age 51)
- Party: Republican

Kevin Jones (born December 19, 1974) is an American politician and former Green Beret. He is a Republican member of the Kansas House of Representatives, representing the 5th district (Wellsville, Kansas in Franklin County, Kansas), defeating four-term incumbent Bill Feuerborn in 2012. The American Conservative Union gave him a lifetime evaluation of 86%.

Jones is the father of eight children. On July 6, 2015, Jones ran the course on American Ninja Warrior and was eliminated in the first obstacle.
