= Kansas's 12th Senate district =

American legislative district

Kansas's 12th State Senate district
Senator
Caryn Tyson; R–Parker
- Demographics: 92% White; 1% Black; 3% Hispanic; 0% Asian; 1% Native American; 2% Other
- Population (2018): 68,721

Kansas's 12th Senate district is one of 40 districts in the Kansas Senate. It has been represented by Republican Caryn Tyson since 2013.

== Geography ==
District 12 covers Allen, Anderson, Franklin, and Linn Counties and parts of Bourbon and Miami Counties along the eastern edge of the state. Communities in the district include Ottawa, Iola, Osawatomie, Garnett, Humboldt, Wellsville, and Pleasanton.

The district is located entirely within Kansas's 2nd congressional district, and overlaps with the 2nd, 4th, 5th, 6th, 9th, and 59th districts of the Kansas House of Representatives. It borders the state of Missouri.

== Recent election results ==
=== 2020 ===
2020 Kansas Senate election, District 12
Party	Candidate	Votes	%
Republican	Caryn Tyson (incumbent)	24,265	74.4
Democratic	Mike Bruner	8,359	25.6
Total votes		32,624	100
Republican hold			

=== 2016 ===
2016 Kansas Senate election, District 12
Party	Candidate	Votes	%
Republican	Caryn Tyson (incumbent)	18,998	73.3
Democratic	Christopher Johnston	6,918	26.7
Total votes		25,916	100
Republican hold			

=== 2012 ===
2012 Kansas Senate election, District 12
Primary election
Party	Candidate	Votes	%
Republican	Caryn Tyson	6,226	56.1
Republican	John Coen	4,864	43.9
Total votes		11,090	100
General election
Republican	Caryn Tyson	18,720	65.8
Democratic	Denise Cassells	9,737	34.2
Total votes		28,457	100
Republican hold			

=== Federal and statewide results ===
Year	Office	Results
2020	President	Trump 72.4 – 25.4%
2018	Governor	Kobach 54.6 – 37.2%
2016	President	Trump 69.6 – 23.9%
2012	President	Romney 65.3 – 32.1%
