= 2016 Kansas Senate election =

- November 8, 2016

All 40 seats in the Kansas Senate 21 seats needed for a majority
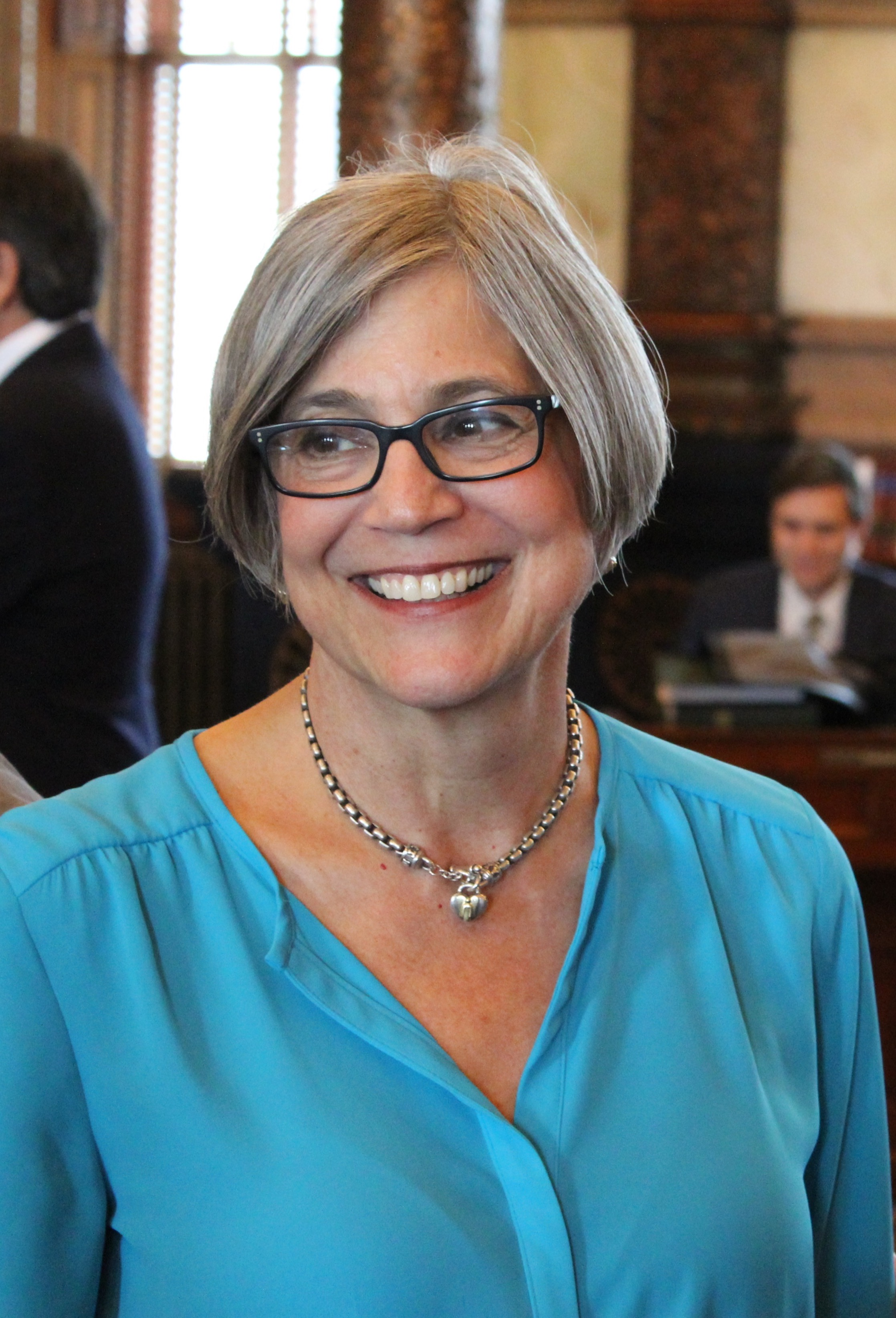

| | Majority party | Minority party |
|---|---|---|
| Leader | Susan Wagle | Anthony Hensley |
| Party | Republican | Democratic |
| Leader since | January 14, 2012 | January 8, 1996 |
| Leader's seat | District 30 | District 19 |
| Last election | 32 | 8 |
| Seats after | 31 | 9 |
| Seat change | ▼1 | ▲1 |
| Popular vote | 657,057 | 476,683 |
| Percentage | 57.56% | 41.76% |
President of the Senate before election
Susan Wagle
Republican
Elected President of the Senate
Susan Wagle
Republican

The 2016 Kansas Senate election was held on November 8, 2016, to determine which party would control the Kansas Senate for the following four years in the 87th and 88th Kansas state Legislature. All 40 seats in the Kansas Senate were up for election and the primary was held on August 2, 2016. Prior to the election, 32 seats were held by Republicans and 8 seats were held by Democrats. The general election saw Democrats flipping a single seat, however Republicans retained their majority in the State Senate.

== Predictions ==
| Source | Ranking | As of |
|---|---|---|
| Governing | Likely R | October 12, 2016 |

== Retirements ==
=== Republicans ===
1. District 7: Kay Wolf retired.
2. District 15: Jeff King retired.
3. District 25: Michael O'Donnell retired.
4. District 27: Leslie Donovan retired.
5. District 32: Steve Abrams retired.
6. District 33: Mitch Holmes retired.
7. District 38: Garrett Love retired.
8. District 40: Ralph Ostmeyer retired.

== Incumbents defeated ==
=== In primary ===
==== Republicans ====
1. District 11: Jeff Melcher lost renomination to John Skubal.
2. District 14: Forrest Knox lost renomination to Bruce Givens.
3. District 21: Greg Smith lost renomination to Dinah Sykes.
4. District 24: Tom Arpke lost renomination to Randall Hardy.
5. District 34: Terry Bruce lost renomination to Ed Berger.
6. District 39: Larry Powell lost renomination to John Doll.

== Closest races ==
Seats where the margin of victory was under 10%:

1. District 5, 1.94%
2. District 10, 2.62%
3. District 28, 2.92%
4. District 3, 3.06%
5. District 18, 3.20%
6. District 8, 5.56%
7. District 21, 7.94%
8. District 7, 8.60%

== Results ==
=== District 1 ===
District 1 election, 2016
| Party | Candidate | Votes | % |
|---|---|---|---|
| Republican | Dennis Pyle (incumbent) | 18,283 | 59.30% |
| Democratic | Jerry Henry | 13,076 | 41.70% |
| Total votes | | 31,359 | 100.0% |
| Republican hold | | | |

=== District 2 ===
District 2 election, 2016
| Party | Candidate | Votes | % |
|---|---|---|---|
| Democratic | Marci Francisco (incumbent) | 24,147 | 66.11% |
| Republican | Meredith Richey | 12,378 | 33.89% |
| Total votes | | 36,525 | 100.0% |
| Democratic hold | | | |

=== District 3 ===
District 3 election, 2016
| Party | Candidate | Votes | % |
|---|---|---|---|
| Democratic | Tom Holland (incumbent) | 17,214 | 51.53% |
| Republican | Echo Van Meteren | 16,189 | 48.47% |
| Total votes | | 33,403 | 100.0% |
| Democratic hold | | | |

=== District 4 ===
District 4 election, 2016
| Party | Candidate | Votes | % |
|---|---|---|---|
| Democratic | David Haley (incumbent) | 17,090 | 100.0% |
| Total votes | | 17,090 | 100.0% |
| Democratic hold | | | |

=== District 5 ===
District 5 election, 2016
| Party | Candidate | Votes | % |
|---|---|---|---|
| Republican | Steve Fitzgerald (incumbent) | 13,336 | 50.97% |
| Democratic | Bill Hutton | 12,828 | 49.03% |
| Total votes | | 26,164 | 100.0% |
| Republican hold | | | |

=== District 6 ===
District 6 election, 2016
| Party | Candidate | Votes | % |
|---|---|---|---|
| Democratic | Pat Pettey (incumbent) | 12,640 | 70.80% |
| Libertarian | Jason Conley | 5,213 | 29.20% |
| Total votes | | 17,853 | 100.0% |
| Democratic hold | | | |

=== District 7 ===
District 7 election, 2016
| Party | Candidate | Votes | % |
|---|---|---|---|
| Republican | Barbara Bollier | 22,439 | 54.30% |
| Democratic | Megan England | 18,884 | 45.70% |
| Total votes | | 41,323 | 100.0% |
| Republican hold | | | |

=== District 8 ===
District 8 election, 2016
| Party | Candidate | Votes | % |
|---|---|---|---|
| Republican | Jim Denning (incumbent) | 19,847 | 52.78% |
| Democratic | Don McGuire | 17,758 | 47.22% |
| Total votes | | 37,605 | 100.0% |
| Republican hold | | | |

=== District 9 ===
District 9 election, 2016
| Party | Candidate | Votes | % |
|---|---|---|---|
| Republican | Julia Lynn (incumbent) | 20,574 | 60.01% |
| Democratic | Chris Morrow | 13,708 | 39.99% |
| Total votes | | 34,282 | 100.0% |
| Republican hold | | | |

=== District 10 ===
District 10 election, 2016
| Party | Candidate | Votes | % |
|---|---|---|---|
| Republican | Mary Pilcher-Cook (incumbent) | 18,673 | 51.31% |
| Democratic | Vicki Hiatt | 17,722 | 48.69% |
| Total votes | | 36,395 | 100.0% |
| Republican hold | | | |

=== District 11 ===
District 11 election, 2016
| Party | Candidate | Votes | % |
|---|---|---|---|
| Republican | John Skubal | 25,992 | 65.02% |
| Democratic | Skip Fannen | 13,983 | 34.98% |
| Total votes | | 39,975 | 100.0% |
| Republican hold | | | |

=== District 12 ===
District 12 election, 2016
| Party | Candidate | Votes | % |
|---|---|---|---|
| Republican | Caryn Tyson (incumbent) | 18,998 | 73.31% |
| Democratic | Christopher Johnston | 6,918 | 26.69% |
| Total votes | | 25,916 | 100.0% |
| Republican hold | | | |

=== District 13 ===
District 13 election, 2016
| Party | Candidate | Votes | % |
|---|---|---|---|
| Republican | Jake LaTurner (incumbent) | 15,737 | 56.15% |
| Democratic | Lynn Grant | 12,291 | 43.85% |
| Total votes | | 28,028 | 100.0% |
| Republican hold | | | |

=== District 14 ===
District 14 election, 2016
| Party | Candidate | Votes | % |
|---|---|---|---|
| Republican | Bruce Givens | 20,452 | 72.64% |
| Democratic | Mark Pringle | 7,702 | 27.36% |
| Total votes | | 28,154 | 100.0% |
| Republican hold | | | |

=== District 15 ===
District 15 election, 2016
| Party | Candidate | Votes | % |
|---|---|---|---|
| Republican | Dan Goddard | 15,511 | 60.89% |
| Democratic | Chuck Schmidt | 9,963 | 39.11% |
| Total votes | | 25,474 | 100.0% |
| Republican hold | | | |

=== District 16 ===
District 16 election, 2016
| Party | Candidate | Votes | % |
|---|---|---|---|
| Republican | Ty Masterson (incumbent) | 20,980 | 64.66% |
| Democratic | Gabriel Costilla | 11,467 | 35.34% |
| Total votes | | 32,447 | 100.0% |
| Republican hold | | | |

=== District 17 ===
District 17 election, 2016
| Party | Candidate | Votes | % |
|---|---|---|---|
| Republican | Jeff Longbine (incumbent) | 13,161 | 59.00% |
| Democratic | Susan Fowler | 9,147 | 41.00% |
| Total votes | | 22,308 | 100.0% |
| Republican hold | | | |

=== District 18 ===
District 18 election, 2016
| Party | Candidate | Votes | % |
|---|---|---|---|
| Democratic | Laura Kelly (incumbent) | 15,007 | 51.60% |
| Republican | Dave Jackson | 14,076 | 48.40% |
| Total votes | | 29,083 | 100.0% |
| Democratic hold | | | |

=== District 19 ===
District 19 election, 2016
| Party | Candidate | Votes | % |
|---|---|---|---|
| Democratic | Anthony Hensley (incumbent) | 16,181 | 57.28% |
| Republican | Zach Haney | 12,068 | 42.72% |
| Total votes | | 28,249 | 100.0% |
| Democratic hold | | | |

=== District 20 ===
District 20 election, 2016
| Party | Candidate | Votes | % |
|---|---|---|---|
| Republican | Vicki Schmidt (incumbent) | 22,216 | 65.36% |
| Democratic | Candace Ayars | 11,775 | 34.64% |
| Total votes | | 33,991 | 100.0% |
| Republican hold | | | |

=== District 21 ===
District 21 election, 2016
| Party | Candidate | Votes | % |
|---|---|---|---|
| Republican | Dinah Sykes | 18,149 | 50.34% |
| Democratic | Logan Heley | 15,287 | 42.40% |
| Libertarian | Michael Kerner | 2,617 | 7.26% |
| Total votes | | 36,053 | 100.0% |
| Republican hold | | | |

=== District 22 ===
District 22 election, 2016
| Party | Candidate | Votes | % |
|---|---|---|---|
| Democratic | Tom Hawk (incumbent) | 20,849 | 100.0% |
| Total votes | | 20,849 | 100.0% |
| Democratic hold | | | |

=== District 23 ===
District 23 election, 2016
| Party | Candidate | Votes | % |
|---|---|---|---|
| Republican | Robert S. Olson (incumbent) | 19,277 | 60.57% |
| Democratic | Spencer Kerfoot | 12,551 | 39.43% |
| Total votes | | 31,828 | 100.0% |
| Republican hold | | | |

=== District 24 ===
District 24 election, 2016
| Party | Candidate | Votes | % |
|---|---|---|---|
| Republican | Randall Hardy | 16,195 | 59.06% |
| Democratic | Donald Merriman | 11,228 | 40.94% |
| Total votes | | 27,423 | 100.0% |
| Republican hold | | | |

=== District 25 ===
District 25 election, 2016
| Party | Candidate | Votes | % |
|---|---|---|---|
| Democratic | Lynn Rogers | 11,704 | 58.49% |
| Republican | Jim Price | 8,308 | 41.51% |
| Total votes | | 20,012 | 100.0% |
| Democratic gain from Republican | | | |

=== District 26 ===
District 26 election, 2016
| Party | Candidate | Votes | % |
|---|---|---|---|
| Republican | Dan Kerschen (incumbent) | 20,274 | 69.47% |
| Democratic | Benjamin Poteete | 8,911 | 30.53% |
| Total votes | | 29,185 | 100.0% |
| Republican hold | | | |

=== District 27 ===
District 27 election, 2016
| Party | Candidate | Votes | % |
|---|---|---|---|
| Republican | Gene Suellentrop | 22,252 | 66.50% |
| Democratic | Tony Hunter | 11,209 | 33.50% |
| Total votes | | 33,461 | 100.0% |
| Republican hold | | | |

=== District 28 ===
District 28 election, 2016
| Party | Candidate | Votes | % |
|---|---|---|---|
| Republican | Mike Petersen (incumbent) | 9,915 | 51.46% |
| Democratic | Keith Humphrey | 9,353 | 48.54% |
| Total votes | | 19,268 | 100.0% |
| Republican hold | | | |

=== District 29 ===
District 29 election, 2016
| Party | Candidate | Votes | % |
|---|---|---|---|
| Democratic | Oletha Faust-Goudeau (incumbent) | 14,511 | 100.0% |
| Total votes | | 14,511 | 100.0% |
| Democratic hold | | | |

=== District 30 ===
District 30 election, 2016
| Party | Candidate | Votes | % |
|---|---|---|---|
| Republican | Susan Wagle (incumbent) | 16,636 | 58.53% |
| Democratic | Anabel Larumbe | 11,786 | 41.47% |
| Total votes | | 28,422 | 100.0% |
| Republican hold | | | |

=== District 31 ===
District 31 election, 2016
| Party | Candidate | Votes | % |
|---|---|---|---|
| Republican | Carolyn McGinn (incumbent) | 23,463 | 74.51% |
| Democratic | J. Michelle Vann | 8,026 | 25.49% |
| Total votes | | 31,489 | 100.0% |
| Republican hold | | | |

=== District 32 ===
District 32 election, 2016
| Party | Candidate | Votes | % |
|---|---|---|---|
| Republican | Larry Alley | 16,221 | 62.23% |
| Democratic | Don Shimkus | 9,844 | 37.77% |
| Total votes | | 26,065 | 100.0% |
| Republican hold | | | |

=== District 33 ===
District 33 election, 2016
| Party | Candidate | Votes | % |
|---|---|---|---|
| Republican | Mary Jo Taylor | 21,114 | 76.55% |
| Democratic | Matt Bristow | 6,467 | 23.45% |
| Total votes | | 27,581 | 100.0% |
| Republican hold | | | |

=== District 34 ===
District 34 election, 2016
| Party | Candidate | Votes | % |
|---|---|---|---|
| Republican | Ed Berger | 21,559 | 82.21% |
| Democratic | Homer Gilson | 4,664 | 17.79% |
| Total votes | | 26,223 | 100.0% |
| Republican hold | | | |

=== District 35 ===
District 35 election, 2016
| Party | Candidate | Votes | % |
|---|---|---|---|
| Republican | Rick Wilborn (incumbent) | 21,271 | 71.36% |
| Democratic | Levi Morris | 8,538 | 28.64% |
| Total votes | | 29,809 | 100.0% |
| Republican hold | | | |

=== District 36 ===
District 36 election, 2016
| Party | Candidate | Votes | % |
|---|---|---|---|
| Republican | Elaine Bowers (incumbent) | 26,816 | 85.12% |
| Democratic | Brian Angevine | 4,686 | 14.88% |
| Total votes | | 31,502 | 100.0% |
| Republican hold | | | |

=== District 37 ===
District 37 election, 2016
| Party | Candidate | Votes | % |
|---|---|---|---|
| Republican | Molly Baumgardner (incumbent) | 24,965 | 68.07% |
| Democratic | Kevin King | 11,709 | 31.93% |
| Total votes | | 36,674 | 100.0% |
| Republican hold | | | |

=== District 38 ===
District 38 election, 2016
| Party | Candidate | Votes | % |
|---|---|---|---|
| Republican | Bud Estes | 12,884 | 75.73% |
| Democratic | Miguel Angel Rodriguez | 4,130 | 24.27% |
| Total votes | | 17,014 | 100.0% |
| Republican hold | | | |

=== District 39 ===
District 39 election, 2016
| Party | Candidate | Votes | % |
|---|---|---|---|
| Republican | John Doll | 12,884 | 79.02% |
| Democratic | A. Zacheriah Worf | 3,421 | 20.98% |
| Total votes | | 16,305 | 100.0% |
| Republican hold | | | |

=== District 40 ===
District 40 election, 2016
| Party | Candidate | Votes | % |
|---|---|---|---|
| Republican | Rick Billinger | 23,964 | 74.26% |
| Democratic | Alex Herman | 8,308 | 25.74% |
| Total votes | | 32,272 | 100.0% |
| Republican hold | | | |
