= 2020 Kansas Senate election =

- November 3, 2020

All 40 seats in the Kansas Senate 21 seats needed for a majority
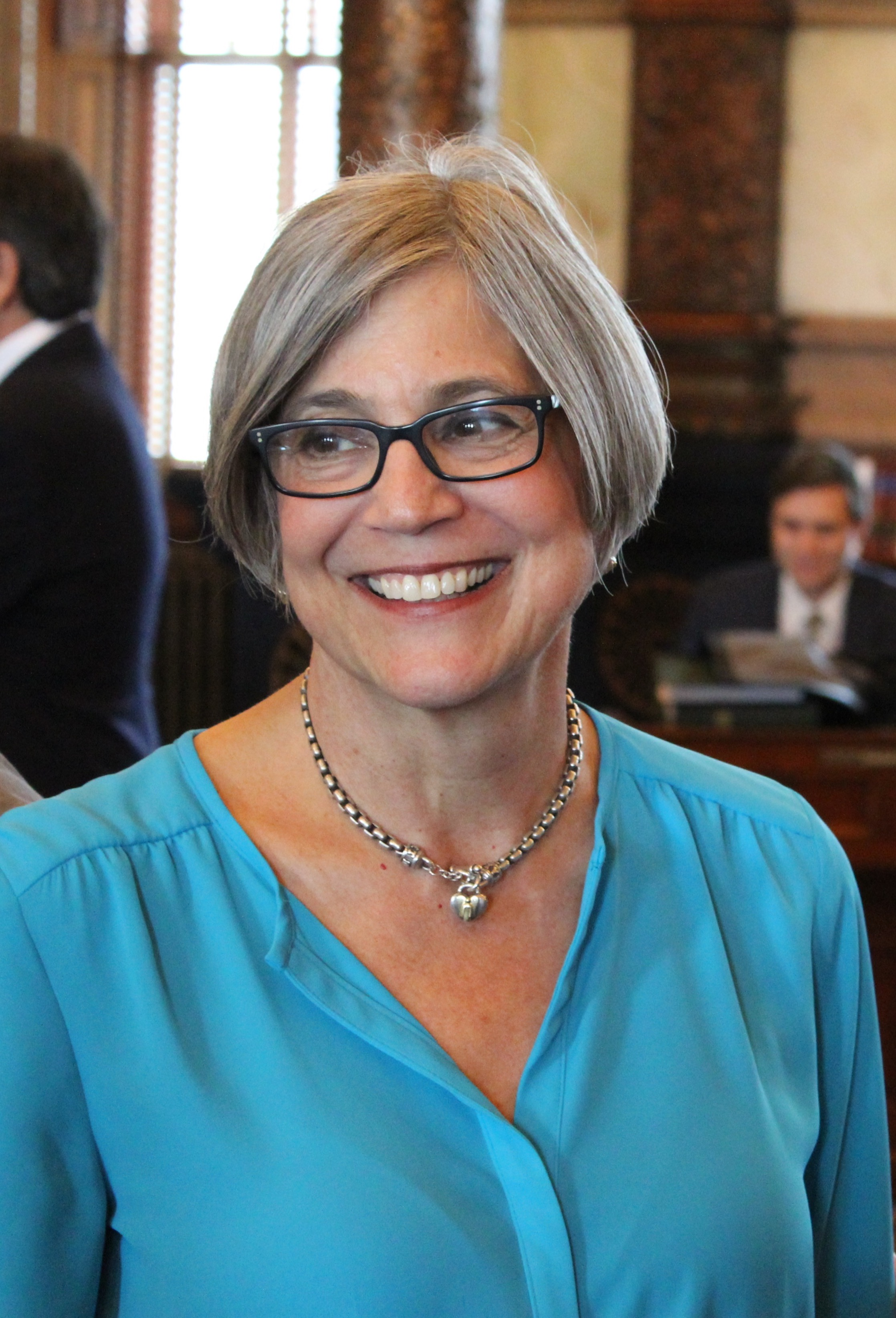

	Majority party	Minority party
Leader	Susan Wagle (retired)	Anthony Hensley (lost re-election)
Party	Republican	Democratic
Leader's seat	30th District	19th district
Seats before	29	11
Seats after	29	11
Seat change	Steady	Steady
Popular vote	817,169	477,582
Percentage	63.11%	36.89%
- Results: Republican hold Democratic hold Republican gain Democratic gain
President of the Senate before election
Susan Wagle
Republican
Elected President of the Senate
Ty Masterson
Republican

The 2020 Kansas Senate election took place as part of the biennial 2020 United States elections. Kansas voters elected state senators in all of the state's 40 senate districts. Senators serve four-year terms.

== Retirements ==
Four incumbents did not run for reelection in 2020. Those incumbents are:

=== Republicans ===
1. District 8: Jim Denning: Retiring
2. District 30: Susan Wagle: Retiring

=== Democrats ===
1. District 7: Barbara Bollier: Retiring; ran for United States Senate
2. District 18: Vic Miller: Retiring

== Incumbents defeated ==
=== In primary elections ===
==== Republicans ====
Seven Republicans lost renomination.

1. District 11: John Skubal lost renomination to Kellie Warren.
2. District 14: Bruce Givens lost renomination to Michael Fagg.
3. District 15: Dan Goddard lost renomination to Virgil Peck Jr.
4. District 20: Eric Rucker lost renomination to Brenda Dietrich.
5. District 24: Randall Hardy lost renomination to J. R. Claeys.
6. District 33: Mary Jo Taylor lost renomination to Alicia Straub.
7. District 34: Ed Berger lost renomination to Mark Steffen.

=== In the general election ===
==== Republican ====
1. District 5: Kevin Braun lost to Jeff Pittman.

==== Democratic ====
1. District 19: Anthony Hensley lost to Rick Kloos.

== Predictions ==
Source	Ranking	As of
The Cook Political Report	Likely R	October 21, 2020

== Results summary ==
Summary of the November 3, 2020 Kansas Senate election results
Party	Candidates	Votes		Seats				
Party	Candidates	No.	%	Before	Up	Won	After	+/–
Republican	39	817,169	63.11%	29	29	29	29	Steady
Democratic	30	477,582	36.89%	11	11	11	11	Steady
Total		1,294,751	100.0%	40	40	40	40	Steady

Popular vote
Republican	63.11%
Democratic	36.89%

Senate seats
Republican	72.5%
Democratic	27.5%

=== Close races ===
Districts where the margin of victory was under 10%:

1. District 22, 1.2%
2. District 3, 2.04%
3. District 19, 2.42% (flip)
4. District 10, 3.72%
5. District 30, 4.22%
6. District 9, 4.52%
7. District 11, 5.36%
8. District 5, 6.04% (flip)
9. District 23, 6.22%
10. District 28, 8.1%
11. District 8, 8.72% (flip)
12. District 25, 9.18%
13. District 21, 9.58%

== Summary of results by State Senate district ==
State Senate district	Incumbent	Party	Elected Senator	Party
Kansas 1	Dennis Pyle	Rep	Dennis Pyle	Rep
Kansas 2	Marci Francisco	Dem	Marci Francisco	Dem
Kansas 3	Tom Holland	Dem	Tom Holland	Dem
Kansas 4	David Haley	Dem	David Haley	Dem
Kansas 5	Kevin Braun	Rep	Jeff Pittman	Dem
Kansas 6	Pat Pettey	Dem	Pat Pettey	Dem
Kansas 7	Barbara Bollier	Dem	Ethan Corson	Dem
Kansas 8	Jim Denning	Rep	Cindy Holscher	Dem
Kansas 9	Julia Lynn	Rep	Beverly Gossage	Rep
Kansas 10	Mike Thompson	Rep	Mike Thompson	Rep
Kansas 11	John Skubal*	Rep	Kellie Warren	Rep
Kansas 12	Caryn Tyson	Rep	Caryn Tyson	Rep
Kansas 13	Richard Hilderbrand	Rep	Richard Hilderbrand	Rep
Kansas 14	Bruce Givens*	Rep	Michael Fagg	Rep
Kansas 15	Dan Goddard*	Rep	Virgil Peck Jr.	Rep
Kansas 16	Ty Masterson	Rep	Ty Masterson	Rep
Kansas 17	Jeff Longbine	Rep	Jeff Longbine	Rep
Kansas 18	Vic Miller	Dem	Kristen O'Shea	Rep
Kansas 19	Anthony Hensley	Dem	Rick Kloos	Rep
Kansas 20	Eric Rucker*	Rep	Brenda Dietrich	Rep
Kansas 21	Dinah Sykes	Dem	Dinah Sykes	Dem
Kansas 22	Tom Hawk	Dem	Tom Hawk	Dem
Kansas 23	Robert S. Olson	Rep	Robert S. Olson	Rep
Kansas 24	Randall Hardy*	Rep	J. R. Claeys	Rep
Kansas 25	Mary Ware	Dem	Mary Ware	Dem
Kansas 26	Dan Kerschen	Rep	Dan Kerschen	Rep
Kansas 27	Gene Suellentrop	Rep	Gene Suellentrop	Rep
Kansas 28	Mike Petersen	Rep	Mike Petersen	Rep
Kansas 29	Oletha Faust-Goudeau	Dem	Oletha Faust-Goudeau	Dem
Kansas 30	Susan Wagle	Rep	Renee Erickson	Rep
Kansas 31	Carolyn McGinn	Rep	Carolyn McGinn	Rep
Kansas 32	Larry Alley	Rep	Larry Alley	Rep
Kansas 33	Mary Jo Taylor*	Rep	Alicia Straub	Rep
Kansas 34	Ed Berger*	Rep	Mark Steffen	Rep
Kansas 35	Rick Wilborn	Rep	Rick Wilborn	Rep
Kansas 36	Elaine Bowers	Rep	Elaine Bowers	Rep
Kansas 37	Molly Baumgardner	Rep	Molly Baumgardner	Rep
Kansas 38	Bud Estes	Rep	Bud Estes	Rep
Kansas 39	John Doll	Rep	John Doll	Rep
Kansas 40	Rick Billinger	Rep	Rick Billinger	Rep
