= Senator Yost =

Senator Yost may refer to:

- Eric Yost (born 1955), Kansas State Senate
- Jack Yost (born 1945), West Virginia State Senate
- Maynard Yost (1936–2019), Colorado State Senate
