= Barbara Lawrence (disambiguation) =

Barbara Lawrence (1930–2013) was an American model and actress.

Barbara Lawrence may also refer to:

- Barbara Lawrence (politician) (born 1934), member of the Kansas State Legislature
- Barbara Lawrence (talent manager) (1943–2026), American talent manager
- Barbara Lawrence (zoologist) (1909–1997), American paleozoologist and museum curator
