= J. R. Claeys =

American politician (born 1978)

J.R. Claeys
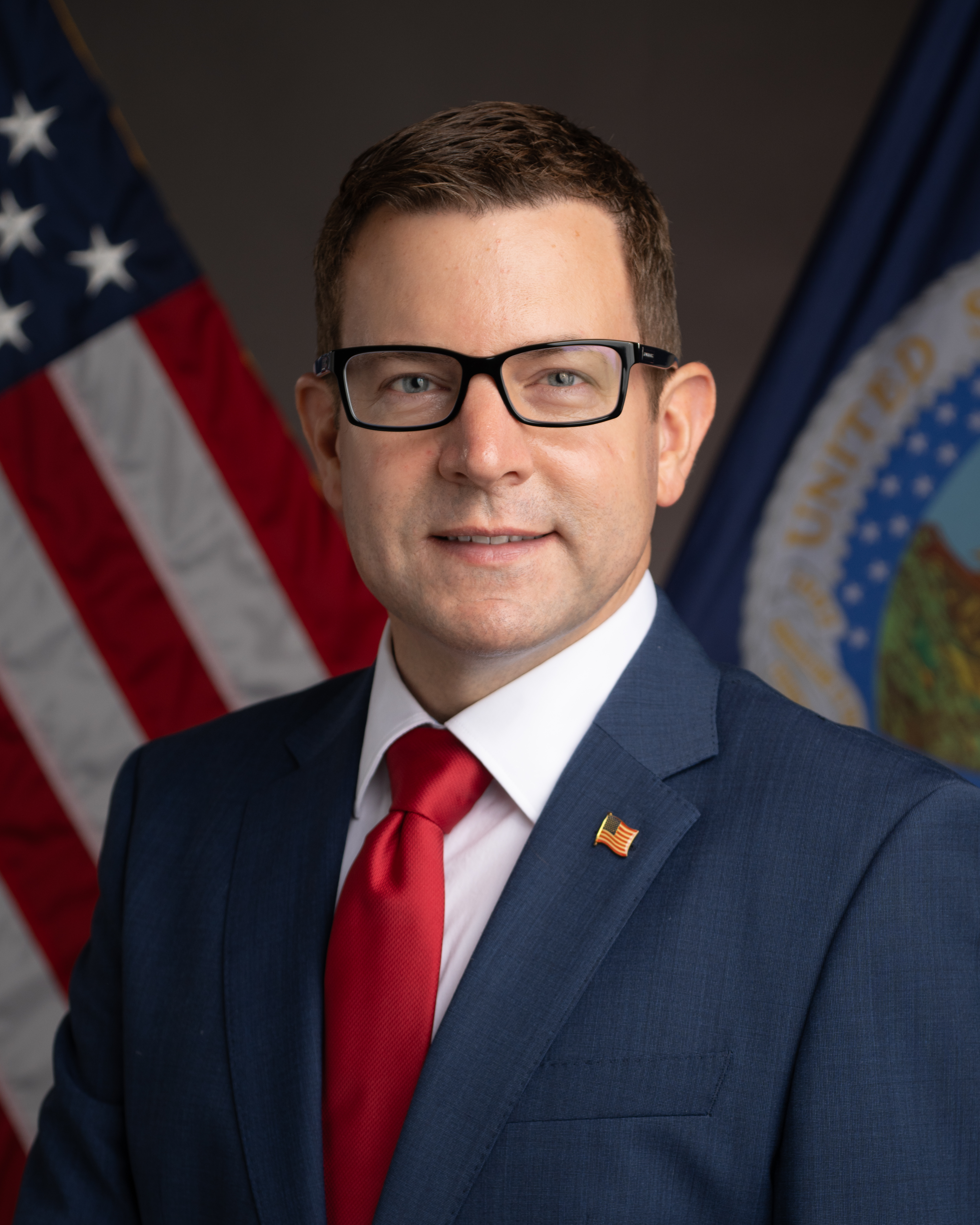
- Claeys in 2025

Administrator of the Rural Business-Cooperative Service
- Incumbent
- Assumed office June 2, 2025
- Preceded by: Betsy Dirksen Londrigan

Member of the Kansas Senate from the 24th district
- In office January 11, 2021 – June 2, 2025
- Preceded by: Randall Hardy
- Succeeded by: Scott Hill

Member of the Kansas House of Representatives from the 69th district
- In office January 14, 2013 – January 11, 2021
- Preceded by: Tom Arpke
- Succeeded by: Clarke Sanders

Personal details
- Born: Jeremy Ryan Claeys; February 13, 1978 (age 48) Salina, Kansas, U.S.
- Party: Republican
- Spouse: Catalin
- Children: 1
- Relatives: Joe Claeys (brother)
- Education: Kansas State University; George Washington University

Jeremy Ryan Claeys (born February 13, 1978) is an American politician serving as the Administrator of the Rural Business-Cooperative Service within the U.S. Department of Agriculture since 2025. He previously served in the Kansas Senate and in the Kansas House of Representatives as a Republican.

== Early life and education ==
Claeys was raised in Salina, Kansas. He graduated from Kansas State University where he studied media and George Washington University where he studied public administration.

== Career ==
Claeys served as the State Senator for the 24th District, which included all of Saline County and most of Dickinson County and the former State Representative for West Salina and Northwest Saline County, and was elected to the 69th District. He has worked as the president and CEO of the National Association of Government Contractors and as communications director of the National Small Business Association.

He was the campaign manager for the 2018 campaign of Kris Kobach for Kansas governor and Wink Hartman for Kansas lieutenant governor. Kobach defeated Gov. Jeff Colyer in the Republican primary and lost to Democratic state Sen. Laura Kelly in the general election.

=== Fraud complaint ===
Claeys was involved in fraudulent activity through the selling of the "Certified Tested Green" label for products. These certifications were sold for between $189.95 to $549.95. According to a Federal Trade Commission complaint, Claeys and his company Tested Green never tested any of the products certified and would certify anyway for simply paying. Part of the purported fraud includes using the claims that the Tested Green certification was endorsed by the National Green Business Association and National Association of Government Contractors. These associations were both owned and operated by Claeys and were in no way independent endorsements. The FTC approved this complaint unanimously at a vote of 5-0. This led to 20 year sanctions on Claeys and his company. Another aspect of fraud in this case was the misrepresentation of the number of clients tested green had certified. Tested Green claimed to be the "nation's leading certification program with over 45,000 certifications in the United States." In reality, the FTC found that only 129 companies had ever been certified.

=== 2010 Kansas Secretary of State campaign ===
He unsuccessfully sought the Republican nomination for Secretary of State of Kansas in 2010. Claeys finished third in the primary behind former Kansas Republican Party Chairman Kris Kobach and Shawnee County Elections Commissioner Libby Ensley.

Results

- Kris Kobach: 156,462
- Libby Ensley: 83,275
- J.R. Claeys: 64,493

== Kansas Legislature ==
On September 6, 2017, Claeys tweeted that he would "rather give money to North Korea than to public radio".

=== 2020 Kansas Senate campaign ===
On June 1, 2020, Claeys announced that he was running for the Kansas Senate in the 24th district, challenging incumbent Randall Hardy in the Republican primary. He dropped his bid for a fifth term in the House of Representatives in order to run for the Senate.

Claeys defeated Senator Hardy in the Aug. 4, 2020 Republican primary. No Democrat filed to run in the 2020 general election.

Results

- J.R. Claeys: 7,728
- Randall Hardy: 4,350

=== Tenure ===
As a state legislator, he has been focused on issues relating to unmanned aerial systems and aviation, including pushing for the state to adopt rules to allow for UAS integration into commercial airspace and the creation of a state UAS director post. This included pushing the Kansas House of Representatives to pass a resolution supporting the state of Kansas' work on UAS issues. He also pushed for a 2013 drone privacy bill to be drafted in a way to protect the Kansas drone economy. In March 2019, he amended the state budget to include funds for Kansas State Polytechnic University to receive $500,000 to hire more instructors for the pilot education program. He has also introduced legislation to create an aviation tax credit program for students studying engineering and aviation in the state and want to work in the Kansas aviation industry. The bill passed the state House of Representatives by a vote of 106-18 in March 2019. He has been active in working with state panels focused on unmanned aerial systems and a pilot program granted to the state by the Federal Aviation Administration.

During a September 2019 meeting of the Kansas Capitol Preservation Committee he questioned why a new plaque including the names of former governors involved in the Kansas Capitol renovation project did not include former legislative leaders involved in the planning. In 2013, he teamed with Reps. Diana Dierks and Steven C. Johnson to donate 100 gallons of milk to a Salina charity for safe exchange between parents in custody disputes, which was matched by Dillons Supermarkets. He was a member of a legislative task force in 2018 that researched and make a series of recommendations for the next Kansas transportation plan.

In 2018 and 2020 Representative Claeys was elected vice chairman of the Kansas Legislature's Joint Committee on State Building Construction and he was elected chairman of the Joint Committee on State Building Construction in 2019. The chairmanship and the vice chairmanship of the building committee alternates annually between the House of Representatives and Senate and the two leaders are elected by the committee rather than being appointed by legislative leaders. His 2018 election as vice chairman came after a nomination by then Republican House Speaker Pro Temp Scott Schwab, now the Kansas Secretary of State, with a second by Democratic state Sen. Laura Kelly, now the Governor of Kansas.

=== Legislative committee assignments ===
Kansas Senate committees 2021-2022

- Vice Chairman of Ways and Means
  - Chairman of Governmental Subcommittee
  - Corrections and Public Safety Subcommittee
  - Labor Subcommittee
- Vice Chairman of Transportation
- Utilities
- Assessment and Taxation
- Joint Committee on State Building Construction

Kansas House committees 2019-2020

- Chairman of General Government Budget
- Chairman of the Joint Committee on State Building Construction (2019)
- Vice Chairman of the Joint Committee on State Building Construction (2020)
- Appropriations
- Transportation
- 2019 Special Committee on Natural Resources

Kansas House committees 2017-2018

- Chairman of Transportation and Public Safety Budget
- Vice Chairman of the Joint Committee on State Building Construction (2018)
- Joint Legislative Transportation Vision Task Force
- Appropriations
- Commerce, Labor and Economic Development
- 2017 Special Committee on Commerce
- Member of the Joint Committee on State Building Construction (2017)

Kansas House committees 2015-2016

- Chairman of Transportation and Public Safety Budget
- Vice Chairman of 2016 Special Committee on Larned and Osawatomie State Hospitals
- Appropriations
- Commerce, Labor and Economic Development
- Joint Committee on Information Technology

Kansas House committees 2013-2014

- Federal and State Affairs
- Commerce, Labor and Economic Development
- Taxation

2019 National Conference of State Legislatures committees

- Natural Resources and Infrastructure
- Communications, Financial Services and Interstate Commerce

== Administrator at the USDA ==
In June 2025 Claeys resigned from the Kansas Senate after being appointed Administrator of the Rural Business-Cooperative Service at the USDA by Donald Trump.

== Personal life ==
The place of residence for Claeys has also come into question. While seeking his second term for the Kansas House of Representatives, it was reported that Claeys had filed to run for office under his sister's address. During the controversy, he claimed to live with his sister, her husband, and their three children for personal reasons. When confronted by a reporter to see that he actually had a living space within his sister's home, he declined to let the reporter enter, stating "I'm not going to be held to a different level of scrutiny than everybody else is," and "It's nobody's business." The listed address was controversial for many reasons, most of which revolved around a property owned by Claeys in Lawrence, Kansas. The property was a condominium valued at $433,400 for tax purposes. A resident who lives in the same complex in Lawrence was quoted as saying "J.R. has a two-car garage and a stall for his boat," and "He votes on issues that come up in the Bella Sera Homeowners Association." Claeys defended having the property stating that was the residence he used while the Kansas House of Representatives was in session. He also defended the price valuation by saying that the apartment was one of several locations he bought out of foreclosure.

His brother, Joseph Claeys, was elected to the 27th district of the Kansas Senate in 2024 which includes northwest Wichita and Maize Kansas.

== Electoral history ==
2020 24th Senate District Republican primary results
Party	Candidate	Votes	%
Republican	J.R. Claeys	7,728	63.0
Republican	Randall Hardy	4,350	37.0

Kansas House of Representatives elections, 2012
Party	Candidate	Votes	%
Republican	J.R. Claeys	3,797	53.9
Democratic	Gary Swartzendruber	3,242	46.0
Republican hold			

Kansas House of Representatives elections, 2014
Party	Candidate	Votes	%
Republican	J.R. Claeys (Incumbent)	3,395	61.1
Democratic	Gary Swartzendruber	2,154	38.8
Republican hold			

Kansas House of Representatives elections, 2016
Party	Candidate	Votes	%
Republican	J.R. Claeys (Incumbent)	3,852	51.8
Democratic	Gerrett Morris	3,575	48.1
Republican hold			

Kansas House of Representatives elections, 2018
Party	Candidate	Votes	%
Republican	J.R. Claeys (Incumbent)	3,298	54.61
Democratic	Gerrett Morris	2,741	45.39
Republican hold			

Kansas Senate
Preceded by Randall Hardy	Member of the Kansas Senate from the 24th district January 11, 2021–June 2, 2025	Succeeded by Scott Hill
Preceded by Rick Billinger	Kansas Senate Vice Chairman of the Ways and Means Committee; January 11, 2021 - June 2, 2025	Succeeded by Vacant
Preceded by Dan Goddard	Kansas Senate Vice Chairman of the Transportation Committee; January 11, 2021 - June 2, 2025	Succeeded by Vacant
Kansas House of Representatives
Preceded by Tom Arpke	Kansas House of Representatives Representative for the 69th District; 2013 - 2021	Succeeded by Clarke Sanders
Preceded by Virgil Peck, Jr.	Kansas House of Representatives Chairman of the Transportation and Public Safety Budget Committee; January 12, 2015 - January 14, 2019	Succeeded by Shannon Francis
Preceded by Bill Sutton	Kansas House of Representatives Chairman of the General Government Budget Committee; January 14, 2019 - January 11, 2021	Succeeded by Bill Sutton
Preceded by Rick Billinger	Kansas Legislature Chairman of the Joint State Building Construction Committee; January 22, 2019 - January 15, 2020	Succeeded by Rick Billinger
