= Stan Clark =

Stan Clark may refer to:

- Stan Clark (rugby league)
- Stan Clark (politician)

== See also ==
- Stanley Clarke (disambiguation)
