= Senator Lawrence =

Senator Lawrence may refer to:

- Barbara Lawrence (politician) (born 1934), Kansas State Senate
- Edward A. Lawrence (1831–1883), New York State Senate
- George P. Lawrence (1859–1917), Massachusetts State Senate
- George V. Lawrence (1818–1904), Pennsylvania State Senate
- John L. Lawrence (1785–1849), New York State Senate
- Jonathan Lawrence (1737–1812), New York State Senate
- Keith Lawrence (politician) (1891–1978), Ohio State Senate
- Mark Lawrence (politician) (born 1958), Maine State Senate
- Myron Lawrence (1799–1852), Massachusetts State Senate
- Sidney Lawrence (1801–1892), New York State Senate
- William Lawrence (Ohio Democrat) (1814–1895), Ohio State Senate
- William Lawrence (Ohio Republican) (1819–1899), Ohio State Senate
- William A. Lawrence (Wisconsin politician) (1822–1890), Wisconsin State Senate

== See also ==
- Akasha Lawrence-Spence (fl. 2020s–present), Oregon State Senate
