= Senator Givens =

Senator Givens may refer to:

- Bruce Givens (born 1956), Kansas State Senate
- David P. Givens (born 1966), Kentucky State Senate
