= Senator Hess =

Senator Hess may refer to:

- Henry L. Hess (1890–1974), Oregon State Senate
- Paul Hess (born 1948), Kansas State Senate
- Ralph Hess (born 1939), Pennsylvania State Senate
