= Senator Hensley =

Senator Hensley may refer to:

- Anthony Hensley (born 1953), Kansas State Senate
- Joey Hensley (born 1955), Tennessee State Senate
- Willie Hensley (born 1941), Alaska State Senate
