= Robert Vancrum =

American politician

Member of the Kansas Senate from the 11th district
- In office 1993–1996
- Preceded by: David Webb
- Succeeded by: Keith Schraad

Member of the Kansas House of Representatives from the 29th district
- In office 1981–1992
- Succeeded by: Thomas Robinett

Personal details
- Born: December 2, 1946 (age 79) El Dorado, Kansas
- Party: Republican

Robert J. Vancrum (born December 2, 1946) is an American former politician and attorney who served in the Kansas House of Representatives and Kansas State Senate.

Vancrum was elected to the Kansas House in 1980, taking office in January 1981. He served six terms in the House, and was elected to the Kansas State Senate in 1992, where he served one term before being succeeded by Keith Schraad.

Vancrum works as an attorney in Overland Park, Kansas.
