= Keith Schraad =

American politician

Member of the Kansas Senate from the 11th district
- In office 1997 – November 16, 1998
- Preceded by: Robert Vancrum
- Succeeded by: John Vratil

Personal details
- Born: March 14, 1961 (age 65)
- Party: Republican
- Education: University of Kansas (B.A.); Washburn University School of Law (J.D.)

Keith Schraad (born March 14, 1961) is an American politician. He served two years in the Kansas State Senate in 1997 and 1998, where he was the vice-chair of the Judiciary Committee.

After his time in the Senate, Schraad left Kansas and moved to Arizona, where he founded a company called Online Insurance Company from 2008 to 2015. In 2018, he was appointed interim director of the Arizona Department of Insurance by Governor Doug Ducey. He has also worked as the vice president of Blue Cross Blue Shield of Arizona.
