= Skubal =

Skubal may refer to:

- John Skubal (born 1946), American politician who served in the Kansas Senate
- Tarik Skubal (born 1996), American baseball pitcher for the Los Angeles Dodgers
