= John Grange (Kansas politician) =

American politician

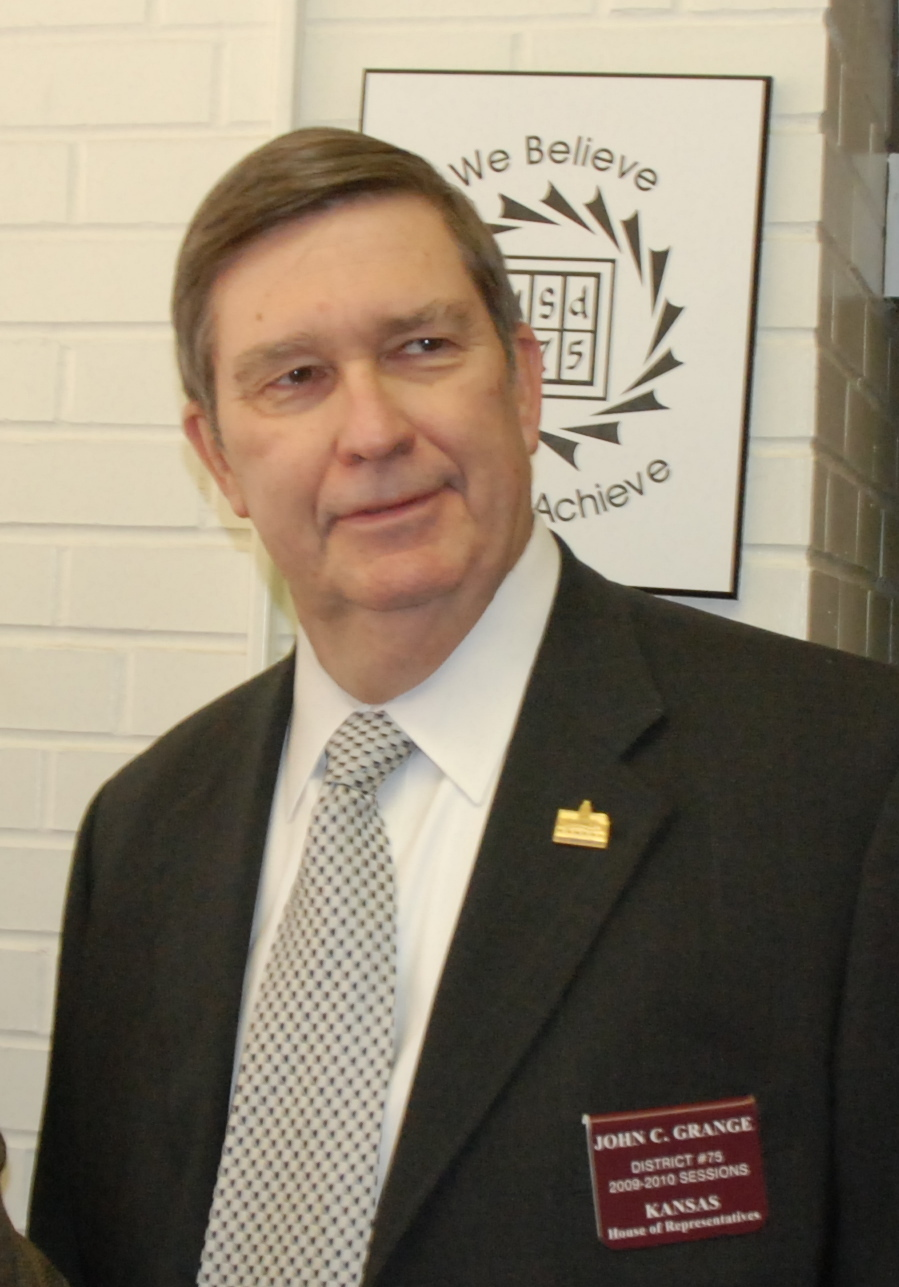
- Grange in 2010

Member of the Kansas House of Representatives from the 75th district
- In office January 10, 2005 – January 14, 2013
- Preceded by: William G. Mason
- Succeeded by: Will Carpenter

Personal details
- Born: July 27, 1949 (age 76) El Dorado, Kansas, U.S.
- Party: Republican
- Spouse: Nancy
- Education: Butler Community College

John Grange (July 27, 1949) is an American politician who served as a member of the Kansas House of Representatives for the 75th district from 2005 to 2013.

== Early life and education ==
Grange was born in El Dorado, Kansas, and attended Butler Community College, where he obtained an associated degree.

== Career ==
Grange served as president of Unified School District 490 Board of Education from 2004 to 2005 and was a member of the board from 2001 to 2005.

Grange served in the Kansas House of Representatives from 2005 until 2013. In 2012, Grange ran for the 14th district of the Kansas Senate, but lost in the primary to fellow Republican State Representative Forrest Knox.

Grange works as a mechanical contractor and is the president and owner of Carlisle Heating, Air Conditioning, Plumbing and Electrical. He is a member of the American Legion, Elks Club, and Veterans of Foreign Wars.
