= Vratil =

Vratil is a surname. Notable people with the surname include:

- John Vratil (born 1945), American politician
- Kathryn Hoefer Vratil (born 1949), American judge
