= Proehl =

Proehl is a surname. Notable people with the surname include:

- Austin Proehl (born 1995), American football player
- Blake Proehl (born 1999), American football player
- Richard Proehl, American politician
- Ricky Proehl (born 1968), American football player and coach
