= Kansas's 15th Senate district =

American legislative district

Kansas's 15th State Senate district
Senator
Virgil Peck Jr. R–Havana
- Demographics: 84% White; 4% Black; 6% Hispanic; 1% Asian; 2% Native American; 4% Other
- Population (2018): 67,332

Kansas's 15th Senate district is one of 40 districts in the Kansas Senate. It has been represented by Republican Virgil Peck Jr. since 2025.

== Geography ==
District 15 covers parts of Southeast Kansas, including all of Neosho County and most of Labette and Montgomery Counties. Communities in the district include Coffeyville, Parsons, Independence, Chanute, Caney, Cherryvale, and Oswego.

The district is located entirely within Kansas's 2nd congressional district, and overlaps with the 2nd, 7th, 9th, 11th, 12th, and 13th districts of the Kansas House of Representatives. It borders the state of Oklahoma.

== Recent election results ==
=== 2020 ===
2020 Kansas Senate election, District 15
Primary election
Party	Candidate	Votes	%
Republican	Virgil Peck Jr.	5,144	50.1
Republican	Dan Goddard (incumbent)	5,126	49.9
Total votes		10,270	100
General election
Republican	Virgil Peck Jr.	23,043	100
Total votes		23,043	100
Republican hold			

=== 2016 ===
2016 Kansas Senate election, District 15
Party	Candidate	Votes	%
Republican	Dan Goddard	3,549	51.2
Republican	Virgil Peck Jr.	3,378	48.8
Total votes		6,927	100
General election
Republican	Dan Goddard	15,511	60.9
Democratic	Chuck Schmidt	9,963	39.1
Total votes		25,474	100
Republican hold			

=== 2012 ===
In 2012, incumbents Jeff King and Dwayne Umbarger were redistricted into the same district.

2012 Kansas Senate election, District 15
Primary election
Party	Candidate	Votes	%
Republican	Jeff King (incumbent)	5,668	57.3
Republican	Dwayne Umbarger (incumbent)	4,224	42.7
Total votes		9,892	100
General election
Republican	Jeff King (incumbent)	21,401	100
Total votes		21,401	100
Republican hold			

=== Federal and statewide results ===
Year	Office	Results
2020	President	Trump 71.2 – 26.8%
2018	Governor	Kobach 57.0 – 35.6%
2016	President	Trump 70.0 – 24.5%
2012	President	Romney 65.6 – 32.1%
