= Dwayne Umbarger =

American politician (born 1952)

Member of the Kansas Senate from the 14th district
- In office January 13, 1997 – January 14, 2013
- Preceded by: William Robert Brady
- Succeeded by: Forrest Knox

Personal details
- Born: August 2, 1952 (age 73) Chanute, Kansas, U.S.
- Party: Republican
- Spouse: Toni
- Education: Pittsburg State University; Neosho County Community College

Dwayne D. Umbarger (August 2, 1952) is a former Republican member of the Kansas Senate, representing the 14th district from 1997 until 2013. He has been the Assistant Majority Whip since 2003. In 1995 and 1996, he was on the ANW Special Education Board in Humbolt, Kansas. He was also a School Board member for the Consolidated Unified School District #101 in Erie from 1994 to 1996.

== Committee assignments ==
Sen. Umbarger serves on these legislative committees:

- Transportation (chair)
- Joint Committee on State Building Construction (vice-chair)
- Joint Committee on Arts and Cultural Resources
- Education
- Joint Committee on Home and Community Based Services Oversight
- Judiciary
- Joint Committee on Legislative Post Audit
- Organization, Calendar and Rules
- Ways and Means

== Major donors ==
Some of the top contributors to Marshall's 2008 campaign, according to the National Institute on Money in State Politics:

Kansas Republican Senatorial Committee, Kansas Association of Realtors, American Federation of State, County and Municipal Employees, Kansas National Education Association, Kansas Dental Association

Health care companies were his largest donor group.
