= Todd Novascone =

American politician

Member of the Kansas House of Representatives from the 99th district
- In office January 8, 2001 – January 2005
- Preceded by: Susan Wagle
- Succeeded by: Ty Masterson

Personal details
- Born: July 31, 1972 (age 53) Wichita, Kansas, U.S.
- Party: Republican
- Spouse: Sarah
- Education: Baylor University

Todd Novascone (born July 31, 1972) is an American politician who served in the Kansas House of Representatives from the 99th district from 2001 to 2005.
