= Stan Clark (politician) =

American politician (1954–2004)

Member of the Kansas Senate from the 40th district
- In office January 9, 1995 – 2004
- Preceded by: Sheila Frahm
- Succeeded by: Ralph Ostmeyer

Personal details
- Born: December 9, 1954 Oakley, Kansas, U.S.
- Died: May 29, 2004 Oakley, Kansas
- Party: Republican
- Spouse: Ruth Clark
- Children: William P. Clark

Stan W. Clark (December 9, 1954 – May 29, 2004) was an American politician who served in the Kansas State Senate as a Republican from 1995 to 2004.

Clark joined the Senate in 1995, succeeding Sheila Frahm, who had been elected Lieutenant Governor. He served in the Senate until his death in 2004 from a car crash. After his death, the legislature created a program called the "Senator Stan Clark pregnancy maintenance initiative program, the purpose for which is to award grants to not-for-profit organizations for programs that provide services for women which enable them to carry their pregnancies to term."
