= Aaron Jack =

American businessman and politician

Member of the Kansas House of Representatives from the 99th district
- In office January 12, 2009 – 2010
- Preceded by: Ty Masterson
- Succeeded by: Dennis Hedke

Personal details
- Born: October 20, 1975 (age 51)
- Party: Republican
- Spouse: Anne
- Education: University of Kansas; Friends University; Washburn University School of Law

Daniel Aaron Jack (born October 20, 1975) is an American businessman and former politician.

== Education ==
Jack received his bachelor's degree from the University of Kansas, his master's degree in business administration from Friends University, and finally his J.D. degree from the Washburn University School of Law. Aaron has been in the financial services industry since 1998. Aaron's education relating to his brokerage qualifications include the Series 6, 63, and 65 licenses.

== Career ==
Jack served as a Republican member of the Kansas House of Representatives, representing the 99th district from 2009 until 2010. In 2011, Jack was appointed Kansas Securities Commissioner serving until February 2013, when he resigned. According to The Topeka Capital-Journal the resignation came with the choice of "resign or be fired" but Jack stated that he was "ready to get back to a private-sector career."

As Securities Commissioner Jack sought to be tough on crime by proposing a litigation fund which would provide more money for securities fraud prosecutions.

In May 2012, Jack was one of only six people to represent the United States at the G-20Y Financial Summit in Mexico CIty, Mexico. That same year he was selected and participated in Leadership Kansas' Class of 2012.

Jack is an investment adviser representative through AWM Asset Management, LLC and a registered representative through United Planners, LLC. Aaron has had no legal orders since becoming insurance licensed in 1999. Jack has also had no disclosure events related to his securities practice.

Aaron Jack served as campaign manager for U.S. Representative Mike Pompeo's first congressional race.

== Committee membership ==
- Federal and State Affairs
- Judiciary

== Major donors ==
The top 5 donors to Jack's 2008 campaign:

1. Jack, Daniel Aaron $20,000
2. Jack, Aaron $2,000
3. Koch Industries $1,000
4. Kansas Medical Society $750
5. Kansas Chamber of Commerce $500
