= Dennis Hedke =

American politician

Member of the Kansas House of Representatives from the 99th district
- In office January 10, 2011 – January 9, 2017
- Preceded by: Aaron Jack
- Succeeded by: Susan Humphries

Personal details
- Born: October 1, 1952 (age 74) Manhattan, Kansas, U.S.
- Party: Republican
- Spouse: Annete Beame (died 2015)
- Children: 2
- Education: Kansas State University
- Profession: Geophysicist

Dennis Eugene Hedke (born October 1, 1952) is an American politician. He has served as a Republican member for the 99th district in the Kansas House of Representatives since 2011. The American Conservative Union gave him a lifetime rating of 88%.
