= Paul Hess =

American politician

Member of the Kansas Senate from the 30th district
- In office 1973–1984
- Succeeded by: Eric Yost

Member of the Kansas House of Representatives from the 80th district
- In office 1971–1972

Personal details
- Born: August 29, 1948 (age 77) Albany, New York
- Party: Republican

Paul Robert Hess (born August 29, 1948) is an American former politician who served in the Kansas state legislature from 1971 to 1984.

Hess was born in Albany, New York. He was originally elected to the Kansas House of Representatives in 1970, serving one term there. In the 1972 elections, he won election to the Kansas State Senate in the 30th district. He served for three terms in the Kansas Senate, during which he rose to chair of the Ways and Means Committee.
