= Jim Kelly (Kansas politician) =

American politician

Member of the Kansas House of Representatives from the 12th district
- In office January 10, 2011 – January 14, 2013
- Preceded by: Jeff King
- Succeeded by: Virgil Peck Jr.

Member of the Kansas House of Representatives from the 11th district
- In office January 14, 2013 – January 13, 2023
- Preceded by: Virgil Peck Jr.
- Succeeded by: Ron Bryce

Personal details
- Born: August 8, 1947 (age 79) Independence, Kansas
- Party: Republican
- Education: Emporia State University
- Website: http://www.RepJimKelly.com

Jim Kelly (born August 8, 1947) is an American politician who served as a Republican member of the Kansas House of Representatives, representing the 12 district from 2011 to 2013 and the 11th district (Independence, Kansas in Montgomery County, Kansas) from 2013 to 2023.
