= Pete Brungardt =

American politician (born 1947)

Member of the Kansas Senate from the 24th district
- In office January 8, 2001 – January 14, 2013
- Preceded by: Ben Vidricksen
- Succeeded by: Tom Arpke

Personal details
- Born: January 30, 1947 (age 79) Salina, Kansas, U.S.
- Party: Republican
- Spouse: Rosie Brungardt
- Children: 2
- Education: Pennsylvania College of Optometry
- Profession: Optometrist

Peter F. Brungardt (born January 30, 1947) is a former Republican member of the Kansas Senate, representing the 24th district from 2001 to 2013. His previous political experiences include the Salina City Planning Commission (1986–1991), Salina City Commission (1991–1999), and Mayor of Salina (1993–1994, 1998–1999).

An optometrist, he is married to Rosie Brungardt.

== Committee assignments ==
Brungardt served on these legislative committees:

- Federal and State Affairs (chair)
- Joint Committee on State-Tribal Relations (chair)
- Joint Committee on Corrections and Juvenile Justice Oversight (vice-chair)
- Ethics and Elections
- Calendar and Rules
- Public Health and Welfare

== Major donors ==
Some of the top contributors to Brungardt's 2008 campaign, according to the National Institute on Money in State Politics:

Kansas Republican Senatorial Committee, Kansas Bankers Association, Senate Republican Leadership Committee of Kansas, Kansas National Education Association, Kansas Contractors Association, Kansas Association of Realtors

Financial, insurance and real estate companies were his largest donor group.

== Elections ==
=== 2012 ===
Brungardt was defeated by Tom Arpke in the August 7, 2012 Republican primary, by a margin of 5,413 to 4,354. Arpke went on to defeat Democratic nominee Janice Norlin in the general election on November 6, 2012.

== See also ==
- List of mayors of Salina, Kansas
