= Eric Yost =

American politician

Eric R. Yost

Member of the Kansas Senate from the 30th district
- In office 1984–1993
- Preceded by: Paul Hess
- Succeeded by: Barbara Lawrence

Member of the Kansas House of Representatives from the 86th district
- In office 1979–1983
- Preceded by: Gerald A. Caywood
- Succeeded by: Henry Helgerson

Personal details
- Born: September 4, 1955 (age 71) Wichita, Kansas
- Education: Wichita State University (B.A.); University of Kansas School of Law (J.D.)

Eric R. Yost (born September 4, 1955) is an American politician, attorney and judge.

Yost was born in Wichita, Kansas. He went to Wichita State University as an undergraduate, studying journalism.

After graduating from Wichita State, Yost was elected to the Kansas House of Representatives in 1978. He was re-elected in 1980, ultimately serving two terms in the House. In 1982, he left the House to attend the University of Kansas School of Law, and was elected to the Kansas State Senate from the 30th district in 1984.

Yost served two terms in the state senate, and served as senate vice president for four years. He made an unsuccessful run for Kansas's 4th congressional district in 1992.

In 1996, Yost was elected as a district judge for Sedgwick County and spent nearly two decades there, leaving his judgeship in 2015 to become county counselor for Sedgwick County.

In 2018, disputes erupted over a Federal Bureau of Investigation inquiry into alleged illegal behavior by several county commissioners regarding the firing of County Manager Mike Scholes. Yost was accused of violating attorney-client confidentiality when he warned Scholes that he was being fired for an illegal reason. Yost resigned soon thereafter as county counselor.

After leaving the county, Yost spent several years as a mediator, and was assigned cases by local judges to investigate and to make recommendations to the court. In 2024, Yost decided to run for district judge again in Sedgwick County, and was unopposed. Yost was sworn in for his sixth term as district judge in January, 2025, and is currently serving in the criminal department of the 18th Judicial District.
