= Thomas Robinett =

American politician (born 1949)

Member of the Kansas House of Representatives from the 29th district
- In office 1993–1994
- Preceded by: Robert Vancrum
- Succeeded by: Dennis Wilson

Personal details
- Born: June 21, 1949 (age 77)
- Party: Republican

Thomas A. Robinett Jr. (born June 21, 1949) is an American politician who served in the Kansas House of Representatives as a Republican from the 29th district for one term, in 1993 and 1994.
