= Ty Masterson =

American politician (born 1969)

President of the Kansas Senate
- Incumbent
- Assumed office January 11, 2021
- Preceded by: Susan Wagle

Member of the Kansas Senate from the 16th district
- Incumbent
- Assumed office January 12, 2009
- Preceded by: Peggy Palmer

Member of the Kansas House of Representatives from the 99th district
- In office October 28, 2005 – January 12, 2009
- Preceded by: Todd Novascone
- Succeeded by: Aaron Jack

Personal details
- Born: September 23, 1969 (age 57) El Dorado, Kansas, U.S.
- Party: Republican
- Spouse: Marlo Masterson
- Children: 6
- Education: Kansas State University (dropped out)
- Website: State senate website Campaign website

Ty Masterson (born September 23, 1969) is an American politician and businessman who is the president of the Kansas Senate. A member of the Republican Party, he has represented the 16th district since 2009. From 2005 to 2008, he was a representative in the Kansas House of Representatives. He is a State senator from Andover, where he lives, and served on the Andover City Council.

Masterson was the Republican nominee in the 2026 Kansas gubernatorial election. He lost to Democratic nominee Cindy Holscher in a close race, which was widely expected to be a pickup for the GOP.

== Early life and education ==
Masterson was born on September 23, 1969 in El Dorado, Kansas. He attended Kansas State University for two years before he dropped out and moved to Wichita, Kansas to start his career as a small business owner, contractor, realtor, and a developer before he entered politics.

== Committee assignments ==
Masterson serves on these legislative committees:

- Federal and State Affairs
- Public Health and Welfare
- Utilities

== 2026 Kansas gubernatorial campaign ==
Masterson was the Republican nominee in the 2026 gubernatorial election in Kansas, and was endorsed by President Donald Trump.

On election night, the gubernatorial race against Cindy Holscher was too close to call by the AP. On November 12th, the race was called for Holscher to win Kansas, and Masterson was defeated, keeping it in democratic hands.

== Personal life ==
Masterson filed for bankruptcy in 2011 after his construction business went under.

== Electoral history ==
2012 Kansas Senate election, District 16
Party	Candidate	Votes	%
Republican	Ty Masterson (incumbent)	23,354	100
Total votes		23,354	100
Republican hold			

2016 Kansas Senate election, District 16
Primary election
Party	Candidate	Votes	%
Republican	Ty Masterson (incumbent)	4,697	59.3
Republican	Troy Tabor II	3,226	40.7
Total votes		7,923	100
General election
Republican	Ty Masterson (incumbent)	20,980	64.7
Democratic	Gabriel Costilla	11,467	35.3
Total votes		32,447	100
Republican hold			

2020 Kansas Senate election, District 16
Party	Candidate	Votes	%
Republican	Ty Masterson (incumbent)	27,199	69.0
Democratic	Timothy Fry II	12,246	31.0
Total votes		39,445	100
Republican hold			

2024 Kansas Senate District 16 Republican primary
Party	Candidate	Votes	%
Republican	Ty Masterson (incumbent)	3,972	100.00
Total votes		3,972	100.00

2024 Kansas Senate District 16 general election
Party	Candidate	Votes	%
Republican	Ty Masterson (incumbent)	25,347	65.59
Democratic	Sasha Islam	13,300	34.41
Total votes		38,647	100.00
Republican hold			

2026 Kansas gubernatorial election, Republican primary results
Party	Candidate	Votes	%
Republican	Ty Masterson Jeff Klemp	147,213	43.2
Republican	Philip Sarnecki Joy Eakins	76,292	22.4
Republican	Vicki Schmidt Joe Newland	46,693	13.7
Republican	Scott Schwab Ken Rahjes	37,318	10.9
Republican	Charlotte O'Hara Michelle Dombrosky	14,493	4.3
Republican	Stacy Rogers Michael Smith	11,789	3.5
Republican	Nick Reinecker Katy Reinecker	7,122	2.1
Total votes		340,920	100.0

Political offices
Preceded by Susan Wagle	President of the Kansas Senate; 2021–present	Incumbent
Party political offices
Preceded by Derek Schmidt	Republican nominee for Governor of Kansas; 2026	Most recent
