= Deena Horst =

American politician

Member of the Kansas House of Representatives from the 69th district
- In office 1995–2010
- Succeeded by: Tom Arpke

Personal details
- Born: February 14, 1944 (age 82)
- Party: Republican
- Education: Kansas State Teachers College (BSE); Emporia State University (MA

Deena Horst (born February 14, 1944) is a Republican former member of the Kansas House of Representatives, representing the 69th district. She served from 1995 until 2010, when she was defeated in a primary by Tom Arpke, who would win the seat in the general election.

Horst currently serves on the Kansas Board of Education, representing district 6, after defeating Salina Democrat Carol Viar in the 2012 general election. She has also served as Precinct Committee Woman for the Saline County Kansas Republican Party, and has previously worked as secretary for the Saline County Republican Party Central Committee.

A teacher by profession, she has been an Art Teacher/Department Chair with Unified School District 305, South Middle School, Salina, Kansas since 1968. Horst has a BSE from Kansas State Teachers College, an MA from Emporia State University, and is currently working towards her EdD at Kansas State University.

== Issue positions ==
On July 22, 2020, Horst serving as Kansas State Board of Education District 6 member cast a vote that blocked Governor Laura Kelly's order, precipitated by the COVID-19 pandemic, to keep public schools closed until after Labor Day, at such later time as state health authorities believed primary and secondary schools could safely resume classroom education. The tied vote effectively overrode the governor's order. It also drew Horst a primary write-in opponent shortly in a race where she had not face a primary or general election candidate.

== Committee membership ==
- Education (Vice-chair)
- Higher Education
- Elections
- Aging and Long Term Care
- Joint Committee on Arts and Cultural Resources (chair)

== Major donors ==
Horst raised $21,585 in 2010. The top five donors to Horst's 2008 campaign:

- 1. Saline County Republican Central Cmte $1,005
- 2. Kansas Contractors Assoc. $1,000
- 3. Kansas Realtors Assoc. $900
- 4. Kansas Optometric Assoc. $750
- 5. Kansas Assoc of Insurance Agents $600

Horst raised $11,031 in 2010.The top five donors to Horst's 2010 campaign:

- 1. Kansas Farm Bureau $500
- 2. Kansas Optometric Association $500
- 3. Graves, Hl $500
- 4. Blue Beacon Intnl $500
- 5. Kansas Livestock Association $500

Horst raised $8,809 in 2012. The top five donors to Horst's 2012 campaign:

- 1. Horst, Deena $3,000
- 2. Horst, Deena L. $3,000
- 3. Graves, Helen $500
- 4. Geary County Republican Central Cmte $250
- 5. Blue Beacon International $250

== See also ==
- 2020 Kansas elections
