= Larry Hibbard =

American politician (1945–2026)

Member of the Kansas House of Representatives from the 13th district
- In office January 14, 2013 – July 13, 2019
- Preceded by: Forrest Knox
- Succeeded by: Joe Newland

Personal details
- Born: September 14, 1945 Toronto, Kansas, U.S.
- Died: October 18, 2026 (aged 81) Fredonia, Kansas, U.S.
- Party: Republican
- Spouse: Cynthia Hibbard
- Education: Kansas State University
- Profession: Rancher/Representative

Larry Paul Hibbard (September 14, 1945 – October 18, 2026) was an American politician who was a Republican member of the Kansas House of Representatives, representing the 13th district (Toronto in Woodson County) from 2013 to 2019.

Hibbard resigned from the House on July 13, 2019, for health reasons. He died in hospital in Fredonia, Kansas, on October 18, 2026, at the age of 81.
