= John Vratil =

American politician

Member of the Kansas Senate from the 11th district
- In office November 16, 1998 – January 14, 2013
- Preceded by: Keith Schraad
- Succeeded by: Jeff Melcher

Personal details
- Born: October 28, 1945 (age 80) Great Bend, Kansas, U.S.
- Party: Republican
- Spouse: Teresa
- Children: 4
- Education: University of Exeter; University of Kansas School of Law (BS); University of Southampton; University of Kansas (BS)

John Vratil (October 28, 1945) is a former Republican member of the Kansas Senate, representing the 11th district from 1998 to 2013. He was the Senate Vice-President from 2003 to 2013.

== Electoral history ==
Vratil was appointed to fill the seat left vacant by the resignation of Keith Schraad. He was elected in his own right in 2000, and won re-election in 2004 and 2008.

== Committee assignments ==
Vratil served on these legislative committees:

- Education (vice-chair)
- Ways and Means (vice-chair)
- Interstate Cooperation
- Judiciary
- Organization, Calendar and Rules
- Joint Committee on State-Tribal Relations

== Major donors ==
Some of the top contributors to Vratil's 2008 campaign, according to the National Institute on Money in State Politics:

Kansas Association of Realtors, Kansas Medical Society, Hallmark Cards, Kansas Republican Senatorial Committee, Kansas Contractors Association, and others

Finance, insurance and real estate companies were his largest donor group.
