= Rick Kloos =

American politician

Member of the Kansas Senate from the 19th district
- Incumbent
- Assumed office January 11, 2021
- Preceded by: Anthony Hensley

Personal details
- Born: Richard Gene Kloos; July 26, 1966 (age 59) Miltonvale, Kansas, U.S.
- Party: Republican
- Spouse: Pennie Kloos
- Children: 4
- Education: Trinity College, Ellendale, North Dakota (BA)
- Website: Official website

Richard Gene Kloos (born July 26, 1966) is a Republican member of the Kansas Senate, representing the 19th district, which covers Topeka and eastern Shawnee County, western Douglas County and all of Osage County and Jefferson County. On November 3, 2020, he defeated Anthony Hensley, who had been holding office in the Kansas statehouse for 44 years, by 51.2% to 48.8%.

== Career ==
In June 2009, Rick started God's Storehouse in Topeka, Kansas, a non-profit, community thrift store with over 80 employees.

=== 2018 Kansas Governor campaign ===
Kloos ran as an Independent for governor, on a ticket with his son, Nathaniel, running for lieutenant governor. They finished last, in 5th place in the general election, with 6,584 votes, 0.6% of the total.

=== 2020 Kansas 19th Senate district campaign ===
Kloos ran unchallenged in the GOP primary; however, he received 6,758 in the primary. He beat Anthony Hensley 16,141 votes to 15,383 votes, 51% to 49%, in the November 3, 2020 general election—in what Titus Wu of the Topeka Capitol-Journal has called "a huge upset victory". Hensley had at least three times the campaign budget that Kloos had. Kloos opposes abortion and was endorsed by Kansans for Life. Hensley had represented the area for 44 years as either the state representative or state senator. The Kloos campaign outraised Hensley $37,433 to $1,286.

== Personal life ==
Kloos and his wife Pennie have been married for 34 years and have lived in Berryton, Kansas for 22 years. They have four grown boys, along with seven grandchildren.
