= Brenda Dietrich =

American politician

Member of the Kansas Senate from the 20th district
- Incumbent
- Assumed office January 11, 2021
- Preceded by: Eric Rucker

Member of the Kansas House of Representatives from the 52nd district
- In office January 9, 2017 – January 11, 2021
- Preceded by: Dick Jones
- Succeeded by: Jesse Borjon

Personal details
- Born: May 16, 1953 (age 73) Colby, Kansas, U.S.
- Party: Republican
- Spouse: Jerry
- Children: 1
- Education: Kansas State University; University of Missouri–Kansas City

Brenda S. Dietrich (born May 16, 1953) is an American politician who served as a member of the Kansas House of Representatives for the 52nd district from 2017 to 2021. Prior to joining politics, she spent 40 years in education, serving as the superintendent of Auburn–Washburn USD 437 from 2001-2015.
