= Kansas's 16th Senate district =

American legislative district

Kansas's 16th State Senate district
Senator
Ty Masterson; R–Andover
- Demographics: 82% White; 4% Black; 6% Hispanic; 5% Asian; 2% Other
- Population (2018): 76,678

Kansas's 16th Senate district is one of 40 districts in the Kansas Senate. It has been represented by Republican Ty Masterson since 2009.

== Geography ==
District 16 covers the eastern suburbs of Wichita in Butler and Sedgwick Counties, including the communities of Andover, Augusta, Rose Hill, and parts of Derby, Bel Aire, Kechi, and Wichita proper.

The district is located entirely within Kansas's 4th congressional district, and overlaps with the 72nd, 75th, 77th, 81st, 82nd, 85th, 88th, 90th, and 99th districts of the Kansas House of Representatives.

== Recent election results ==
=== 2020 ===
2020 Kansas Senate election, District 16
Party	Candidate	Votes	%
Republican	Ty Masterson (incumbent)	27,199	69.0
Democratic	Timothy Fry II	12,246	31.0
Total votes		39,445	100
Republican hold			

=== 2016 ===
2016 Kansas Senate election, District 16
Primary election
Party	Candidate	Votes	%
Republican	Ty Masterson (incumbent)	4,697	59.3
Republican	Troy Tabor II	3,226	40.7
Total votes		7,923	100
General election
Republican	Ty Masterson (incumbent)	20,980	64.7
Democratic	Gabriel Costilla	11,467	35.3
Total votes		32,447	100
Republican hold			

=== 2012 ===
2012 Kansas Senate election, District 16
Party	Candidate	Votes	%
Republican	Ty Masterson (incumbent)	23,354	100
Total votes		23,354	100
Republican hold			

=== Federal and statewide results ===
Year	Office	Results
2020	President	Trump 63 – 34.6%
2018	Governor	Kobach 50.4 – 40.3%
2016	President	Trump 64.9 – 28.4%
2012	President	Romney 68.8 – 29.2%
