= Jeff King (politician) =

American politician (born 1975)

Member of the Kansas Senate from the 15th district
- In office January 10, 2011 – January 10, 2017
- Preceded by: Derek Schmidt
- Succeeded by: Dan Goddard

Member of the Kansas House of Representatives from the 12th district
- In office January 8, 2007 – January 10, 2011
- Preceded by: Frank C. Miller
- Succeeded by: Jim Kelly

Personal details
- Born: May 15, 1975 (age 51) Independence, Kansas, U.S.
- Party: Republican
- Education: Brown University (BA); University of Cambridge (MSc); Yale University (JD)

Jeffrey "Jeff" R. King (born May 15, 1975) is a former Republican member of the Kansas Senate, representing residents of Allen, Woodson, Anderson, Franklin, Coffey, Wilson, Montgomery, Elk, and Chautauqua counties in the 15th Senate district from 2011 until 2017. He was appointed to fill the unexpired term of Derek Schmidt in the Kansas Senate 15th district, following Schmidt's election as Kansas Attorney General. King assumed office in the Kansas Senate on January 10, 2011, resigning from the House, effective the same day. He previously served in the Kansas House of Representatives, first holding office in 2007. In 2016, the American Conservative Union gave him a lifetime evaluation of 79%.

King earned his Bachelor of Arts in international relations and economy from Brown University, Master of Science in agricultural economics from Cambridge University, and J.D. from Yale Law School.

Prior to his election he has worked for the U.S. Department of Agriculture, as a private practice attorney, and as a law clerk for Chief Judge Deanell Reece Tacha on the U.S. Court of Appeals for the Tenth Circuit.

== Committee membership ==
Senator King served on the following legislative committees:

- Confirmation Oversight
- Corrections and Juvenile Justice
- Interstate Cooperation
- Joint Committee on Prisons, Investments, and Benefits (Vice-chair)
- Judiciary
- Senate Select Committee on Kansas Public Employees Retirement System (KPERS) (Chair)
- Transportation

== Major donors ==
The top 5 donors to King's 2008 campaign were from professional organizations:

- 1. Kansas Medical Society $1,250
- 2. Kansans for Lifesaving Cures $1,000
- 3. Koch Industries $1,000
- 4. Kansas Contractors Assoc $1,000
- 5. Kansas Insurance Agents $600
