= Tom Arpke =

American politician

Member of the Kansas Senate from the 24th district
- In office January 9, 2013 – January 10, 2017
- Preceded by: Pete Brungardt
- Succeeded by: Randall Hardy

Member of the Kansas House of Representatives from the 69th district
- In office January 10, 2011 – January 9, 2013
- Preceded by: Deena Horst
- Succeeded by: J. R. Claeys

Personal details
- Born: February 6, 1952 (age 74) El Paso, Texas, U.S.
- Party: Republican
- Spouse: Beth Arpke
- Children: 5
- Education: Florida State University
- Profession: Travel agent, consultant

Tom Arpke (born February 6, 1952) is a former Republican member of the Kansas Senate, representing the 24th district from 2013 to 2017. The American Conservative Union gave him a lifetime rating of 84%.

Arpke is a Salina travel agent and consultant, and holds a Bachelor of Science degree in microbiology from Florida State University. He and his wife, Beth, have five children including Kellan Arpke, who is a Lieutenant in the United States Navy. Arpke was elected to the Kansas House in 2010 and filed for the Senate race in 2012.

== Elections ==
=== 2009 ===
Arpke was elected to the Salina city commission in 2009, receiving a total of 2,386 votes, winning by 332.

=== 2010 ===
Arpke defeated incumbent Deena Horst in the House District 69 Republican primary on August 3, 2010 by a margin of 1,205-898. Horst was seeking her ninth term. He defeated Gerrett Morris (D) in the general election on November 2, 2010, by 3,733 to 2,106 votes.

=== 2012 ===
Arpke defeated incumbent Pete Brungardt in the Republican Senate primary on August 7, 2012 by a 5,413-4,354 margin. He defeated Democratic nominee Janice Norlin in the 2012 general election.

=== 2016 ===
Arpke lost the Republican primary to Randall R. Hardy, when he ran for reelection to the state senate.

== Committee assignments ==
Sen. Arpke served on these legislative committees:

- Ways and Means
- Education (vice-chairman)
- Natural Resources
- Legislative Educational Planning Committee

== Major donors ==
Some of the top contributors to Arpke's 2012 campaign, according to Project Vote Smart:

- Kansas Chamber of Commerce, $2,818
- Koch Industries, $2,000
- American Freedom PAC, $2,000

In addition, a number of contributors gave $1,000 each.
