= Richard Proehl =

American politician

Member of the Kansas House of Representatives from the 7th district
- In office December 21, 2005 – January 9, 2023
- Preceded by: Jeffry L. Jack
- Succeeded by: Dan Goddard

Personal details
- Born: November 6, 1944 (age 81) Emporia, Kansas
- Party: Republican
- Spouse: Linda
- Education: Kansas State University

Richard Proehl (born November 6, 1944) is an American politician who served as a Republican member of the Kansas House of Representatives, representing the 7th district (Parsons in Labette County) until January 9, 2023. He was elected to his first term on December 21, 2005. He did not seek re-election in 2022.

Proehl received his bachelor's and master's degrees from Kansas State University and had worked in the banking industry for 35 years.

He has been active with a number of community organizations, including the Parsons Chamber of Commerce, Veterans of Foreign Wars, Lions Club, Red Cross, and the American Legion.

== Committee membership ==
- Financial Institutions (Vice-Chair)
- Energy and Utilities
- Insurance
- Transportation

== Major donors ==
The top 5 donors to Proehl's 2008 campaign were mostly professional associations:

- 1. Kansas Contractors Assoc $1,000
- 2. AT&T $750
- 3. Kansans for Lifesaving Cures $750
- 4. Kansas Bankers Assoc $600
- 5. Kansas Assoc of Realtors $500
