= Barbara Lawrence (politician) =

American politician (born 1934)

Member of the Kansas Senate from the 30th district
- In office 1993 – January 8, 2001
- Preceded by: Eric Yost
- Succeeded by: Susan Wagle

Member of the Kansas House of Representatives from the 84th district
- In office 1989–1992

Personal details
- Born: July 17, 1934 (age 92) Emporia, Kansas, U.S.
- Party: Republican

Barbara Lawrence (born July 17, 1934) is an American former politician who served as a Republican in the Kansas House of Representatives and Kansas State Senate.

Lawrence was born in Emporia, Kansas and resided in Wichita, Kansas as an adult. She was elected to the Kansas House in 1988 and re-elected in 1990; in 1992, she ascended to the Kansas Senate and served two terms there, winning re-election in 1996. During her last term in the Kansas House, she worked with fellow representative Susan Wagle on legislation that would lower property taxes; however, the bill failed to advance. In addition to her state legislature service, Lawrence also worked as a schoolteacher.
