= Stanley Clarke (disambiguation) =

Stanley Clarke (born 1951) is an American jazz bassist and film composer.

Stanley Clarke may also refer to:

- Stanley Clarke (swimmer) (born 1939), English swimmer
- Stanley Clarke (businessman) (1933–2004), English businessman, property developer, horse racing enthusiast, and philanthropist
- Stanley Calvert Clarke (died 1911), British Army officer and courtier
- Stanley E. Clarke III, United States Air Force general
- Stan Clarke (born 1960), pitcher in Major League Baseball
- Stanley Clarke (album), a 1974 album by Stanley Clarke

== See also ==
- Stan Clark (disambiguation)
