= Renee Erickson (politician) =

American politician

Member of the Kansas Senate from the 30th district
- Incumbent
- Assumed office January 11, 2021
- Preceded by: Susan Wagle

Member of the Kansas House of Representatives from the 87th district
- In office January 15, 2019 – January 11, 2021
- Preceded by: Roger Elliott
- Succeeded by: Susan Estes

Personal details
- Born: May 23, 1964 (age 62) Newton, Kansas, U.S.
- Party: Republican
- Children: 2
- Education: Oklahoma Christian University (BS); Wichita State University (BA); Kansas State University (MS)
- Website: Official website Campaign website

Renee Kendra Erickson (born May 23, 1964) is an American school principal and politician from the state of Kansas. A Republican, Erickson represented the 87th district of the Kansas House of Representatives, based in eastern Wichita, from 2019 to 2020. In 2020, she successfully ran for the Kansas Senate, where she represents the 30th Senate district for a term ending in 2024.

== Career ==
In 2016, Erickson – then a middle school principal and a former financial planner – announced her campaign for the 31st district of the Kansas Senate, challenging incumbent Republican Carolyn McGinn from the right. Erickson narrowly lost in the primary election, 49-51%.

Erickson ran for the state legislature again in 2018, after 87th district incumbent Roger Elliott retired. She positioned herself as the conservative in the race and defeated Jeff Kennedy in the Republican primary and was uncontested in the general election.

President of the Kansas Senate Susan Wagle announced her retirement from the 30th district in 2020, and endorsed Erickson as her successor; Erickson faced Democrat Melissa Gregory in November and defeated her 52% to 48%.

== Political positions ==
=== Healthcare ===
Erickson opposes expanding Medicaid.

=== COVID-19 ===
Erickson has posted on social media that she has refused to wear a mask during the COVID-19 pandemic. She has also criticized that businesses are requiring face masks for entrance.

In May 2020, Erickson voted to strip Governor Laura Kelly of her power to enact policies in response to COVID-19.

=== LGBTQ ===
Erickson introduced the controversial Fairness in Women's Sports bill (SB 55) to the Kansas Legislature during the 2021 legislative session. The bill would prohibit individuals who are not biologically female from competing in girls' and women's sports. Erickson claims the bill is important to protect female athletes.

== Personal life ==
Erickson lives in Wichita with her husband, who is also a retired school principal. They have two children and one grandchild.
