= Kansas's 20th Senate district =

American legislative district

Kansas's 20th State Senate district
Senator
Brenda Dietrich; R–Topeka
- Demographics: 81% White; 5% Black; 7% Hispanic; 2% Asian; 1% Native American; 3% Other
- Population (2018): 73,035

Kansas's 20th Senate district is one of 40 districts in the Kansas Senate. It has been represented by Republican Eric Rucker since his appointment in 2018 to replace fellow Republican Vicki Schmidt; Rucker was defeated in the 2020 primary election by State Representative Brenda Dietrich.

== Geography ==
District 20 is based in southern Topeka, also stretching to cover sparsely populated portions of Shawnee and Wabaunsee Counties.

The district is located almost entirely within Kansas's 2nd congressional district, with a small portion extending into the 1st district. It overlaps with the 50th, 51st, 52nd, 53rd, 54th, 55th, and 56th districts of the Kansas House of Representatives.

== Recent election results ==
=== 2020 ===
In 2018, incumbent Vicki Schmidt was elected Kansas Insurance Commissioner, and Assistant Secretary of State Eric Rucker was chosen to replace her.

2020 Kansas Senate election, District 20
Primary election
Party	Candidate	Votes	%
Republican	Brenda Dietrich	6,509	54.4
Republican	Eric Rucker (incumbent)	5,451	45.6
Total votes		11,960	100
General election
Republican	Brenda Dietrich	22,000	56.9
Democratic	Rachel Willis	16,696	43.1
Total votes		38,696	100
Republican hold			

=== 2016 ===
2016 Kansas Senate election, District 20
Primary election
Party	Candidate	Votes	%
Republican	Vicki Schmidt (incumbent)	5,853	53.4
Republican	Joe Patton	5,110	46.6
Total votes		10,963	100
Democratic	Candace Ayars	1,755	46.8
Democratic	Dennis Rogers	1,005	26.8
Democratic	Rick Munoz Cortez	760	20.3
Democratic	Clarence Hinchey	230	6.1
Total votes		3,750	100
General election
Republican	Vicki Schmidt (incumbent)	22,216	65.4
Democratic	Candace Ayars	11,775	34.6
Total votes		33,991	100
Republican hold			

=== 2012 ===
2012 Kansas Senate election, District 20
Primary election
Party	Candidate	Votes	%
Republican	Vicki Schmidt (incumbent)	5,747	50.7
Republican	Joe Patton	5,587	49.3
Total votes		11,334	100
General election
Republican	Vicki Schmidt (incumbent)	21,359	63.9
Democratic	Terry Crowder	10,071	30.1
Libertarian	Clarence Hinchey	2,003	6.0
Total votes		33,433	100
Republican hold			

=== Federal and statewide results ===
Year	Office	Results
2020	President	Biden 49.2 – 48.1%
2018	Governor	Kelly 56.2 – 35.8%
2016	President	Trump 49.6 – 43.5%
2012	President	Romney 53.9 – 44.1%
