= Susan Wagle =

American politician from Kansas (born 1953)

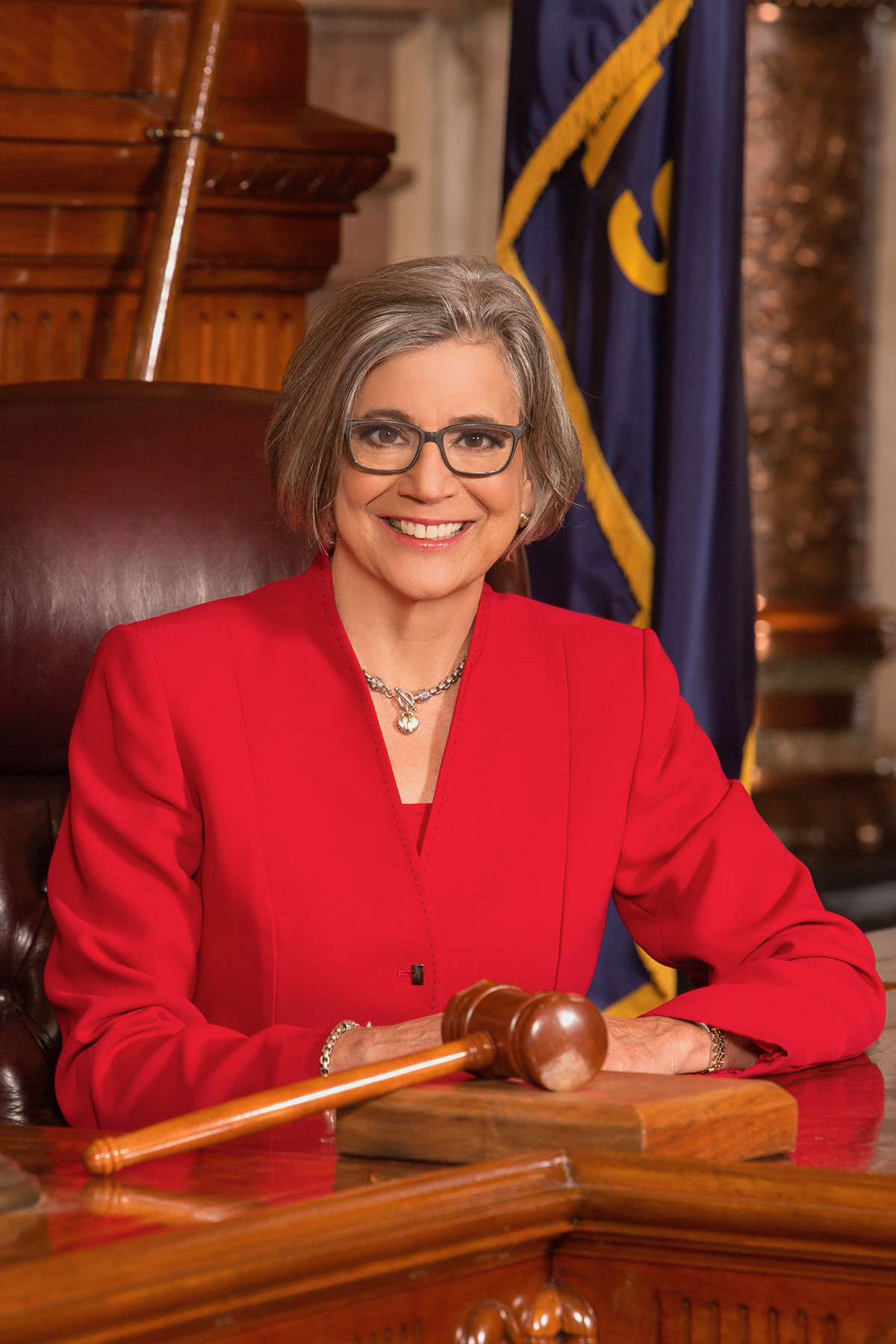

President of the Kansas Senate
- In office January 14, 2012 – January 11, 2021
- Preceded by: Stephen Morris
- Succeeded by: Ty Masterson

Member of the Kansas Senate from the 30th district
- In office January 8, 2001 – January 11, 2021
- Preceded by: Barbara Lawrence
- Succeeded by: Renee Erickson

Member of the Kansas House of Representatives from the 99th district
- In office January 14, 1991 – January 8, 2001
- Preceded by: Ellen Samuelson
- Succeeded by: Todd Novascone

Personal details
- Born: September 27, 1953 (age 73) Allentown, Pennsylvania, U.S.
- Party: Republican
- Spouse: Tom Wagle
- Children: 4
- Education: Wichita State University (BA)

Susan Wagle (born September 27, 1953) is an American politician who served as a Republican member of the Kansas Senate, representing the 30th district from 2001 to 2021. She was elected Kansas Senate President in 2013 and was reelected in 2017. She is the first woman to hold this position.

== Early life and education ==
Wagle graduated cum laude from Wichita State University in 1979 with a degree in elementary education. She taught special education in Wichita public schools from 1979 until 1982. While teaching, she developed a program called “Jogging out the Jitters” after discovering that intense physical activity helped hyperactive special-needs students improve academic performance and reduce mood swings. The program received local attention in the Wichita Eagle-Beacon.

In 1982 she left teaching to help her husband, Tom, with his real estate business.

Wagle's interest in politics "evolved over time" and was not initially present; she "never, ever thought about running for office." Personal experiences shaped her decision: during her first marriage she received pregnancy counseling at a clinic associated with third-trimester abortions, which troubled her as staff "really tried to talk [her] into an abortion." In the late 1980s, changes to property-tax classification and reappraisal led to "mammoth" increases (e.g., tripling annual bills for small real-estate investments from $5,000 to $15,000), making it difficult to pass costs to clients. Additionally, new bingo legislation reduced operating days from seven to three per week, negatively affecting a bingo hall they owned. These events, combined with constituent frustration, highlighted "the impact that government could have on a family, on a business," prompting friends and her husband Tom to encourage her run.

== Kansas House of Representatives (1991–2001) ==
In 1989 the Kansas Legislature changed the method of property-tax assessment, resulting in drastic increases in property-tax bills for many Kansans. Friends and business colleagues urged Wagle to run for the Kansas House of Representatives to address the issue.

She received the endorsement of the Wichita Eagle, which described her as a former teacher who supported merit pay and workplace-skill improvements and noted that as a real-estate investor she was “well aware” of the property-tax problems facing Kansans. Wagle won the election and was sworn into office in January 1991.

In 1993 First Lady Hillary Clinton proposed a national health-care plan that became known as “HillaryCare.” The plan faced strong opposition from conservatives and the health-care industry. Wagle worked with high-profile health-care leaders and former Vice President Dan Quayle to oppose the plan in Kansas, hoping to demonstrate its unpopularity to Senate Majority Leader Bob Dole. For her efforts promoting tax-free health-care savings accounts as a solution to the affordability crisis, the American Legislative Exchange Council (ALEC) named her “Outstanding Legislator of the Year” in 1994 and nominated her to serve on its board of directors.

In 1994 Wagle was elected Speaker Pro Tem of the Kansas House, becoming the first woman to hold that position.

=== Cancer diagnosis ===
On April 24, 1996, at age 42, Wagle told her colleagues on the House floor that she had been diagnosed with end-stage non-Hodgkin lymphoma by three institutions, including the Mayo Clinic. Doctors advised her to delay treatment until the tumors pressed on her nerves, as the disease was considered incurable at the time. In her speech she drew comfort from Psalm 139, stating that God had created her and would care for her and her children. She told her colleagues, “Cancer will not take me one day earlier, or one moment earlier, than that time he has planned for me,” and announced that she would run for re-election because she “believed in miracles.”

After the announcement she received messages from churches and individuals across Kansas saying she was on their prayer lists. She changed her diet, eating less meat and more vegetables and fruits. Five months later she announced she was in unexpected remission. At the time, life expectancy for stage-4 non-Hodgkin lymphoma patients was eight to ten years.

Wagle won re-election in her district and was re-elected to her leadership position in the House in 1996. In January 1998, after being ranked on a list of the state’s top “earthmovers” in a political poll, she announced she would run for Speaker of the House. She narrowly lost the leadership election and was appointed chair of the House Tax Committee by the new Speaker.

As tax committee chair, Wagle launched an investigation into Kansas Attorney General Carla Stovall’s decision to hire her former two-person law firm to represent the state in the national Big Tobacco lawsuit, which was expected to bring the small firm $27 million. The committee sent the issue to the House floor to challenge the contract, but the Speaker chose not to bring the bill to a vote.

Wagle served on committees including Taxation (which she chaired after her Speaker Pro Tem role and described as her favorite), Public Health and Welfare, Economic Development, and others. She co-sponsored early efforts with Representative Barbara Lawrence to reduce property taxes and eliminate the state sales tax on groceries, responding to "tremendous anger" from constituents over reappraisal impacts.

Following the deadly 1991 Andover tornado (which affected her district, destroying schools, a church, and trailer parks), she sponsored legislation requiring storm shelters in mobile home parks to support community recovery and safety.

In 1997 she authored Kansas's first major pro-life legislation, the Woman's Right to Know Act, which required a 24-hour waiting period and provision of fetal development information. Despite a pro-choice legislative majority, she negotiated its passage with pro-choice Senator Sandy Praeger, describing it as "an example of passing a bill where pro-lifers would have wanted more, and the pro-choice community didn’t want it at all, but we did what was right for the community." The bill remains law.

She co-sponsored restrictions on corporate hog farming, mandating county commission approval and protections against groundwater seepage. Wagle also opposed a proposed landfill near Furley in her district, helping relocate it.

As Public Health and Welfare Committee chair, she exposed oversight failures at the Kansas Board of Healing Arts related to an opioid "pill mill" (linked to 67 deaths in Haysville). Her efforts led to a unanimous resolution (125–0 in the House, 40–0 in the Senate) resulting in the firing of the board's director and attorney to improve public protection.

== Kansas Senate (2001–2021) ==
In 2000 Wagle ran for the Kansas Senate and defeated high-profile opponents in both the primary and general election.

In September 2001 her youngest son, Paul, was diagnosed with acute lymphocytic leukemia. She and her family prioritized supporting him through two and a half years of chemotherapy. In 2004 Paul relapsed and was transferred to Cook Children’s Hospital in Fort Worth, Texas, for an experimental umbilical-cord stem-cell transplant trial. He remained in Texas for nine months. The Kansas Senate accommodated her by holding votes only one day a week so she could travel back for sessions while caring for her son. She was re-elected to the Senate in 2005.

In 2006 ALEC appointed Wagle its national chairwoman. In that capacity she led a delegation to London to present former British Prime Minister Margaret Thatcher with ALEC’s International Pioneer Award, recognizing Thatcher’s legacy of lowering taxes and embracing privatization that propelled Britain’s economic prosperity.

As chair of the Senate Health Care Strategies Committee in 2008, Wagle invited former Kansas Attorney General Bob Stephan, a cancer survivor, to testify in support of the Medical Marijuana Defense Act, which would have allowed legitimate medical-marijuana patients to raise their medical use as a defense to prosecution. The committee did not have the votes to advance the bill, and no further action was taken.

In February 2011, as chair of the Senate Commerce Committee, Wagle held hearings on the Kansas Bioscience Authority, a state-funded public-private partnership intended to bring biotech jobs to Kansas. She expressed concern about high executive salaries and bonuses (the CEO earned four times the governor’s salary) and poor outcomes. She requested an independent audit. After the audit revealed misspent taxpayer funds, and after the agency had spent $232 million, Governor Sam Brownback and legislative leaders sold the authority’s investment portfolio to a Chicago firm for $14 million. Wagle stated, “I think when you give taxpayer money to a group of people with no oversight, oftentimes the group can get carried away because there’s no accountability.”

Wagle was treated for non-Hodgkin lymphoma a third time in spring 2012. By fall she was again in complete remission. In December 2012 she became the first woman and first Wichitan elected Senate President. After her election she stated, “I know there are an awful lot of people who are looking for a reason to live right now, a reason to go that extra step. Do what you have to do, and fight for life.” She was re-elected Senate President in November 2016.

In October 2017, after The Hill and local outlets reported complaints of sexual harassment by staffers in the Kansas Statehouse, Senate President Wagle requested that the Women’s Foundation of Greater Kansas City provide recommendations to the Legislative Leaders Council. The recommendations were adopted, resulting in mandatory harassment training for legislators and expanded reporting options for all employees and visitors in the State Capitol.

Elected Senate President in December 2012, Wagle became the first woman to hold the position and the first from Wichita; she served two terms until 2020. She emphasized inclusive leadership: "Everyone has a voice. Don’t ever cut off debate. Always work across the aisle... make the tent bigger, not smaller." She viewed compromise positively: "Compromise is not a dirty word. Compromise is the way you accomplish things for people."

She pushed ethics reforms requiring lobbyist-style registration, disclosure for those seeking state contracts, and competitive bidding/transparency in processes like tobacco litigation contracts.

Wagle credited her longevity (30 years total in the legislature) to listening to constituents on taxation, quality of life, and education, and bringing transparency to government processes.

== 2020 U.S. Senate campaign and retirement ==
In July 2019 Wagle announced her candidacy for the U.S. Senate seat being vacated by retiring Senator Pat Roberts.

In August 2019, after touring border and immigration facilities, she wrote an editorial advocating that Congress pass a funding package for a border wall and enhanced border security to stop cartels, while also implementing a legal work-visa program.

Wagle made affordable, quality health care a centerpiece of her campaign, citing her own cancer experiences and those of three of her children.

In January 2020 a public-health emergency was declared due to COVID-19. As Senate President, Wagle worked to keep Governor Laura Kelly’s emergency shutdown orders balanced so that Kansans who needed to continue earning a living and paying bills could do so.

On March 17, 2020, Wagle’s daughter Julia Scott, a physician and mother of four, died at age 38 from multiple myeloma after her second blood-stem-cell transplant failed. Wagle told reporters she believed the unusually high incidence of cancer in her family (herself and three children) stemmed from an accidental 1980s incident in which an exterminator placed chlordane — a termite-treatment chemical later banned by the FDA in 1988 — into the air ducts of their Wichita home. After inspection, the Kansas Department of Agriculture declared the home a toxic-waste site.

Wagle announced in May 2020 that she was dropping out of the U.S. Senate race. She cited the recent loss of her daughter and her ongoing duties as Senate President during the COVID-19 outbreak as contributing factors. In a later podcast she described 2020 as “the most difficult year of my life” and explained her decision to shift focus to family before retiring from the Kansas Senate in January 2021.

Before retiring, Wagle managed and helped fund the 2020 elections for her Republican caucus. Moderate candidates lost seats while conservative candidates gained. She stated that the results “affirmed Kansans want to thrive in a culture of limited government, opportunity and self-determination; all while respecting life, neighbors, law and order.”

=== Other political involvement ===
Wagle served as a delegate to the 1996 Republican National Convention. She served as National Chairman of the American Legislative Exchange Council (ALEC) in 2006. As of 2019, she was a member of ALEC's Board of Directors.

== Political positions ==
=== Abortion ===
While Wagle identified as pro-choice as a young adult, the experience of pregnancy led her to change her stance. She is considered a staunchly pro-life legislator.

In 2003, Wagle "successfully pushed a bill to require abortion clinics to provide information on human development to women considering an abortion".

In 2015, Wagle sponsored a bill known as the Kansas Unborn Child Protection from Dismemberment Abortion Act. It would have prohibited a person from performing, or attempting to perform, a dismemberment abortion unless it was necessary to preserve the life of the mother. The law was found unconstitutional by the Kansas Supreme Court.

Wagle opposed the confirmation of David Toland as Kansas Secretary of Commerce in 2019. As director of a local non-profit, Tolan had obtained a grant from a charitable fund posthumously named after George Tiller, an assassinated physician who had performed abortions. The grant funding did not relate to abortion; however, Wagle's spokesperson, Shannon Golden, called the relationship with the Tiller fund "concerning". Toland was later confirmed.

In 2020, Wagle linked unblocking passage of a bill to expand Medicare in Kansas to passage of a constitutional amendment that prohibited abortion.

=== Redistricting ===
In October 2020, a video surfaced in which Wagle encouraged Republican donors to help elect a supermajority in the state legislature in advance of redistricting. Like most states, the Kansas legislature draws the congressional and legislative maps. In an attempt to give her party an advantage, Kansas Governor Laura Kelly asked the state legislature to form an independent redistricting commission.

=== Government accountability ===
In 2018, Wagle cosponsored legislation with Kansas Senate Minority Leader Anthony Hensley that worked to bring more transparency to state contracts. The bill required lobbyist registration for anyone attempting to influence officials in state agencies or the executive branch over a state contract. Prior to the enactment of this legislation, lobbying efforts were only required to be disclosed if such efforts were directed toward the legislative branch. Wagle stated the need for this legislation arose due to a lack of transparency within the administration of Republican former Governor Sam Brownback.

As Commerce Committee Chairwoman, Wagle began an investigation into the Kansas Bioscience Authority (KBA) in 2011. The KBA was founded under former Governor Kathleen Sebelius with the goal of spurring growth in the bioscience sector. The KBA had an independent board that approved spending. Wagle called for an investigation due to excessive spending on salaries, benefits, travel, and entertainment. Wagle noticed a stark difference between the state's 12-year investment and its final return. The state had invested $240 million into the KBA. The legislature and Governor Sam Brownback intended to fill budget holes left by massive tax cuts benefitting the wealthiest Kansans by selling the KBA for $25 million and slashing budgets for highways, schools and Medicare. The sale of the authority netted only $14 million. Wagle called for an audit and review for the abuse of taxpayer dollars which ultimately led to the shutdown of KBA for findings of misspent funds. The legislature passed a $1.2 billion tax increase and overrode Brownback's veto of the measure. Wagle cast the deciding vote to override but did not comment on her vote.

=== Medicaid ===
In February 2020, Wagle sought to block the federally-funded expansion of Medicaid by the Kansas legislature out of concern that it would lead to taxpayer funded abortions in the state. She outlined her reasoning in a guest column published in The Wichita Eagle on February 14, 2020.

=== COVID-19 ===
In April 2020, Kelly instituted orders to restrict the rapid spread of COVID-19, limiting public gatherings to a maximum of ten individuals. Since the orders would have applied to Easter Sunday masses, the Republican-majority (5–2) Legislative Coordinating Council (LCC) reversed her orders as applied to church assemblies. Wagle opposed Kelly's orders and supported the Republican attempt to block them, saying that "Governor Kelly’s orders display her misplaced priorities." Of the initial eleven identified sources of contagion in Kansas, three were identified as having come from recent religious gatherings. Forty-four state governors had imposed similar restrictions, with 18 states closing churches completely. As a precedent, Kansas churches had been ordered closed during the 1918–1919 "Spanish Flu" pandemic.

Kansas challenged the LCC's decision in court, saying that the council and Republican state Attorney General Derek Schmidt had "weakened and confused our emergency response efforts, putting every Kansan at risk." The Kansas Supreme Court reinstated Kelly's orders, saying the LCC's reasoning was "flawed," and it did not have the power to overrule the governor.

=== Sexual harassment reform ===
After former Democratic staffer Abbie Hodgson complained about widespread harassment and inappropriate requests from legislators, Wagle said that in five years as senate president, she had never received any such complaints. Subsequently in 2017, Wagle worked to implement changes in sexual harassment policies at the Kansas Capitol. Those changes included mandatory training sessions, anonymous reporting, and protections for interns.

=== Supreme Court appointment process ===
Wagle has expressed disagreement with State Supreme Court decisions and has attempted to change the process for nomination and confirmation of justices. In 2013, Wagle voted with 27 of her colleagues for a constitutional amendment that would change the nomination process for Kansas Supreme Court justices from the existing system in which the Kansas Supreme Court Nominating Commission identifies three candidates, of whom the governor selects one, to the "federal model" where the governor nominates a candidate and the Senate votes to confirm the nominee.

== Personal life ==
Wagle is married to Tom Wagle. The Wagles, who reside in Wichita, have four children, and Susan Wagle has three step-children. As of July 2020, the Wagles had 16 grandchildren.

Wagle survived bouts with cancer in 1995, 2003, and 2012. Her son, Paul, survived leukemia during his childhood. In March 2020, Wagle's daughter, Julia Scott, died from multiple myeloma after a four-year battle with the disease.

Party political offices
Preceded by Dave Lindstrom	Republican nominee for Lieutenant Governor of Kansas; 2006	Succeeded by Jeff Colyer
Political offices
Preceded by Stephen Morris	President of the Kansas Senate; 2013–2021	Succeeded by Ty Masterson
