= Eric Rucker =

American politician

Member of the Kansas Senate from the 20th district
- In office December 14, 2018 – January 11, 2021
- Preceded by: Vicki Schmidt
- Succeeded by: Brenda Dietrich

Personal details
- Party: Republican
- Spouse: Joan
- Education: Kansas Wesleyan University (BA) Emporia State University (MS) Washburn University School of Law (JD)
- Website: Official website

Eric Rucker is an American attorney and politician from the state of Kansas. A Republican, Rucker has represented the 20th district of the Kansas Senate, based in western Topeka, since 2018. He was defeated in the 2020 Republican primary by State Representative Brenda Dietrich.

In 2018, Rucker was appointed to the Senate to succeed fellow Republican Vicki Schmidt, who had been elected Kansas Insurance Commissioner. Rucker had previously served as an Assistant Kansas Secretary of State starting in 2011, and before then as a Shawnee County Commissioner and a Deputy Assistant Secretary of State.

Rucker lives in Topeka with his wife, Joan.

Party political offices
Preceded by Larry "Monty" Montgomery	Republican nominee for Kansas State Treasurer; 1990	Succeeded by Randy Duncan
