= Michael Fagg =

American politician

Member of the Kansas Senate from the 14th district
- Incumbent
- Assumed office January 11, 2021
- Preceded by: Bruce Givens

Personal details
- Born: November 12, 1954 (age 71)
- Party: Republican
- Spouse: Deborah
- Children: 3

Michael A. Fagg (born November 12, 1954) is an American politician in the Kansas Senate from the 14th district. He assumed office in 2021.
