= Ralph Ostmeyer =

American politician

Member of the Kansas Senate from the 40th district
- In office January 10, 2005 – January 9, 2017
- Preceded by: Stan Clark
- Succeeded by: Rick Billinger

Member of the Kansas House of Representatives from the 118th district
- In office January 8, 2001 – January 10, 2005
- Preceded by: Gayle Mollenkamp
- Succeeded by: Virginia Beamer

Personal details
- Born: May 6, 1943 (age 83)
- Party: Republican
- Spouse: Kay Ostmeyer
- Children: 7
- Profession: farmer/rancher

Ralph Ostmeyer (May 6, 1943) is a former Republican member of the Kansas Senate, representing the 40th district from 2005 through January 2017. Previously, he served as a Representative in the House (2001–2005). He is a farmer and rancher from Grinnell, and is married to Kay Ostmeyer.

== Committee assignments ==
Ostmeyer served on these legislative committees:

- Agriculture (vice-chair)
- Joint Committee on Administrative Rules and Regulations
- Federal and State Affairs
- Local Government

== Major donors ==
Some of the top contributors to Ostmeyer's 2008 campaign, according to OpenSecrets, were:

Koch Industries, Kansas Association of Realtors, Kansas Contractors Association, John G. Lewis, Dana C. Lewis, Kansas Republican Senatorial Committee

Financial, insurance and real estate were his largest donor group, followed by energy and natural resources companies.
