= Joe Newland =

American politician

Member of the Kansas House of Representatives from the 13th district
- In office August 12, 2019 – December 2022
- Preceded by: Larry Hibbard
- Succeeded by: Duane Droge

Personal details
- Party: Republican
- Spouse: Dana

Joe Newland is an American farmer and politician and has served as the president of Kansas Farm Bureau (KFB) since 2022. He served as a board director for KFB's Third District from 2011 to 2019, and was later served as a Republican member of the Kansas House of Representatives from 2019 to 2022. During his tenure, Newland represented House District 13, which included Greenwood, Elk, Woodson, Wilson, and Neosho counties in rural Southeast Kansas. He served as vice chair of the Kansas House Committee on Agriculture and Natural Resources Budget.

== Kansas House of Representatives ==
Newland was selected by Republican precinct committee members in July 2019 to fill the vacancy in the House of Representatives caused by the resignation of representative Larry Hibbard. He was sworn in on August 12, 2019, and was reelected in 2020. During his tenure, he served as vice chair of the House Committee on Agriculture and Natural Resources Budget.

He resigned his house seat in early December 2022, having been elected president of Kansas Farm Bureau.

== Kansas Farm Bureau ==
Newland served as a board director representing KFB's Third District from 2011 to 2019. In this role, he represented several Southeast Kansas counties including Allen, Bourbon, Crawford, Labette, Linn, Montgomery, Neosho, Wilson, and Woodson.

He was elected as president of KFB in 2022.

Newland resigned from the KFB presidency in 2026, after it was announced that he would be the lieutenant governor on Vicki Schmidt's campaign for governor in the 2026 Kansas gubernatorial election.

== Personal life ==
Newland and his wife, Dana, have been married for 51 years. Their farm includes 4,000 of wheat, corn, soybeans, and hay, with 450 heads of cattle. They reside in Neodesha, Kansas, and have four children.
