= Barbara Lawrence (talent manager) =

American talent manager (1943–2026)

- Born: Barbara Deitchman; January 10, 1943; New York City, U.S.
- Died: January 2, 2026 (aged 82); New York City, U.S.
- Occupation: Talent manager

Barbara Lawrence (January 10, 1943 – January 2, 2026) was an American talent manager and influential figure in the entertainment industry.

== Early life and career ==
Barbara Lawrence was born in Forest Hills, Queens, New York City on January 10, 1943. She was the daughter of Gertrude Lawrence who was a homemaker, and her husband Bernie Lawrence who worked as an executive for Nikon. She attended Forest Hills High School and later studied at the University of Miami. In the 1970s, Lawrence began her career when she joined the Abrams-Rubaloff Agency, a talent management firm in Hollywood where she met Richard Lawrence, which they later married in 1972.

== Personal life and death ==
Barbara Lawrence was married twice. Before marrying Richard Lawrence in 1972, she was married from 1967 to 1970 to actor Dennis Cooney, whose circle introduced her to notable entertainment figures.

She and Richard had two sons. Seth Lawrence, who is a talent agent with Independent Artist Group, and Evan Lawrence, who works as an account executive in concert touring and live event production.

Lawrence died on January 2, 2026, at the age of 82, while she was on vacation with her family.
