= Kansas's 24th Senate district =

American legislative district

Kansas's 24th State Senate district
Senator
| Scott Hill; R–Abilene |
- Demographics: 83% White; 2% Black; 10% Hispanic; 2% Asian; 1% Native American; 3% Other
- Population (2018): 69,121

Kansas's 24th Senate district is one of 40 districts in the Kansas Senate. It has been represented by Republican Scott Hill since 2025.

== Geography ==
District 24 is based in the city of Salina, also covering Abilene, Solomon, Chapman, and other smaller communities in Saline County and some of Dickinson County.

The district is located entirely within Kansas's 1st congressional district, and overlaps with the 69th, 70th, 71st, and 108th districts of the Kansas House of Representatives.

== Recent election results ==
=== 2020 ===
2020 Kansas Senate election, District 24
Primary election
| Party | Candidate | Votes | % |
|---|---|---|---|
| Republican | J. R. Claeys | 7,278 | 62.6 |
| Republican | Randall Hardy (incumbent) | 4,350 | 37.4 |
| Total votes | | 11,628 | 100 |
General election
| Republican | J. R. Claeys | 25,242 | 100 |
| Total votes | | 25,242 | 100 |
| Republican hold | | | |

=== 2016 ===
2016 Kansas Senate election, District 24
Primary election
| Party | Candidate | Votes | % |
|---|---|---|---|
| Republican | Randall Hardy | 4,307 | 46.3 |
| Republican | Tom Arpke (incumbent) | 3,884 | 41.8 |
| Republican | John Price | 1,103 | 11.9 |
| Total votes | | 9,294 | 100 |
General election
| Republican | Randall Hardy | 16,195 | 59.1 |
| Democratic | Donald Merriman | 11,228 | 40.9 |
| Total votes | | 27,423 | 100 |
| Republican hold | | | |

=== 2012 ===
2012 Kansas Senate election, District 24
Primary election
| Party | Candidate | Votes | % |
|---|---|---|---|
| Republican | Tom Arpke | 5,413 | 55.4 |
| Republican | Pete Brungardt (incumbent) | 4,354 | 44.6 |
| Total votes | | 9,767 | 100 |
General election
| Republican | Tom Arpke | 15,112 | 56.5 |
| Democratic | Janice Norlin | 11,650 | 43.5 |
| Total votes | | 26,762 | 100 |
| Republican hold | | | |

=== Federal and statewide results ===
| Year | Office | Results |
|---|---|---|
| 2020 | President | Trump 66.7 – 30.9% |
| 2018 | Governor | Kobach 48.0 – 42.0% |
| 2016 | President | Trump 65.3 – 26.7% |
| 2012 | President | Romney 66.3 – 31.0% |
