= Kellie Warren =

American politician

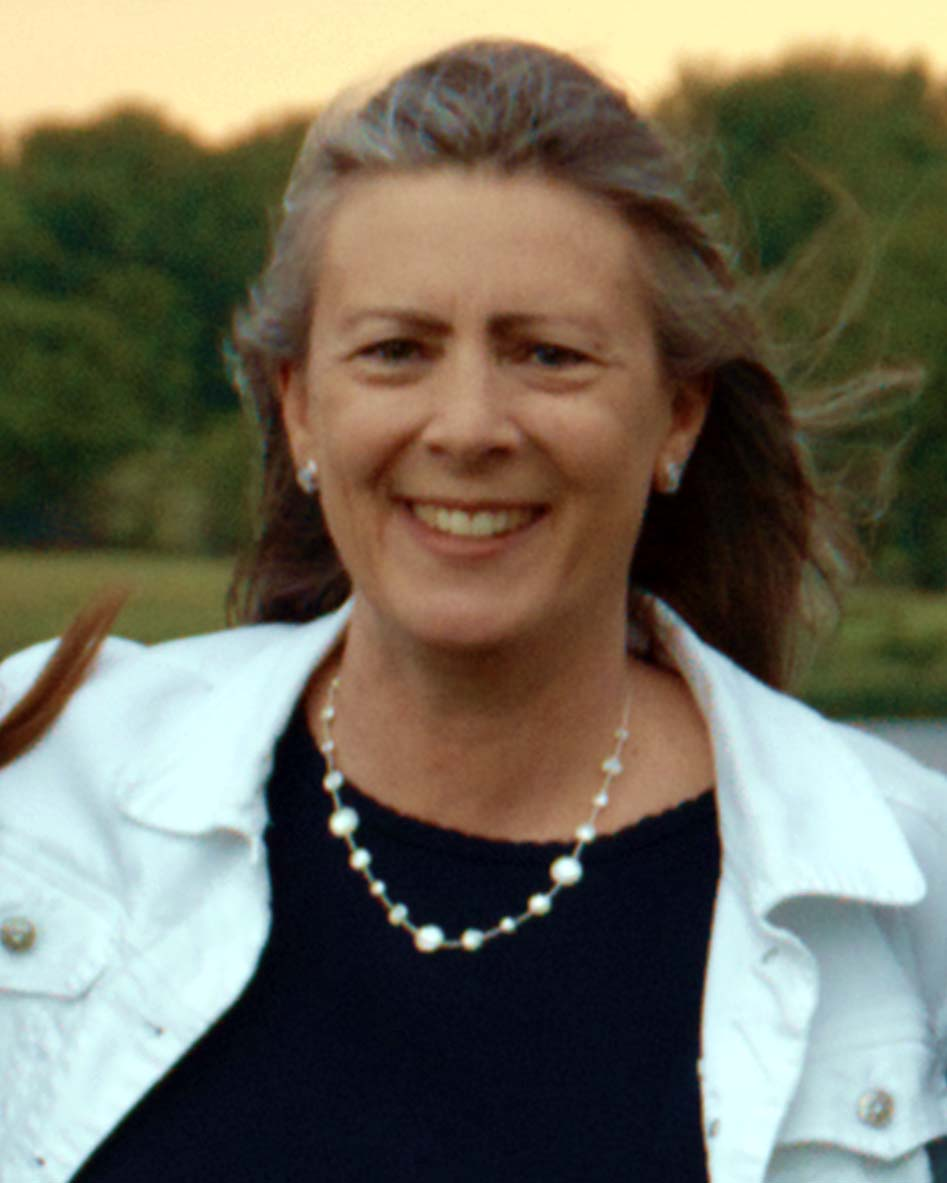

Member of the Kansas Senate from the 11th district
- Incumbent
- Assumed office January 11, 2021
- Preceded by: John Skubal

Member of the Kansas House of Representatives from the 28th district
- In office January 14, 2019 – January 11, 2021
- Preceded by: Joy Koesten
- Succeeded by: Carl Turner

Personal details
- Born: February 18, 1969 (age 57)
- Party: Republican
- Spouse: Patrick
- Children: 4
- Education: Cornell University (BA); University of Kansas (JD)
- Website: Official website Campaign website

Kellie K. Warren (born February 18, 1969) is an American politician from the state of Kansas, and former real estate attorney. A Republican, Warren serves as a member of the Kansas Senate, representing the 11th District. She has represented the 28th district in the Kansas House of Representatives, based in eastern Johnson County.

== Career ==
Warren is an attorney by trade, working at Shook, Hardy, and Bacon from 2006 until 2013, and Property Law Firm from 2013 on. Her political career began in 2018, when she challenged moderate Republican State Representative Joy Koesten in the Republican primary for the 28th district; Warren won the primary election 58-42%, and defeated Democrat Brian Clausen in November.

In 2020, Warren announced a primary challenge to State Senator John Skubal in the Senate's 11th district, an election she won 64-36%. Warren faced Koesten, now a Democrat, in the competitive general election for the seat, defeating her 53-47%.

In 2022, Warren ran unsuccessfully for Kansas Attorney General, narrowly losing in the Republican primary to Kris Kobach.

== Personal life ==
Warren lives in Leawood with her husband and their four children.
