= Maynard Yost =

American politician

Member of the Colorado Senate from the 35th district
- In office January 10, 1979 – January 12, 1983
- Preceded by: Kenneth Kinnie
- Succeeded by: Cliff Dodge

Member of the Colorado House of Representatives from the 65th district
- In office January 12, 1977 – January 10, 1979
- Preceded by: David Sprague
- Succeeded by: Melba Hastings

Personal details
- Born: October 31, 1936 Haxtun, Colorado
- Died: December 1, 2019 (aged 83) Sterling, Colorado
- Party: Republican

Maynard Yost (October 31, 1936 – December 1, 2019) was an American politician who served in the Colorado House of Representatives from the 65th district from 1977 to 1979 and in the Colorado Senate from the 35th district from 1979 to 1983.

He died on December 1, 2019, in Sterling, Colorado at age 83.
