= Joy Koesten =

American politician

Member of the Kansas House of Representatives from the 28th district
- In office January 9, 2017 – January 14, 2019
- Preceded by: Jerry Lunn
- Succeeded by: Kellie Warren

Personal details
- Born: December 30, 1954 (age 71) Springfield, Missouri, US
- Party: Democratic (2018–present)
- Other political affiliations: Republican (before 2018)

Joy Koesten (born December 30, 1954) is an American politician who served in the Kansas House of Representatives from the 28th district from 2017 to 2019.

Joy Koesten and her husband launched a campaign to fund an Endowed Professorship in Developmental and Behavioral Health at Children’s Mercy Hospital supporting research into adolescent depression and suicide prevention.

On August 7, 2018, she was defeated in the Republican primary for the 28th district by Kellie Warren. On December 13, 2018, she announced she was changing her party affiliation from Republican to Democratic.

Joy had announced that she will run for the Kansas Senate 11 Seat in the Overland Park/Leawood area on September 15, 2019. She was defeated by Republican Kellie Warren, by a vote of 52.7%, to Koesten's 47.3%.
