= Kansas's 40th Senate district =

American legislative district

Kansas's 40th State Senate district
Senator
Rick Billinger; R–Goodland
- Demographics: 90% White; 1% Black; 6% Hispanic; 1% Asian; 2% Other
- Population (2018): 72,574

Kansas's 40th Senate district is one of 40 districts in the Kansas Senate. It has been represented by Republican Rick Billinger since 2017, succeeding fellow Republican Ralph Ostmeyer.

== Geography ==
District 40 covers a vast swath of rural northwestern Kansas, including all of Cheyenne, Decatur, Ellis, Gove, Graham, Logan, Norton, Rawlins, Sheridan, Sherman, Thomas, Trego, and Wallace Counties and part of Phillips County. Communities in the district include Hays, Colby, Goodland, Norton, Ellis, Oakley, WaKeeney, Oberlin, St. Francis, Hill City, Hoxie, and Atwood.

The district is located entirely within Kansas's 1st congressional district, and overlaps with the 110th, 111th, 118th, and 120th districts of the Kansas House of Representatives. It borders the states of Nebraska and Colorado. At nearly 13,000 square miles, it is by far the largest legislative district in the state.

== Recent election results ==
=== 2020 ===
2020 Kansas Senate election, District 40
Party	Candidate	Votes	%
Republican	Rick Billinger (incumbent)	28,023	78.8
Democratic	Larry Dreiling	7,530	21.2
Total votes		35,553	100
Republican hold			

=== 2016 ===
2016 Kansas Senate election, District 40
Party	Candidate	Votes	%
Republican	Rick Billinger	23,964	74.3
Democratic	Alex Herman	8,308	25.7
Total votes		32,272	100
Republican hold			

=== 2012 ===
Republican 40th district incumbent Ralph Ostmeyer and Democratic 36th district incumbent Allen Schmidt were redistricted into the same district in 2012.

2012 Kansas Senate election, District 40
Primary election
Party	Candidate	Votes	%
Republican	Ralph Ostmeyer (incumbent)	7,396	64.5
Republican	John Miller	4,078	35.5
Total votes		11,474	100
General election
Republican	Ralph Ostmeyer (incumbent)	21,443	66.5
Democratic	Allen Schmidt (incumbent)	10,796	33.5
Total votes		32,239	100
Republican hold			

=== Federal and statewide results ===
Year	Office	Results
2020	President	Trump 79.0 – 19.0%
2018	Governor	Kobach 58.9 – 30.6%
2016	President	Trump 78.8 – 16.1%
2012	President	Romney 78.0 – 19.9%
