= Randall Hardy =

American politician

Member of the Kansas Senate from the 24th district
- In office January 9, 2017 – January 11, 2021
- Preceded by: Tom Arpke
- Succeeded by: J. R. Claeys

Personal details
- Born: July 5, 1951 (age 75) Charlotte, North Carolina, U.S.
- Party: Republican
- Children: 3
- Education: University of Kansas (MBA); Oral Roberts University (BA)

Randall Hardy (born July 5, 1951) is an American politician who served in the Kansas Senate from the 24th district from 2017 until 2021. He initially defeated incumbent Tom Arpke in the 2016 Republican primary election, before himself losing a primary to J. R. Claeys in 2020.

Hardy lives in Salina, Kansas.
