= John Skubal =

American politician

Member of the Kansas Senate from the 11th district
- In office January 9, 2017 – January 11, 2021
- Preceded by: Jeff Melcher
- Succeeded by: Kellie Warren

Personal details
- Born: September 10, 1946 (age 79)
- Party: Republican
- Spouse: Susan
- Education: Emporia State University (BS)

John Skubal (born September 10, 1946) is an American politician who served in the Kansas Senate from the 11th district from 2017 to 2021. He was defeated in the 2020 Republican primary by state representative Kellie Warren.
