= Jeff Melcher =

American business executive and politician

Member of the Kansas Senate from the 11th district
- In office January 14, 2013 – January 9, 2017
- Preceded by: John Vratil

Personal details
- Born: August 30, 1960 (age 66) Peoria, Illinois, U.S.
- Party: Republican
- Spouse: Kristin Melcher
- Children: Isabella Melcher, Jackson Melcher
- Education: Missouri University of Science and Technology; General Motors Institute

Jeff Melcher (born August 30, 1960) is an American business executive who is the Founder and CEO of Netstandard and Accutype. Melcher is also a former Republican member of the Kansas Senate, representing the 11th district from 2013 to 2017.
