= Forrest Knox =

American politician

Member of the Kansas Senate from the 14th district
- In office January 14, 2013 – January 9, 2017
- Preceded by: Dwayne Umbarger
- Succeeded by: Bruce Givens

Member of the Kansas House of Representatives from the 13th district
- In office January 10, 2005 – January 14, 2013
- Preceded by: Mary Compton
- Succeeded by: Larry Hibbard

Personal details
- Born: March 17, 1956 (age 70) Topeka, Kansas, U.S.
- Party: Republican
- Spouse: Reneé
- Children: 13
- Education: Kansas State University; Israel Institute of Technology

Forrest Knox (born March 17, 1956) is a farmer / stockman who has lived in Wilson County, Kansas since 1990. Prior to losing a Republican primary to Bruce Givens in 2016, he served in the Kansas Senate from 2013 to 2017, representing the 14th district encompassing all or part of Butler, Chautauqua, Coffey, Cowley, Elk, Greenwood, Montgomery, Wilson, and Woodson Counties - which includes much of the Kansas Flint Hills. Prior to that, he served eight years in the Kansas House of Representatives, District 13. Knox was born in Topeka, Kansas.

Knox has a bachelor's degree in mechanical engineering from Kansas State University and a Master's in mechanical engineering from the Israel Institute of Technology. He lives on their farm outside Chanute, Kansas with his wife Reneé. They have 13 children, four of whom were adopted.

== State Committee Membership ==
- House Financial Institutions (Chair)
- House Utilities
- House Energy and Utilities (Vice-Chair)
- House Environment
- Senate Judiciary
- Senate Utilities (Vice-Chair)
- House Agriculture
- House Agriculture and Natural Resources (Vice-Chair)
- Senate Agriculture
- Joint Committee on State Building Construction
- House Corrections and Juvenile Justice
- Senate Corrections and Juvenile Justice (Vice-Chair)
- Joint Committee on Corrections and Juvenile Justice Oversight
- Clean Power Plan Implementation Study Committee
- Special Committee on Judiciary
- Telecommunications Study Committee
- Special Committee on Foster Care Adequacy (Chair)
- Senate Select Committee on Kansas Public Employees Retirement System (KPERS)
- Joint Committee on State-Tribal Relations (Chair)
- Engineering Success for the Future of KS Taskforce
- House Federal and State Affairs
- Social Services Budget
- Joint Committee on Energy and Environmental Policy (Chair)
- Joint Committee on Kansas Security

== National Committee Membership ==
- National Conference of State Legislatures (NCSL) - Environment Committee (Vice-Chair)
- NCSL - Health and Human Services (Vice-Chair)
- NCSL - Communications, Financial Services and Interstate Commerce
- NCSL - Three Branch Working Group on Children's Issues
- NTSB – Nuclear Working Group

== Major Legislation ==
Knox was the sponsor/cosponsor of bills that permit teachers, public employees, and the law-abiding public in general to be armed with a concealed weapon in public, and in publicly owned Kansas buildings where adequate security does not exist, including community colleges, universities, courthouses, state and local government buildings and also, for government employees, while on the job, to provide for their own protection. In its wake, the primary insurer of the vast majority of publicly owned buildings in Kansas initially dropped coverage for those schools and other government buildings that neglected to request an exemption to the law. Other insurers picked up the coverage, often at reduced rates.

Knox proposed, and helped pass, legislation aimed at reforms in the current foster care system. One bill, which passed the Senate but was not passed into law, would create the possibility for the Kansas Department for Children and Families to authorize a pilot program for CARE foster homes, where CARE parents would be given more training and ability to "parent" foster children and meet the unique needs of each individual child.

In 2015, in his involvement on the Clean Power Plan Implementation Study Committee, Knox agreed with Chief Deputy Kansas Attorney General Jeff Chanay's statement that the (federal Clean Power Plan) rule was "clearly unlawful" and meant to systematically dismantle the coal industry, with Chanay further stating that it violated the 10th Amendment, which reserves powers not granted to the federal government by the Constitution to the states. Knox's statements implied that the state should consider resisting federal authority with regard to complying with Environmental Protection Agency regulations. Knox said "this is only one issue. There are many issues where the feds are overstepping."
