= Virgil Peck Jr. =

American politician

Member of the Kansas Senate from the 15th district
- Incumbent
- Assumed office January 11, 2021
- Preceded by: Dan Goddard

Member of the Kansas House of Representatives from the 12th district
- In office January 10, 2013 – January 9, 2017
- Preceded by: Jim Kelly
- Succeeded by: Doug Blex

Member of the Kansas House of Representatives from the 11th district
- In office January 10, 2005 – January 10, 2013
- Preceded by: James F. Miller
- Succeeded by: Jim Kelly

Personal details
- Born: Virgil Peck Jr. August 21, 1959 (age 66)
- Party: Republican
- Spouse: Tamera
- Children: 3

Virgil Peck Jr. (born August 21, 1959) is state legislator in Kansas. A Republican, he served in the Kansas House of Representatives from 2005 to 2016, representing the 11th (2005–2013) and 12th district (2013–2017). He currently represents Kansas State Senate district 15. He is the former chairman of the Kansas House Transportation and Public Safety Budget Committees, and the former Republican Majority Caucus Chairman.

Prior to his election, he campaigned for House district 11 in 2002 and for Kansas Senate district 15 in 2000.

== Political views ==
Peck identifies as "Pro-Low Taxes, Pro-Life, Pro-Education, Pro-Business, Pro-Agriculture," and "Pro-2nd Amendment." He states, "We need to address property tax relief, immigration reform, health care costs, state debt, and bring state government spending under control."

On March 14, 2011, during a committee discussion about a state plan to use gunmen in helicopters to control the feral swine population, Peck said, "If shooting these immigrating feral hogs works, maybe we have found a (solution) to our illegal immigration problem." Peck later issued an apology, stating, "My statements yesterday were regrettable. Please accept my apology."

In the 2013 legislative session, Peck introduced a bill to raise lawmakers pay by $10,000. The bill failed to receive substantial support.

== Committee membership ==
Representative Peck serves on the following legislative committees:

- Joint Committee on Legislative Post Audit (chair)
- Education Budget
- Elections
- Local Government
- Pensions & Benefits
