= Kansas's 14th Senate district =

American legislative district

Kansas's 14th State Senate district
Senator
Michael Fagg; R–El Dorado
- Demographics: 91% White; 2% Black; 3% Hispanic; 0% Asian; 1% Native American; 3% Other
- Population (2018): 68,478

Kansas's 14th Senate district is one of 40 districts in the Kansas Senate. It has been represented by Republican Michael Fagg since 2025.

== Geography ==
District 14 covers Chautauqua, Coffey, Elk, Greenwood, Wilson, and Woodson Counties and parts of Butler, Cowley, and Montgomery Counties in the Flint Hills to the east of Wichita. Communities in the district include El Dorado, Burlington, Eureka, Neodesha, Fredonia, Sedan, Yates Center, Douglass, Towanda, Howard, and part of Winfield.

The district overlaps with Kansas's 2nd and 4th congressional districts, and with the 12th, 13th, 75th, 76th, 77th, and 79th districts of the Kansas House of Representatives. It borders the state of Oklahoma.

== Recent election results ==
=== 2020 ===
2020 Kansas Senate election, District 14
Primary election
Party	Candidate	Votes	%
Republican	Michael Fagg	7,452	53.6
Republican	Bruce Givens (incumbent)	6,459	46.4
Total votes		13,911	100
General election
Republican	Michael Fagg	28,501	100
Total votes		28,501	100
Republican hold			

=== 2016 ===
2016 Kansas Senate election, District 14
Primary election
Party	Candidate	Votes	%
Republican	Bruce Givens	6,513	52.5
Republican	Forrest Knox (incumbent)	5,900	47.5
Total votes		12,413	100
Democratic	Mark Pringle	1,174	54.5
Democratic	Carl Shay Jr.	980	45.5
Total votes		2,154	100
General election
Republican	Bruce Givens	20,452	72.6
Democratic	Mark Pringle	7,702	27.4
Total votes		28,154	100
Republican hold			

=== 2012 ===
2012 Kansas Senate election, District 14
Primary election
Party	Candidate	Votes	%
Republican	Forrest Knox	7,416	58.5
Republican	John Grange	5,254	41.5
Total votes		12,670	100
General election
Republican	Forrest Knox	21,790	72.3
Democratic	Eden Fuson	8,349	27.7
Total votes		30,139	100
Republican hold			

=== Federal and statewide results ===
Year	Office	Results
2020	President	Trump 76.6 – 21.4%
2018	Governor	Kobach 57.8 – 31.7%
2016	President	Trump 74.9 – 19.3%
2012	President	Romney 72.1 – 25.5%
