= Bruce Givens =

American politician (born 1956)

Member of the Kansas Senate from the 14th district
- In office January 9, 2017 – January 11, 2021
- Preceded by: Forrest Knox
- Succeeded by: Michael Fagg

Personal details
- Born: February 26, 1956 (age 70) Coffeyville, Kansas, U.S.
- Party: Republican
- Spouse: Sue
- Children: 1
- Education: Emporia State University

Bruce Givens (born February 26, 1956) is an American politician who has served in the Kansas Senate from the 14th district from 2017 to 2021.
