= Kansas's 11th Senate district =

American legislative district

Kansas's 11th State Senate district
Senator
Kellie Warren; R–Leawood
- Demographics: 83% White; 2% Black; 4% Hispanic; 9% Asian; 1% Other
- Population (2018): 75,090

Kansas's 11th Senate district is one of 40 districts in the Kansas Senate. It has been represented by Republican Kellie Warren since 2021.

== Geography ==
District 11 covers much of Leawood and parts of eastern Overland Park in the Johnson County suburbs of Kansas City.

The district is located entirely within Kansas's 3rd congressional district, and overlaps with the 8th, 19th, 20th, 27th, 28th, and 48th districts of the Kansas House of Representatives. It borders the state of Missouri.

== Recent election results ==
=== 2020 ===
2020 Kansas Senate election, District 11
Primary election
Party	Candidate	Votes	%
Republican	Kellie Warren	9,131	63.9
Republican	John Skubal (incumbent)	5,154	36.1
Total votes		14,285	100
General election
Republican	Kellie Warren	24,846	52.7
Democratic	Joy Koesten	22,317	47.3
Total votes		47,163	100
Republican hold			

=== 2016 ===
2016 Kansas Senate election, District 11
Primary election
Party	Candidate	Votes	%
Republican	John Skubal	5,665	56.5
Republican	Jeff Melcher (incumbent)	4,360	43.5
Total votes		10,025	100
General election
Republican	John Skubal	25,992	65.0
Democratic	Skip Fannen	13,983	35.0
Total votes		39,975	100
Republican hold			

=== 2012 ===
2012 Kansas Senate election, District 11
Primary election
Party	Candidate	Votes	%
Republican	Jeff Melcher	5,479	59.4
Republican	Pat Colloton	3,748	40.6
Total votes		9,227	100
General election
Republican	Jeff Melcher	23,565	62.8
Democratic	Michael Delaney	13,985	37.2
Total votes		37,550	100
Republican hold			

=== Federal and statewide results ===
Year	Office	Results
2020	President	Biden 52.4 – 45.9%
2018	Governor	Kelly 52.8 – 40.9%
2016	President	Trump 50.0 – 44.6%
2012	President	Romney 64.0 – 34.7%
