= Dan Goddard =

American politician (1947–2026)

Member of the Kansas House of Representatives from the 7th district
- In office January 9, 2023 – October 29, 2026
- Preceded by: Richard Proehl

Member of the Kansas Senate from the 15th district
- In office January 9, 2017 – January 11, 2021
- Preceded by: Jeff King
- Succeeded by: Virgil Peck Jr.

Personal details
- Born: November 3, 1947
- Died: October 29, 2026 (aged 78) Parsons, Kansas, U.S.
- Party: Republican
- Spouse: Robin

Daniel W. Goddard (November 3, 1947 – October 29, 2026) was an American politician who served in the Kansas House of Representatives, from January 9, 2023 until his death. He previously served in the Kansas Senate for the 15th district from 2017 to 2021. Goddard was elected unopposed in House District 7 in the 2022 Kansas House of Representatives election.

Goddard died at his home in Parsons, Kansas, on October 29, 2026, at the age of 78.
