= Rick Billinger =

Republican member of the Kansas Senate

Member of the Kansas Senate from the 40th district
- Incumbent
- Assumed office January 9, 2017
- Preceded by: Ralph Ostmeyer

Member of the Kansas House of Representatives from the 120th district
- In office January 12, 2015 – January 9, 2017
- Preceded by: Ward Cassidy
- Succeeded by: Adam Smith

Member of the Kansas House of Representatives from the 121st district
- In office January 10, 2011 – January 14, 2013
- Preceded by: James Morrison
- Succeeded by: Arlen Siegfreid

Personal details
- Born: December 16, 1951 (age 74) Quinter, Kansas, U.S.
- Party: Republican
- Spouse: Rita
- Children: 3
- Education: Fort Hays State University
- Profession: farmer

Richard L. Billinger (born December 16, 1951) is an American politician serving as a member of the Kansas Senate for the 40th district.

== Career ==
Billinger represented the 121st district of the Kansas House of Representatives, was redistricted and ran for the 120th in 2012 and lost his primary to Ward Cassidy, then won the 120th in 2014.

Billinger succeeded Ralph Ostmeyer in the Kansas Senate in 2017. The senate district covers the entirety of Cheyenne, Decatur, Ellis, Gove, Graham, Logan, Norton, Rawlins, Sheridan, Sherman, Thomas, Trego, and Wallace Counties and also part of Phillips County.
