= Anthony Hensley =

American politician

Minority Leader of the Kansas Senate
- In office January 8, 1996 – January 11, 2021
- Succeeded by: Dinah Sykes

Member of the Kansas Senate from the 19th district
- In office January 11, 1993 – January 11, 2021
- Preceded by: Nancy Parrish
- Succeeded by: Rick Kloos

Member of the Kansas House of Representatives from the 58th district
- In office January 10, 1977 – January 11, 1993
- Preceded by: William Kenneth Marshall
- Succeeded by: Richard M. Nichols

Personal details
- Born: September 2, 1953 (age 72) Topeka, Kansas, U.S.
- Party: Democratic
- Spouse: Deborah Hensley
- Children: 1
- Education: Washburn University (BA); Kansas State University (MA)
- Website: Official website

Anthony Hensley (born September 2, 1953) is a former Democratic member of the Kansas Senate, representing the 19th district since 1992. He was the Minority Leader from 1996 through 2021 and has also been a committeeman of the Democratic Precinct since 1976. In 1992, he was the Majority Whip. From 1977 to 1992, he was a Representative. In 1991 and 1992, he was the chairman of the 2nd District Democratic Committee and from 1981 to 1986, he was the chairman of the Shawnee County Democratic Central Committee. On November 3, 2020, he was defeated in his re-election campaign by Republican Rick Kloos.

== 2020 Kansas 19th Senate district campaign ==
Hensley's opponent Kloos ran unchallenged in the GOP primary where he received 6,758 votes in the primary, while Hensley had 5,269, who also ran unopposed. Kloos beat Hensley 16,141 votes to 15,383 votes, 51% to 49%, on the November 3, 2020 general election—in what Titus Wu of the Topeka Capitol-Journal called "a huge upset victory". Kloos is pro-life and was endorsed by Kansans for Life. Hensley had represented the area for 44 years as either the state representative or state senator. The Kloos campaign outspent Hensley $37,433 to $1,286.

== Personal life ==
Hensley graduated from Washburn University in 1975 and later received his master's degree in special education from Kansas State University. He then taught special education at Topeka's Capital City School until 2011. Hensley teaches government and political affairs to high school students within the Topeka area.

== Committee assignments ==
Hensley served on the following legislative committees:

- 2015 Special Committee on K-12 Student Success
- Assessment and Taxation
- Confirmation Oversight (Vice-chair)
- Education (Ranking minority member)
- Interstate Cooperation (Ranking minority member)
- Joint Committee on Pensions, Investments, and Benefits
- Legislative Coordinating Council
- Legislative Post Audit Committee
- Senate Select Committee on KPERS (Ranking minority member)
- Transportation

== Major donors ==
Some of the top contributors to Hensley's 2008 campaign, according to OpenSecrets:

Kansas Democratic Party, Greater Kansas City Chamber of Commerce, Kansas Association of Realtors, Kansas Credit Union Association, Kansas Dental Association

Political parties were his largest donor group.
