= Kansas's 30th Senate district =

American legislative district

Kansas's 30th State Senate district
Senator
Renee Erickson; R–Wichita
- Demographics: 63% White; 12% Black; 11% Hispanic; 9% Asian; 1% Native American; 4% Other
- Population (2018): 72,878

Kansas's 30th Senate district is one of 40 districts in the Kansas Senate. It has been represented by Republican Renee Erickson since 2025.

== Geography ==
District 30 covers eastern Wichita and its immediate suburbs in Sedgwick County, including Eastborough and a small part of Andover.

The district is located entirely within Kansas's 4th congressional district, and overlaps with the 83rd, 85th, 87th, 88th, and 99th districts of the Kansas House of Representatives.

== Recent election results ==
=== 2020 ===
2020 Kansas Senate election, District 30
Primary election
Party	Candidate	Votes	%
Democratic	Melissa Gregory	2,928	58.4
Democratic	Amy Lyon	2,088	41.6
Total votes		5,016	100
General election
Republican	Renee Erickson	17,376	51.8
Democratic	Melissa Gregory	16,199	48.2
Total votes		33,575	100
Republican hold			

=== 2016 ===
2016 Kansas Senate election, District 30
Primary election
Party	Candidate	Votes	%
Democratic	Anabel Larumbe	1,230	65.0
Democratic	Nathan Tokola	661	35.0
Total votes		1,891	100
General election
Republican	Susan Wagle (incumbent)	16,636	58.5
Democratic	Anabel Larumbe	11,786	41.5
Total votes		28,422	100
Republican hold			

=== 2012 ===
2012 Kansas Senate election, District 30
Party	Candidate	Votes	%
Republican	Susan Wagle (incumbent)	16,700	61.3
Democratic	Patrick Cantwell	10,527	38.7
Total votes		27,227	100
Republican hold			

=== Federal and statewide results ===
Year	Office	Results
2020	President	Biden 49.3 – 48.2%
2018	Governor	Kelly 53.3 – 39.2%
2016	President	Trump 50.2 – 42.7%
2012	President	Romney 57.3 – 40.8%
