= Laura Owen =

American business executive, entrepreneur and political appointee

Kansas Secretary of Commerce
- In office 1991–1992
- Governor: Joan Finney

Personal details
- Born: November 11, 1957 (age 68) Bucks County, Pennsylvania, U.S.
- Spouse: Dave Owen
- Education: Delaware Valley University (BS)

Laura Owen (born Laura Smith, November 11, 1957) is an American business executive, entrepreneur, and former political appointee. Under the name Laura Nicholl, she was the first woman appointed to serve as Kansas Secretary of Commerce.

== Early life and education ==
A native of Bucks County, Pennsylvania, she attended Council Rock High School in Newtown, Pennsylvania. She earned a Bachelor of Science degree in Business Administration from Delaware Valley University and attended the University of Paris. Owen was the first woman executive hired as part of an executive training program at St. Regis Paper Company. Owen worked as a financial advisor, and for Stephens Inc. investment bank, in the 1980s.

== Career ==
In January 1991, she was appointed Secretary of Commerce by Governor Joan Finney at the start of Finney's administration. Finney claimed to have dismissed Owen in June 1992, officially because the governor disapproved of her overseas travel expenses. Owen claimed to have resigned, defended her travel expenses and pointed out that her departure came after a disagreement between her and the governor about a proposed mortgage revenue bond issue, which later came under fire by Kansas state lawmakers. The dismissal was one of many during the first eighteen months of Finney's administration, in which 10 cabinet posts were held by 21 people.

Owen and her husband, former Kansas Lieutenant Governor Dave Owen, founded ICOP Digital, Inc., a business which engineered and marketed mobile video and digital surveillance products. The company traded in the NASDAQ under the ticker ICOP and received the Patriot Award from the United States Department of Defense in 2008. She served as president and Chief Operating Officer while David Owen served as CEO. ICOP's first international market was Saudi Arabia. The company ceased operations in December 2010 and was in bankruptcy proceedings when it was acquired by Safety Vision LLC in 2011.

Owen is the founder and CEO of Ponscio, an online social network that aims to advance the lives of women entrepreneurs through education, mentoring and access to capital. The company is part of the Global Innovation through Science and Technology initiative and collaborates with the United Nations Foundation's Global Accelerator program. Owen was also the founder and CEO of PontSalus, a healthcare consulting company. Owen worked on the board of Heart to Heart International, a philanthropic institution, and she and her husband donated $250,000 to establish the David C. Owen Leadership Institute at Ottawa University. In 2012, she was named to the Board of Trustees of Delaware Valley University.
