= Fred Logan =

American politician

Member of the Kansas Board of Regents
- In office 2011–2015
- Governor: Sam Brownback

56th Chairman of the Kansas Republican Party
- In office January 1987 – January 1989
- Governor: Mike Hayden
- Preceded by: Vern Chesbro
- Succeeded by: Rochelle Chronister

Personal details
- Born: 1952 (age 73–74) St. Joseph, Missouri
- Party: Republican
- Education: Indiana University Bloomington B.A. Indiana University Maurer School of Law J.D.
- Occupation: Lawyer

Fred Logan is an American politician who served as Chairman of the Kansas Republican Party from 1987 to 1989. Other than being involved in local politics, he is also a lawyer, professor and journalist.

== Early life ==
Logan was born in St. Joseph, Missouri, but despite living in Missouri, attended high school at the South Overland Park High School in Overland Park, Kansas, graduating in 1970. Logan initially enrolled in Kansas University, but would transfer to Indiana University in 1971. He graduated with a Bachelor of Arts in Political science in 1974. While in university he was a member of Beta Theta Pi, and remained a lifelong active member. He then attended George Washington University Law School in Washington D.C. for a year before transferring to the Indiana University Maurer School of Law, earning a Juris Doctor as a Cum Laude in 1977.

After graduating, he and his brother started the Logan Logan & Watson law firm in Prairie Village, Kansas. As a lawyer, Logan focuses on business law, public and not-for-profit law, real estate, probate and estate planning law, and administrative law.

== Career ==
=== Kansas Republican Party ===
Logan had been active in local politics since his time as a lawyer, serving as the Chairman of the Johnson County Republican Party. He was elected State Chairman on February 1, 1987, to succeed the retiring Vern Chesbro. At the time Logan was the youngest chairman in the Kansas Republican Party's history. Logan and Chesbro where ideologically aligned, and Logan was largely seen as a continuation of Chesbro and his policies. Coming into office, Logan supported incumbent governor Mike Hayden and Logan's election was seen as another mandate to the moderate, Bob Dole-esque, wing to continue to lead the Kansas Republican Party.

Logan would be chairman during the 1988 presidential election which saw George H. W. Bush carry the state. However, during the local elections to the Kansas Senate and the Kansas House of Representatives Republicans suffered a significant loss, losing 2 senate seats and 6 house seats, shaking the perceived dominance of the party in the state. Shortly afterwards he would be replaced as State chairman by Rochelle Chronister, an experienced member of the Kansas House of Representatives, and a more recognizable face of the moderate wing of the party.

=== Advocacy work ===
Ever since his time as State Chairman, Logan has focused on improving Higher education within the state, as an incentive to prevent local students from attending college or university outside the state. Namely improving the State's Public University as well as its Community College system. In order to accomplish this he has been an advocate of tax breaks, tuition reductions and other bonuses for Kansas high-school students to attend college in state. Due to his education advocacy he was appointed to the Kansas Board of Regents by then governor Sam Brownback, serving on the board from 2011 to 2015, and serving as board president from 2013 to 2014. Logan endorsed Amanda Adkins in 2019 for her 2020 bid for the United States House of Representatives. Additionally, Logan and his wife have been a longtime sponsors of the Johnson county Parks and Recreation department. Logan has also served as chairman of the Masonic Cancer Alliance and testified in favor of the University of Kansas Medical Center being designed a National Cancer Institute.

Party political offices
Preceded by Vern Chesbro	Chairman of the Kansas Republican Party; 1987–1989	Succeeded by Rochelle Chronister
