= Vern Chesbro =

American politician

Vernon Chesbro

55th Chairman of the Kansas Republican Party
- In office January 1985 – January 1987
- Preceded by: David C. Owen
- Succeeded by: Fred Logan

Personal details
- Born: October 1, 1925 Ottawa, Kansas
- Died: January 23, 2010 (aged 84)
- Party: Republican
- Spouse: Phyllis A. Hard
- Children: 3
- Education: University of Denver
- Occupation: Business executive

Military service
- Branch/service: United States Merchant Marine; United States Navy
- Years of service: 1941-1945
- Battles/wars: World War II

Vernon "Vern" Chesbro (1925 - 2010) was an American politician from Kansas who was an active member of the State's local Republican Party. Running for the State Senate and being elected as the state's party chairman from 1985 to 1987. He was the leader of the state's moderate wing and support bi-partisan work with the state Democrats.

== Early life ==
Vern was born in Ottawa, Kansas on October 1, 1925, the eldest son of Vernon M. Jack and B. Ferne Chesbro. He was a graduate of Ottawa High School and of the University of Denver. He served in the United States Merchant Marine and the United States Navy during World War II. He managed The Shawnee Inn & Golf Resort in Topeka and in 1950 returned to Ottawa to own and manage the North American Hotel along with his mother. In 1958 he began a telephone startup service eventually growing to become Contel.

== Political career ==
Chesbro recollected that his interest in politics was sparked when he watched Mr. Smith Goes to Washington in high school. In 1939, at the age of 14, Chesbro worked on the campaign of his part-time employer, pharmacist Howard Bentley, when he ran for a Kansas Senate seat. Although Bentley would be defeated, Chesbro met his opponent John Etling, who hired him as his page when he took office in 1940. He also recollected that the pages were paid $2 a day for setting up materials before sessions and cleaning up after sessions. While the sessions were in session they roamed the Kansas State Capitol in a pack, often congregating in the off-limit dome to watch the painter, John Steuart Curry paint its controversial murals. Chesbro stated that the opportunity to work as a page deeply influenced his life to pursue a career in politics.

Upon his return from the Navy, he worked in various departments of the Kansas State government. He was on the board of the Kansas Public Employees Retirement System for 10 years, serving 2 years as the board president. He served on the Advisory Committee for Ambassador Clayton Yeutter and was a member of the Weigand Tax Commission. He was a committee member with the Ottawa Chamber of Commerce and the Ottawa-Franklin County Economic Development Organization. He was a board member of the Contel PAC and as chairman. He was the campaign advisor to many local political campaigns and personally met with 6 United States Presidents. However, his most important office would be his election as Chairman of the Kansas Republican Party for a term from 1985 to 1987. During his time in office he championed bi-partisanship and supported youth engagement to increase voter turnout. Chesbro was seen as a leader of the party's moderate, socially liberal wing. He refused to seek another term, retiring. At the time Chesbro was the oldest chairman in the party's history at 62, and his successor, Fred Logan was the youngest at 35. The moderate faction would hold the chair until David Miller was elected to it in 1995. In 2000 Chesbro would challenge incumbent Robert Tyson to Kansas's 12th Senate district in the primary, but would be defeated getting only 29.55% to Tyson's 70.45%, effectively ending his political career.

== Later life and death ==
Chesbro retired from Contel as its vice president in 1983. Contel would be acquired by GTE in 1991. He also worked for the Patriots Bank Group in Garnett, Kansas. On January 19, 2010, he was diagnosed with late-stage terminal cancer and handed the detailed journals of his entire political life to The Topeka Capital-Journal before he died on January 23. 2010.

== Legacy ==
Following his death, Franklin County, Kansas, opened the Vern Chesbro Memorial Scholarship Fund for high school students pursuing higher education for public administration or political science. Additionally, a portion of US Highway 59 north of Ottawa was renamed the Vern Chesbro Memorial Highway.

== Personal life ==
Out of the Navy in 1946, Chesbro married Phyllis A. Née Hart in 1946. The couple remained married for 63 years and had three kids. Two daughters, Sue and Linda, and a son Scott. He served on the Ransom Memorial Hospital Charitable Board. He was a Freemason and member of the Ottawa Lodge #18, AF & AM for over 50 years. He was a member of the Benevolent and Protective Order of Elks for 56 years at Ottawa lodge #803. He was also a member of Veterans of Foreign Wars, the American Legion, and Kiwanis.

== Electoral history ==
2000 Kansas Senate election 12th District Republican primary results.
| Party | Candidate | Votes | % |
|---|---|---|---|
| Republican | Robert Tyson | 5,535 | 70.45% |
| Republican | Vern Chesbro | 2,321 | 29.55% |
| Total votes | | 7,856 | 100% |

Party political offices
| Preceded by David C. Owen | Chairman of the Kansas Republican Party; 1985–1987 | Succeeded by Fred Logan |
