= Shelby Smith =

American politician (1927–2020)

Member of the Kansas House of Representatives
- In office 1967–1975

39th Lieutenant Governor of Kansas
- In office January 13, 1975 – January 8, 1979
- Governor: Robert Frederick Bennett
- Preceded by: Dave Owen
- Succeeded by: Paul Dugan

Personal details
- Born: August 8, 1927 St. Joseph, Missouri, U.S.
- Died: November 6, 2020 (aged 93) Wichita, Kansas, U.S.
- Party: Republican
- Education: University of Kansas

Shelby Smith (August 8, 1927 – November 6, 2020) was an American Republican politician from the state of Kansas. He attended the University of Kansas and served in the United States Navy in World War II and the Korean War. He served as a member of the Kansas House of Representatives from 1967 to 1975, then as the 39th Lieutenant Governor of Kansas from 1975 to 1979. In 1988, Governor Mike Hayden named Smith as his secretary of administration. Smith died on November 6, 2020.

Party political offices
Preceded by Dave Owen	Republican nominee for Lieutenant Governor of Kansas; 1974	Succeeded by Larry "Monty" Montgomery
Political offices
Preceded by Dave Owen	Lieutenant Governor of Kansas; 1975–1979	Succeeded by Paul Dugan
