= Rochelle Chronister =

American politician

Secretary Rochelle Chronister

Kansas Secretary of Social and Rehabilitation Services
- In office 1995–1999
- Governor: Bill Graves
- Preceded by: Donna Whiteman
- Succeeded by: Janet Schalansky

57th Chairwoman of the Kansas Republican Party
- In office January 1989 – January 1991
- Preceded by: Fred Logan
- Succeeded by: Kim Wells

Member of the Kansas House of Representatives from the 13th district
- In office 1979–1995

Personal details
- Born: Rochelle Ruth Beach; August 27, 1939 Garden City, Kansas, U.S.
- Died: April 2, 2023 (aged 83) Neodesha, Kansas, U.S.
- Education: University of Kansas
- Occupation: Virologist

Rochelle Ruth Chronister (née Beach; August 27, 1939 – April 2, 2023) was an American politician from southwest Kansas who served in the Kansas Legislature, as the 57th Chairwoman of the Kansas Republican Party and as Secretary of the Kansas Department of Social and Rehabilitation Services.

== Early life ==
Chronister was born in Garden City, Kansas on August 27, 1939. She attended the University of Kansas and graduated with a Bachelor of Arts. From 1961 to 1964 she worked for the University of Kansas Medical Center as a Research Virologist. She also worked as Vice President of the joint venture for the Neodesha Lumber Company.

== Political career ==
=== State legislator ===
Chronister was elected to the Kansas House of Representatives in 1978. She would serve from 1979 to 1995. She served as Assistant Majority Leader of the House from 1983 to 1986, and was the first women in a Kansas House leadership position.

=== Republican Chairwoman ===
Chronister, a longtime leader of Moderate Republicans in the Kansas house was selected as the State Republican Party Chairwomen in 1989. Later that year she demanded the resignation of the head of the Kansas Bureau of Investigation, David E. Johnson, following the breaking of a scandal that he told a racist joke to two reporters from The Kansas City Times going as far as pen a letter to Kansas Attorney General Robert Stephan demanding his removal. She would never send the letter as Johnson resigned before she could.

=== Secretary of Social and Rehabilitation Services ===
During her tenure she oversaw the privatization of the State's foster care system. She supported the system as it was being implemented in the 1990s and discredited issues with the system as transitional hiccups. Additionally, in 2017 when the system was being reviewed, she continued to stand by her earlier statements and testified in favor of keeping the system private.

As secretary she was a defendant to the lawsuit; Calderon v. Kansas Department of Social and Rehabilitation Services, where a Mexican American women, Maria Del Carmen Calderon, lost custody of her children, and was asked her citizenship status by a local judge when she appealed. Claiming that this violated her Fourth, Fourteenth and Fifth amendment rights, she sued the entire department of the Kansas state government. The case eventually reached the United States Court of Appeals for the Tenth Circuit. Claiming emotional injury and demanding compensation of $8 million, the court was "unable to discern the basis for Ms. Calderon's claims" and dismissed all claims against the judge, Chronister, and the department as a whole on July 6, 1999.

=== Political advocacy ===
In 1990 she was inducted into the University of Kansas' Emily Taylor Center for Women & Gender Equity. Chronister was the co-chairwomen of a fundraiser by the Wilson Medical Center in Wilson County, Kansas, and helped surpass the medical center's $2.2 million goal to build a new hospital. She is also a member of the medical center's board of trustees.

Chronister is also the spokeswomen of the Traditional Republicans for Common Sense, a group of moderate centrist and liberal Republicans who opposed the conservative policies of Governor Sam Brownback. Namely opposing his reduction of the State income tax and the public school budget. Additionally during his 2014 re-election campaign Chronister refused to endorse Brownback and instead endorsed his Democratic challenger Paul Davis. Chronister and the Traditional Republicans for Common Sense also denounced senator Pat Roberts during his 2014 re-election bid, endorsing his independent challenger Greg Orman.

Party political offices
Preceded by Fred Logan	Chairwoman of the Kansas Republican Party; 1989–1991	Succeeded by Kim Wells
