= Kansas Republican Party =

Kansas affiliate of the Republican Party

- Chairperson: Danedri Herbert
- Senate President: Ty Masterson
- House Speaker: Daniel Hawkins
- Founded: May 18, 1859
- Headquarters: 800 SW Jackson St., Suite 1300; Topeka, KS 66612
- Membership (2021): ▲871,817
- Ideology: Conservatism
- National affiliation: Republican Party
- Colors: Red (unofficial)
- U.S. Senate seats: 2 / 2
- U.S. House seats: 3 / 4
- Statewide executive offices: 4 / 6
- Seats in the Kansas Senate: 31 / 40
- Seats in the Kansas House of Representatives: 88 / 125

Election symbol

Website
- www.kansas.gop

The Kansas Republican Party is the state affiliate political party in Kansas of the United States Republican Party. The Kansas Republican Party was organized in May 1859.

At the state level, the party is largely split between its moderate and conservative ideological factions, with the moderates often willing to work with Democrats on legislation and other matters. Because of this divide, Kansas is sometimes described as having "three-party politics." In recent years, as the national Republican Party has grown more conservative, some moderates have left the party to become Democrats. It is currently the dominant party in the state, controlling all but one of Kansas' four U.S. House seats, both U.S. Senate seats, and supermajorities in both houses of the state legislature. The statewide offices that the party does not control are the governorship and the lieutenant governorship which are currently held by Democrats Laura Kelly and David Toland respectively.

== Party structure and governance ==
The current internal operating rules for the Kansas Republican Party and its biannual platform can be found on the party webpage: www.kansas.gop. The current Kansas Republican Party structure includes the following elements:

- Precincts: Kansas is divided into thousands of administrative voting districts called precincts. Precincts are not based on population and range from zero registered voters to 2,500 voters. During the biannual primary election in August, the registered Republican voters in each precinct elect one precinct committeeman and one precinct committeewoman (also known as "precinct leaders"). Vacancies in precinct positions may be filled by the county party chair. In the event that an elected partisan state legislative or county office becomes vacant, the precinct leaders from that district will meet and elect a replacement
- County Party: Each of the 105 counties has an active Republican County Party. Every two years, between the primary election and two weeks after the general election, all the precinct committee people – the county party "Central Committee" – hold a meeting and elect county party officers, a chair, vice chair, secretary and treasurer. Each county party is responsible for recruiting, advising, and supporting county-level candidates and supporting all Republican candidates whose district includes all or part of the county
- County Delegates: At the biannual meeting of the precinct committeemen, county delegates are elected. Each county has two automatic delegates, its chair and vice chair. Additional delegates are awarded based on the total number of Republican votes from the county in the last primary election. While most counties have only 2 delegates, large counties, like Sedgwick and Johnson, have dozens of county delegates
- District Committee: The county delegates assemble in four different Congressional District Committees. In December or January after each general election, the District Committees meet and elect four officers (chair, vice-chair, secretary, and treasurer) and 37 delegates and 37 alternate delegates to the state committee. In presidential election years, the District Committee meets to elect some of the delegates to the Republican National Convention. In the event a Congressional office becomes vacant, the District Committee will select the Republican candidate for the special election to fill the vacancy
- State Committee: The state committee, currently has 179 members, and is made up of 37 delegates from each congressional district, the chair and vice-chair of each district, the six state party officers, key elected officials and leaders of Republican affiliated groups. The State Committee meets at least twice a year. Every two years the newly elected delegates elect new state party officers – a chair, vice-chair, secretary and treasurer. During the first meeting in a Presidential election year, the state committee elects a National Committeeman and Committeewoman, who take office immediately after the Republican national convention. The state committee approves resolutions, changes to the state party constitution and by-laws, and approves the party platform every two years
- Executive Committee: The Executive committee currently has 38 members and is made up of the party officers, elected officials, leaders of Republican affiliated groups, and some specially appointed and elected individuals. The Executive Committee meets at State Committee meetings and by phone several times during the year. Budgetary and other administrative supervisory duties are tasked to the executive committee
- State party officers: There are six party officers. The chair, vice-chair, secretary, and treasurer are elected every two years. The national committeeman and women are elected every four years. The chair may hire an executive director and other paid staff with the approval of the executive committee
- Republican House Campaign Committee (RHCC) and Kansas Republican Senatorial Committee (KRSC): These are special party organizations composed of Republican Representatives and Senators. The role of these organizations is to recruit, advise, and support Republican candidates for the Kansas House and Senate. The Representatives and Senators elect the leadership for each organization

== Current party leadership ==
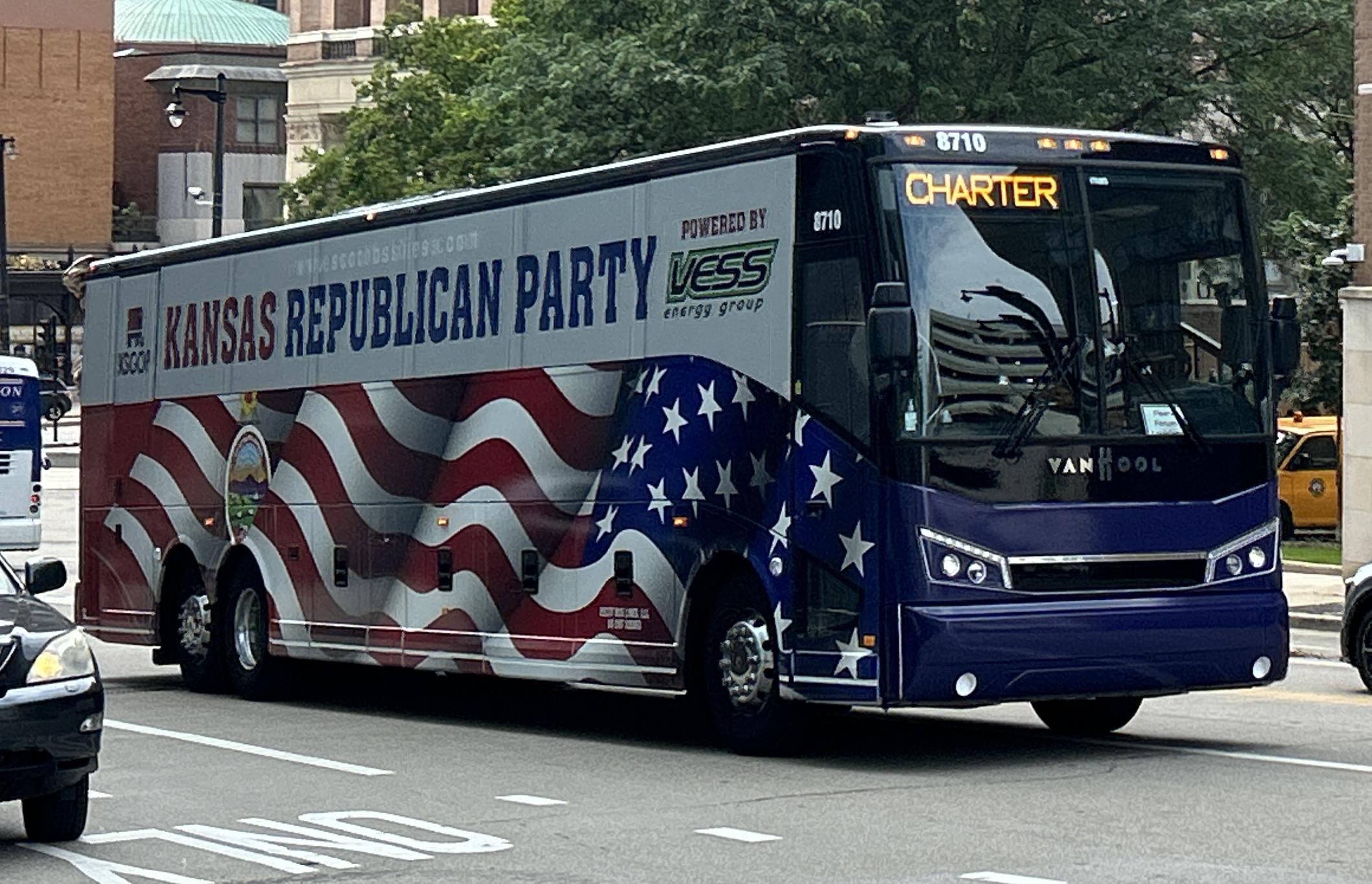
Kansas Republican Party bus at the 2024 Republican National Convention

Party officers

- Chair: Danedri Herbert
- Vice-chair: Andrew Hooser
- Secretary: Amanda Schlyer
- Treasurer: Roger Lomshek
- National Committeewoman: Wendy Bingesser
- National Committeeman: Mark Kahrs
- 1st District Chair: Chris McGowne
- 2nd District Chair: Don Alexander
- 3rd District Chair: Matt Bingesser
- 4th District Chair: Debbie Luper

Executive Committee Members:

- the 10 party officers
- Vice Chair of each Congressional District Committee
- Senator Jerry Moran or Designee
- Senator Roger Marshall or Designee
- Congressman Tracey Mann or Designee
- Congressman Derek Schmidt or Designee
- Congressman Ron Estes or Designee
- Secretary of State Scott Schwab or Designee
- Attorney General Kris Kobach or Designee
- State Treasurer Steven Johnson or Designee
- Insurance Commissioner Vicki Schmidt or Designee
- Senate President Ty Masterson or Designee
- Senate Majority Leader Chase Blasi or Designee
- Speaker of the House Daniel Hawkins or Designee
- House Majority Leader Chris Croft or Designee
- Kansas Black Republican Council chair
- Kansas Federation of Republican Women chair
- Kansas Republican Hispanic Assembly chair
- Kansas Federation of Young Republicans chair
- Kansas Federation of College Republicans chair
- One State Committee member from each district, elected by members of that district
- Two individuals appointed by the Chair

== Current Republican officeholders ==
Members of the Republican Party currently hold both U.S. Senate seats; three of the four U.S. House seats; four of six statewide offices, and a majority in both the Kansas House of Representatives and the Kansas Senate.

=== Members of Congress ===
==== U.S. Senate ====
Current Senators:

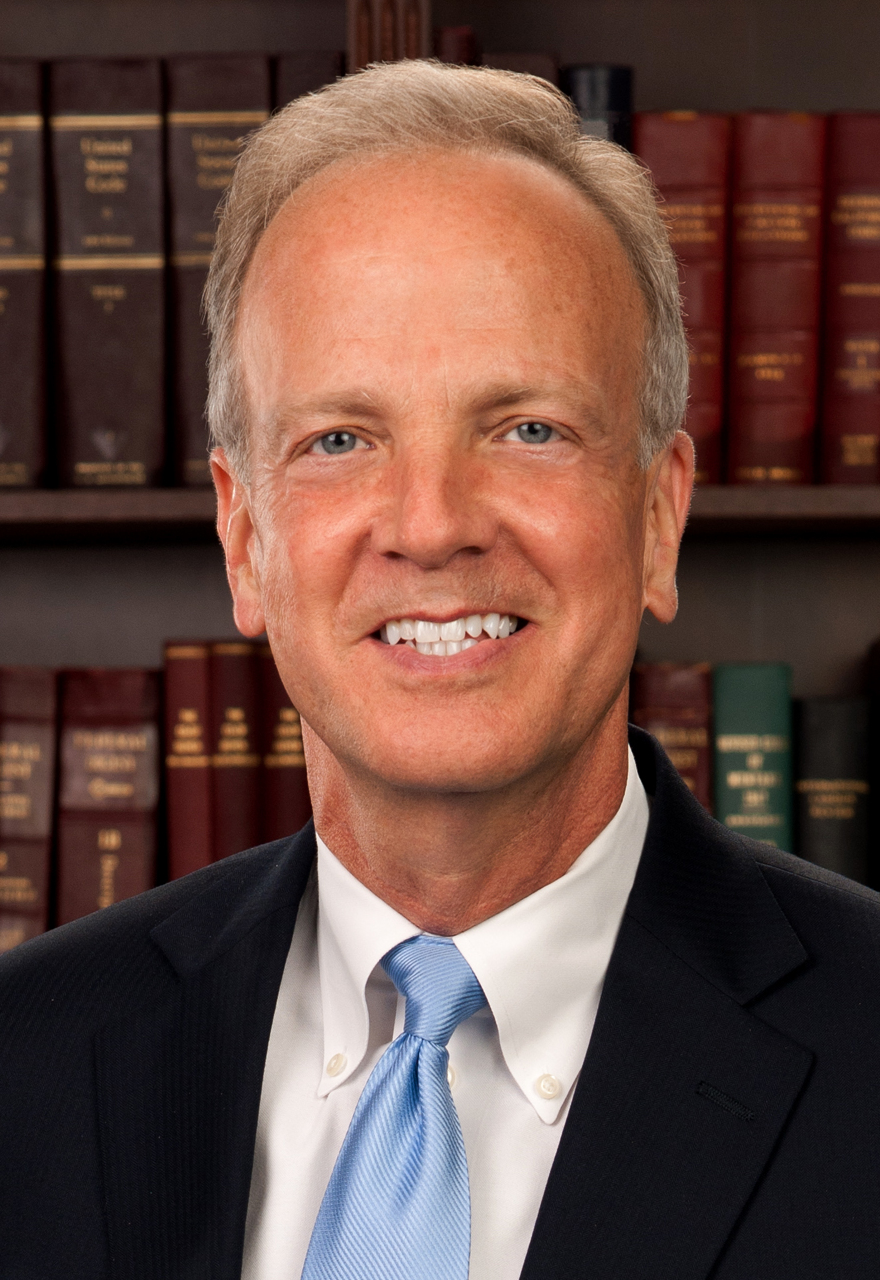
Senior U.S. Senator Jerry Moran

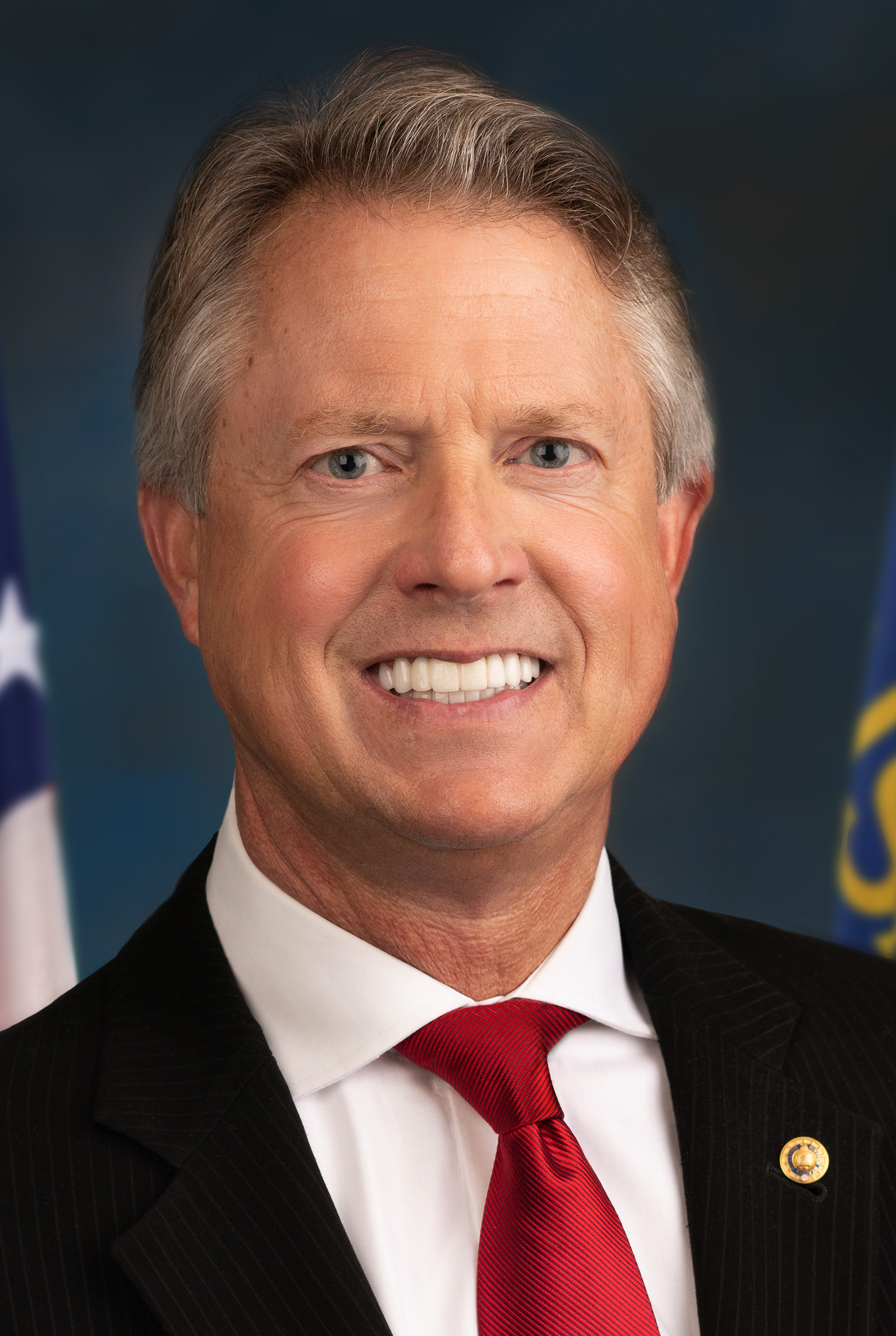
Junior U.S. Senator Roger Marshall

==== U.S. House of Representatives ====
Current House members:

District	Member	Photo
1st	Tracey Mann	
2nd	Derek Schmidt	
4th	Ron Estes	

=== Statewide offices ===
- Secretary of State: Scott Schwab
- Attorney General: Kris Kobach
- State Treasurer: Steven Johnson
- Insurance Commissioner: Vicki Schmidt

=== State legislature ===
==== Kansas Senate ====
- President of the Senate: Ty Masterson
- Senate Majority Leader: Chase Blasi

==== Kansas House of Representatives ====
- Speaker of the House: Daniel Hawkins
- House Majority Leader: Chris Croft

== Party history ==
=== Dominant political party of Kansas ===
The Kansas Republican Party has dominated Kansas politics since Kansas statehood in 1861. Kansas has had 45 governors: 32 Republicans, 11 Democrats and 2 Populists. Kansas has had 33 U.S. Senators: 28 Republicans, three Democrats, and two Populists. Until the election of Adam Hamilton in 2026, the last time a Democrat was elected to the U.S. Senate from Kansas was in 1932. Since 1960, the Republicans have won 107 of 131 Congressional elections and have won 71 of 93 statewide elections. The Democrats have won control of the Kansas Senate only in the 1912 election and control of the Kansas House only three times in the 1912, 1976, and 1990 elections. Beginning with the 1968 election, Kansas has consistently voted for the Republican presidential candidate and since 1860 has voted for the Republican presidential candidate 20 times, the Democrat six times and the Populist candidate once. From the 2010 to the 2016 elections, Republicans went 32–0 in Kansas's federal and statewide elections.

Currently, of the 1.9 million registered voters in Kansas, about 45% registered as members of the Republican Party, about 25% registered as members of the Democratic Party, and about 30% registered as unaffiliated with any political party.

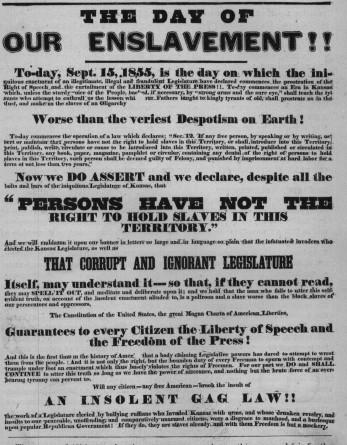
Bleeding Kansas poster protesting against the Kansas legislature to abolish slavery in the state

=== Early party history 1854 to 1974 ===
==== Territorial Kansas (1854–1860) ====
Kansas and the Republican Party owe their mutual existence to the passage of the Kansas–Nebraska Act in 1854, which repealed the Missouri Compromise. The Compromise had outlawed slavery above the 36⁰30' latitude in the Louisiana territories. Eliminating the Missouri Compromise left the question of whether Kansas would be a slave or free state up to the Kansas voters. Anti-slavery and pro-slavery settlers came into Kansas in order to influence the outcome of the first election. The conflict was violent, known to history as Bleeding Kansas. In 1855, the anti-slavery settlers organized themselves as the Free-State political party, which, in 1859, became the Kansas Republican Party.

The Kansas Republican Party was organized on May 18, 1859, at a convention held at the Jillson Hotel in Osawatomie, and was attended by Horace Greeley. When the Wyandotte Constitutional Convention met in July 1859, it consisted of 35 Republicans and 17 Democrats. It produced the Wyandotte Constitution, making Kansas a free state and was ratified by the people of Kansas on October 4, 1859. Abraham Lincoln, campaigning to be the new Republican Party's presidential nominee, visited Kansas in November and December 1859, speaking in Elwood, Troy, Atchison, and Leavenworth.

Shortly after Lincoln's visit, John A. Martin, Atchison journalist and future governor, noted "We have formed a Republican Constitution, adopted it with Republican votes, sent a Republican delegate to bear it to the National Capital, [and] elected Republican State Officers and a Republican State Legislature." No place, he added, was "as thoroughly Republican" as Kansas.

==== Basic party organization (1859–1908) ====
State Conventions: At the state level the party would hold a state convention in every general election year, and a second convention in presidential election years. The convention was usually in Topeka. The State Convention consisted of delegates, the number determined by a formula. For instance in 1890, there were 564 State Convention Delegates – one delegate at-large from each county and one delegate for every 400 votes or fractional part of 400 cast for Republican presidential electors in 1888.

Until the advent of primary elections in August 1908, the convention would nominate the Republican candidates for all statewide offices, such as governor, lieutenant governor, attorney general, and at-large Congressman. Every four years, in Presidential election years, a second Convention would select the Republican presidential electors and the Kansas delegates to the Republican National Convention. Until 1912, U.S. Senators were elected by the state legislature. The Convention created committees for resolutions and the party platform, which were voted on by the convention. The convention also elected the state committee members.

Obtaining the nomination for a statewide office required the support of a majority of the state convention delegates, which, in turn, required diligent detailed effort by a network of supporters to obtain the support of the majority of precinct committeemen in enough counties to win a majority of the delegates. An example of this process occurred in January 1904 when Governor Willis Bailey was working for re-nomination. On January 26, Reno County, elected a delegation that planned to support Edward Hoch as governor, followed immediately by Sumner County with the same result. A reform group called the Kansas Republican League had diligently recruited pro-Hoch precinct committeemen. On January 30, Governor Bailey announced he would not seek re-election as governor.

State Officers, and Central & Executive Committees: The state convention also elected the officers of the state party's central Committee – a chair and a secretary. The state party central committee generally consisted of one person per congressional district (seven or eight) and one person per judicial district (around 30). The state party's executive committee generally had about 11 members. The Central and Executive Committees had powers designated to them by the Party Constitution.

County and District Committees: Counties and Congressional Districts also had central committees with elected officers. Districts held conventions to nominate congressmen and counties held conventions to nominate county officials, candidates for the Kansas House, and delegates to the state convention. Until the late 1960s each of the 105 counties had one designated state representative, with the other 20 representatives distributed to counties with larger populations, resulting in several counties having two or three representatives. Senate districts consisted of one or more entire counties and held conventions to nominate the Republican Senate candidates.

As a result, district and county chairs held immense power. Before 1908, they strongly influenced who the delegates would select as the Republican candidate and with the advent of the primary system, they could give or withhold support to anyone considering a run for office, in effect, determining if there would be a primary. Furthermore, the tradition in Kansas was that county chairs controlled who received state patronage jobs in their counties. The system, however, was susceptible to change from below, if the voters installed new precinct committeemen who elected different county or district chairs.

National Committeemen: The National Committeeman was elected by the National Convention delegates for a four-year term, took office immediately after the National Convention, and tended to hold officer for long periods to build seniority and work up the National Party hierarchy. For instance, John A. Martin was National Committeeman from 1872 to 1884; Cy Leland Jr., was National Committeeman from 1884 until 1900, having served on the national Republican executive committee; and was followed by David W. Mulvane who served from 1900 to 1912, and also served on the national Republican executive committee.

==== Early statehood (1860–1890) ====
After statehood, Kansas remained a solidly Republican state for the next thirty years. The initial free-state movement established a core foundation of Republicans. During the Bleeding Kansas period many had died and towns had been sacked;– Kansas, Lincoln, John Brown, abolition, the Union Army and the Republican Party were woven together in a state narrative. Kansas sent a higher proportion of its eligible men to serve in the Union Army than any other state. Union veterans settling in Kansas after the Civil War were usually Republican and their veterans' organization, the Grand Army of the Republic (GAR) was a strong supporter of Republican candidates. Farmers acquired land through the Homestead Act of 1862, passed by Republicans. Veterans' pensions came from the national Republican administration. Railroads, and the towns they helped create, were generally supportive of Republicans. Members of the Republican Party controlled not only local school boards and judgeships, but also won the vast majority of state legislative, governor and congressional positions.

Between the 1860 and 1888 elections, of the 45 Congressional races, Republican candidates won 44 and, of the 14 Gubernatorial races, Republicans won 13. Republicans held solid majorities in the State Senate and House every year through 1888. The Presidential election of 1860, won by Abraham Lincoln, was Kansas' first participation in a national election and 79% of its vote went to Lincoln. Kansas voted for the Republican presidential candidate in every election between 1860 and 1888. The first Governor was Republican Charles Robinson, the first U.S. Senators were Republicans James Lane and Samuel Pomeroy, the first Congressman was Republican Martin F. Conway, and Republicans in the first Kansas legislature held 29 of 36 state senate seats and 63 of 74 state representative seats.

One of the major issues facing the Republican party during this time was prohibition. While most Republicans supported temperance, prohibition – legal restrictions on alcohol – was more problematic. In the late 1870s, the party split over the issue – those who supported temperance but not prohibition led by John Martin and the more radical prohibition supporters led by John St John. The St John faction won out, St John was twice elected governor, in 1878 and 1880, and Kansas imposed prohibition by Constitutional amendment in 1880. During the 1882 election, St John tried for a third term but was defeated when many "wet" Republicans refused to back him for a third term. In 1884, the state party convention nominated John A. Martin by acclimation and placed upon him the responsibility of rehabilitating the party and reconciling factional conflicts which had developed over prohibition. Martin endorsed prohibition arguing that his goal was to elect Republicans and prohibition had passed with a majority vote of the people. Martin was elected governor in 1884 and in 1886 was re-nominated by acclamation at the state Republican Convention and re-elected as governor.

Republicans pursued policies that at the time were considered radical. In 1882, the Republican State party convention adopted a platform that supported woman's suffrage. The same convention nominated E.P. McCabe to run for state auditor, an election he won, becoming the first African-American elected to a statewide office outside of reconstruction. He was re-elected in 1884. In 1888, republican Alfred Farifax became the first African-American elected to the state house. In 1887, republican Susanna "Dora" Salter became the first woman elected to an executive position in American history, when she was elected mayor of Argonia.

==== Republicans vs Populists (1890–1898) ====
The political movement called "populism", represented by the People's Party, exploded onto the Kansas political scene in the 1890s. Its primary base were farmers suffering from a combination of bad weather and an economic depression. It took the form of radical agrarianism hostile to banks, railroads, established interests and political parties. Its general political agenda called for a pro-debtor fiscal policy; the abolition of national banks; a graduated income tax; political reform through the direct election of Senators and civil service reform; and regulation of monopoly pricing through Government control of all railroads, telegraphs, and telephones.

In the late 1880s, a national farmers advocacy organization, the Farmers Alliance, grew in influence holding large national conventions. In 1890, through the clever and deft political maneuvering of political operatives, many from Kansas, the Farmer's Alliance became the People's or Populist Party, an organization dedicated to electing its members to office. In the 1890s the Populist movement was extremely successful in Kansas, but its inability to organize for effective legislative action doomed it to failure. The Republican Party responded by effectively countering the People's Party, the organization formed to channel the populist movement. Republicans split the populists on wedge issues such as prohibition and woman's suffrage, questioned the competence of populists to hold elected office, relied on the depth and tradition of Republican support among leading citizens; organized the grassroots level through Commercial and Republican Clubs, and partially adopted an agenda that addressed issues raised by the Populists. The result was wide swings in political control between the Populists who partially prevailed in 1890 and 1892; and controlled all state government in 1896 and the Republicans who regained control in 1894 and then permanently defeated the Populists in 1898 and 1900.

===== 1890 election cycle =====
In the 1890 election, the Republicans went from 121 State Representatives to 26, a loss of 95 seats, and from holding all seven Congressional seats to holding two. The Kansas legislature then elected a Populist as U.S. Senator. The Populists probably would have elected a governor also, but a confused effort allowed the Republican candidate to win a plurality of the vote.

===== 1892 election cycle =====
In the 1892 election, the Republicans gained 39 House seats for a total of 65 seats, a bare majority; went from 38 Senate seats to 15; held only two of eight Congressional seats, lost the governorship, and Kansas voted for the Populist presidential candidate. The makeup of the House was disputed resulting in the "Populist War." In the 1893 Session, the Populist members and the Republican members held simultaneous sessions, each claiming to have the majority. The Populist governor called out the militia, but since most of them were Republicans they refused to obey orders. The dispute was resolved by the Supreme Court, which, in a partisan vote, gave the majority to the Republicans.

===== 1894 election cycle =====
In the 1894 election, the Republicans gained 27 more House seats for a total of 92; won seven of eight Congressional seats, and regained the governorship. The Populists, however, still held a majority in the state senate. There were several reasons for this electoral turn-around. First, there was a public backlash to the circus-like antics of the 1893 legislative session. Second, the Populists sought to ease off on prohibition and women's suffrage, splitting their base vote. Last, the Republicans successfully prevented a fusion ticket of Populists and Democrats. Populists were in favor of woman's suffrage while Democrats opposed it. Republican leader Cy Leland convinced the Democrats to run their own gubernatorial candidate splitting the opposition vote.

===== 1896 election cycle =====
In the 1896 election, the Populists and the Democrats merged efforts to form a Fusion Party and the Republicans lost 43 House seats for a total of 49; won only two of eight Congressional seats; lost the Governorship; the legislature elected a Populist to the U.S. Senate seat; and Kansas voted for William Jennings Bryan, the Democratic candidate for president. In August 1896 William Allen White, editor of the Emporia Gazette, wrote his famous editorial "What's the Matter with Kansas" criticizing the Populist movement.

===== 1898 election cycle =====
In the 1898 election, the Republicans regained power, gaining 43 House seats for a total of 92; won seven of eight Congressional seats; and won the governorship, when William Stanley defeated populist incumbent John Leedy. Mort Albaugh, chairman of the Republican State Committee, was responsible for organizing the Republican effort that overthrew the Populist movement in Kansas. As a final step, the Republicans won a large majority in the 1900 State Senate election. The Populists, as a political organization, faded away after 1898 but their ideas and the issues that provoked this political uprising remained.

===== 1900 election cycle =====
In 1900, the Republicans finished their restoration to power by winning seven of eight Congressional districts, the Governor and all statewides, and a majority in the state Senate and state House. In the 1901 session, with control of both houses of the legislature, the Republicans legislatively prevented future fusion tickets between Populists and Democrats by prohibiting any person to "accept more than one nomination for the same office" and that "the name of each candidate shall be printed on the ballot once and no more."

==== Standpatters vs Insurgents: progressive period (1900–1918) ====
The Kansas Republican Party that emerged in 1900 from the Populist period was a changed organization. The new reality was that it could no longer rely on "waving the bloody shirt," that is recalling the Civil War period, as most voters no longer had personal experience with War. Moreover, the demographic and economic make-up of Kansas was changing, creating new political issues and new constituencies—changes that fueled the Populist movement, were still strong in Kansas, and that Republicans needed to address.

The Republicans successfully met the challenge of this new environment. From the 1900 to 1910 elections, Republicans won every gubernatorial and U.S. Senate election, 47 of 48 Congressional elections and solid majorities in the Kansas House and Senate.

The major characteristic of Kansas political history during this period was reform agitation through factional maneuvering within the Republican Party, not, as in the 1890s, by third party political movements. Although this period was named the Progressive Era, there was no distinctive philosophy or body or principles that guided political activities. Instead, recombinations of factions within the republican party were the distinctive characteristic of the time, throughout all of which expansion of governmental services and responsibilities was the rule

===== The factions =====
There were several factions in the Republican Party that competed for power. During the 1900 and 1902 elections the two main factions were the "Machine," "Bosses," or "Old Crowd", of Cy Leland, Mort Albaugh, and future U.S. Senator Chester Long, which fought for control with the "Young Crowd", which also called itself the "Boss Busters," of future U.S. Senator Joseph R. Burton, David Mulvane, and future U.S. Senator and Vice President Charles Curtis. In the 1904 election, Walter Stubbs, future Governor, was elected to the state House and joined the Boss Buster faction.

In 1906, when faction leader U.S. Senator Joseph Burton was convicted and forced to resign, his faction broke in two. One group, including Charles Curtis, joined the machine faction and together became known as the stand-patters or "regulars." The other group became the progressives, strong supporters of President Roosevelt, often called Square Dealers and included future Governors Edward Hoch and Walter Stubbs, U.S. Senator Joseph Bristow, Congressmen Edmond Madison and Victor Murdock, and journalists like William Allen White.

In the 1908 and 1910 elections, the Progressives and Standpatters intensely competed for power and election issues become more intertwined with national politics. The primary election process, first used in 1908, allowed progressives to take over, ousting U.S. Senator Chester Long in 1908, and defeating four standpatter congressmen in the 1910 primary elections. The rivalry became so intense that in the 1912 election, Progressives and Standpatters split over presidential electors and the Republican candidates were swept from power by the democrats. In 1913, some progressives, including William Allen White, Henry Allen, and Victor Murdock formed a separate Progressive Party. Other progressives like U.S. Senator Joseph Bristow and future Goveronor and U.S. Senator Arthur Capper refuse to break with the Republican Party. In the 1914 election the Progressive candidates lost across the board to Republican candidates who returned to power throughout Kansas. Younger members who later rose to prominence included governor and presidential candidate Alf Landon and governor and U.S. Senator Clyde Reed.

Progressives sought to solve problems that flowed from the new industrialized order, targeting giant corporations and corrupt political bosses who they felt had stolen America from its people. They viewed government intervention on behalf of the people as their primary tool of reform. They sought to use government power to limit the concentrated economic power of large business monopolies like the railroads and Standard Oil. They pushed for more direct grassroots involvement in government, favoring, for instance, primary elections over convention-nominated candidates to minimize the influence of political bosses, recall elections, lobbyist reform, campaign finance reporting, and civil service reform to reduce political patronage. They generally favored the use of government power to improve public morality favoring, for instance, strict prohibition, banning cigarettes, and restricting dancing. They tried to use government power to improve public health by implementing modern scientific techniques. Last, they adopted scientific management techniques from business to modernize government to make it more efficient and effective.

A third group of Republicans were grassroots organizations that focused on contemporary social issues like prohibition, Carrie Nation and her hatchet attacks on saloons were emblematic of this group, or woman's suffrage. In 1912, with the support of all parts of the Republican Party, and partially as a way to strengthen the prohibition movement, the Kansas Constitution was amended to give women the right to vote.

===== 1900–1908 election cycles =====
In 1900, the Insurgents controlled the state party convention and William Stanley was again elected governor. In 1902 the Old Guard was back in control, and Willis Bailey was elected governor. In 1904 and 1906, the Insurgents regained control of the state party convention and Edward W. Hoch was elected and re-elected governor.

Primary elections were adopted in a special legislative session in January 1908 and the first primary election held in August 1908. In 1908, Walter Stubbs was elected governor and Joseph Bristow, a progressive, was elected to the U.S. Senate after defeating incumbent establishment Republican Chester Long in the first primary. Inb the 1910 primary progressives challenged all seven Congressman and unseated four.

===== 1910 election cycle =====
In August 1910, factionalism reached new intensity and there were fierce primary battles for every federal and statewide office. The 1910 Congressional general election slate went from six "Regulars" and two "Insurgents" to two "Regulars" and six "Insurgents." One commentator observed: "Kansas fired a shot that will be heard around the country. The prairies are afire with insurgency. What does it profit a StandPat Congressman if he saves his face in Washington and loses his hide in Kansas?" Walter Stubbs won re-election as governor.

===== 1912 election cycle – fractured party =====
In 1912, factionalism exacerbated by the national Howard Taft – Theodore Roosevelt split, caused the two Kansas Republican factions to split the party with members of the Insurgent faction running their own candidates in some elections in opposition to the Kansas Republican Party's official candidate. Many Republican voters did not vote, resulting in lower voter turnout than in 1908. As a result, the Republicans lost the gubernatorial race, by 29 votes, lost control of the State Senate and House, and lost five of eight Congressional seats. Democratic presidential candidate Woodrow Wilson won Kansas. Former Governor Walter Stubbs defeated incumbent U.S. Senator Charles Curtis in the primary election, but then lost to the Democrat in the general election. In December, some Kansas Republicans attended a meeting in Chicago to form a separate Progressive Party.

===== 1914 and 1916 election cycles, party reuniting =====
In 1914, most of the Progressive faction rejoined the Kansas Republican Party, although some, like Henry Allen, broke away and joined a new, separate "Progressive Party". As a result, in 1914 the Republicans regained control of the House. In 1916, after the break-away progressives rejoined republican ranks, the Republicans regained control of the State Senate and won seven of eight Congressional seats. Arthur Capper, a former newspaper editor and member of the progressive faction, was elected governor in 1914 and again in 1916 (he had lost in 1912) and brought the two factions together. Governor Capper gained support from the grassroots by making Kansas a "bone-dry" state (no alcoholic beverages at all). He gained support from the establishment by imposing fiscally conservative policies such as paying off all state debt in 1916. He retained support from progressives by signing, for example, legislation strengthening Blue Sky securities laws and workers compensation. He was the first governor to describe government reforms using business concepts such as being in favor of "modern scientific business methods, in the elimination of useless positions and requiring the highest efficiency on the part of every public servant" and noted that the burden of taxation had "increased at an alarming rate without commensurate benefit to the public."

===== Campaign operations =====
In the 1918 gubernatorial campaign, the Republican candidate, Henry Allen, was still in France. His campaign manager, Harvey H. Motter of Wichita, a traveling salesman, decided, through necessity, to forego the traditional campaign of personal visits by the candidate and campaigning through surrogates – prominent local citizens – and instead relied on networks of local volunteers and numerous local contributions. The new campaign style succeeded and was copied by future candidates of both parties.

==== Optimism, prosperity and the new conservatives (1918–1930) ====
Throughout the 1920s, Kansans held an optimistic belief that the material aspects of life were steadily improving, evidenced by, for instance, higher incomes, higher crop yields, science, industry, better roads, schools, more efficient farming, electricity, and cars. They believed that thrift, self-sufficiency and wholesome living were keys to this success. Republicans positioned themselves as the party of the proud past and the architects of the current and future prosperity. They were the party of prosperity, good roads, child welfare, and public safety, with necessary periodic reforms of government to keep taxes low and programs effective.

The voters agreed with this proposition. Between 1918 and 1930, Republicans held the governorship for all but one term, their majority in the State Senate never dropped below 30 and was as high as 37 of 40 seats, in the Kansas House the number of Republicans was never below 90 and was as high as 113 of 125 seats. Republicans held at least seven of the eight Congressional seats every election and held both U.S. Senate seats. Among several reforms enacted in the 1920s were government funded kindergarten, creation of the Board of Regents, and, after a major political battle, a constitutional amendment in 1928 that allowed the state government to pay for a highway system. Until then, roads and other internal improvements were county and township responsibilities.

In the 1920s, the party still consisted of two factions, usually labeled conservative and progressive, which manifested itself in gubernatorial election politics. Between 1904 and 1920, all Republican governor candidates had come from the progressive wing. But a new generation of conservatives entered Kansas politics, most World War One veterans and members of the American Legion. John D. M. Hamilton, Clifford R. Hope, and Frank "Chief" Haucke were representative members of this new group who challenged the older progressive politicians.

In the 1918 and 1920 elections, Henry Allen, a progressive, was elected governor. In 1922, after a seven-way primary, the Republican candidate was conservative William Y. Morgan. He lost to the Democratic candidate, a victim of a severe farm recession and probable desertion of some progressive Republican voters. In 1924, conservative Benjamin Paulen beat out progressives Clyde Reed and former Governor Walter Stubbs to win the nomination. Paulen went on to win the governorship defeating both the Democrat and William Allen White, who ran as an independent attacking the Ku Klux Klan. Paulen was re-elected easily in 1926. In 1928, Clyde Reed, a progressive, won out in a six-way primary, with his closest opponent being John D. M. Hamilton, a young conservative war veteran and Speaker of the House.

In 1930, as the depression began, Governor Clyde Reed was defeated in the primary by Frank Hauke, a young conservative war veteran and head of the American Legion, who was supported by David Mulvane, John D. M. Hamilton, John W. Breyfogle, and William Y. Morgan. Hauke lost the gubernatorial race to the Democratic candidate by 200 votes, in a race that also included John R. Brinkley, the "goat gland doctor", running as an independent. Alf Landon, future governor and presidential candidate, started firmly in the progressive camp, helping the Allen and White campaigns, and serving as Reed's campaign manager in 1928, but by the end of the 1920s had become disenchanted with progressive ideology.

==== Role of the party chair ====
In the first half of the twentieth century, the state party chair was elected every two years at the state party convention, which was held two weeks after the primary. The accepted practice was that the Republican gubernatorial candidate selected the chair, who was elected and then served as the campaign manager for the governor's campaign. The chair would raise funds, accompany the candidate, and work with county chairs to turn out the vote. Once the campaign ended, the state party chair became a de facto assistant governor, fending off job seekers, coordinating state and federal patronage, serving as a liaison with legislators and party officials, and gathering political intelligence to help the legislative program. At this time the legislature met every two years, in the non-election year. In January of the election year, candidates would network and announce their candidacies at the Kansas Day social events in Topeka, an event the party chair would attend. This would initiate the primary election campaigns and the cycle would start again.

==== Depression and the New Deal (1930–1936) ====
The stock market crash of October 1929 marked the start of the decade-long economic downturn known as the Great Depression, which took hold in Kansas between the 1930 and 1932 elections. Kansas voters concluded that the Republican agenda of rigorous austerity in government, cutting government size, and reducing taxes was not working and needed to be supplemented by other programs – programs of the type offered by the national Democrats.

Between 1930 and 1938 the Kansas Republican Party sustained a period of political decline. Republicans lost the governorship in 1930 and 1936. Alf Landon, elected governor in 1932, had managed to balance the state's budget and to be re-elected in 1934, the only Republican governor in the nation re-elected. On that basis he became the Republican presidential candidate for 1936, but lost his home state in the election. A Democrat won a special election and in 1932 was re-elected as U.S. Senator. The Republicans held four of the seven Congressional seats in 1932–36. In the State House, Republicans dropped from 101 representatives after the 1928 election to between 65 and 75 seats, a bare majority. In the Senate, they dropped from 37 seats to 26 seats in 1932 and 24 seats in 1936.

In response, Kansas Republicans changed to reflect the popular will and adopted more expansive government-backed economic agenda, while maintaining strict prohibition, even after national prohibition was removed in 1932. Landon, a self-described "pragmatic progressive", demonstrated the Kansas Republican Party's capacity to adapt to the new realities of the Depression and remain the majority party. Some of the reforms instituted by Republicans were passage of a state income tax in 1933, passage of a state sales tax in 1937, and requiring all local government entities to use a standard accounting and auditing system.

In 1937 women were added to the statutory party structure by the addition of three provisions: (1) each precinct would now elect one precinct committeewoman in addition to the committeeman, (2) county, district and state committees would now elect a vice-chair, in addition to the chair, secretary and treasurer, with the requirement that the chair and vice-chair be of opposite gender, and (3) the National Committeewoman was added to the party council. This was codified in KS Statute 25-221, with the opposite gender requirement at 25-221a.

==== Alf Landon and the Republican establishment (1938–1955) ====
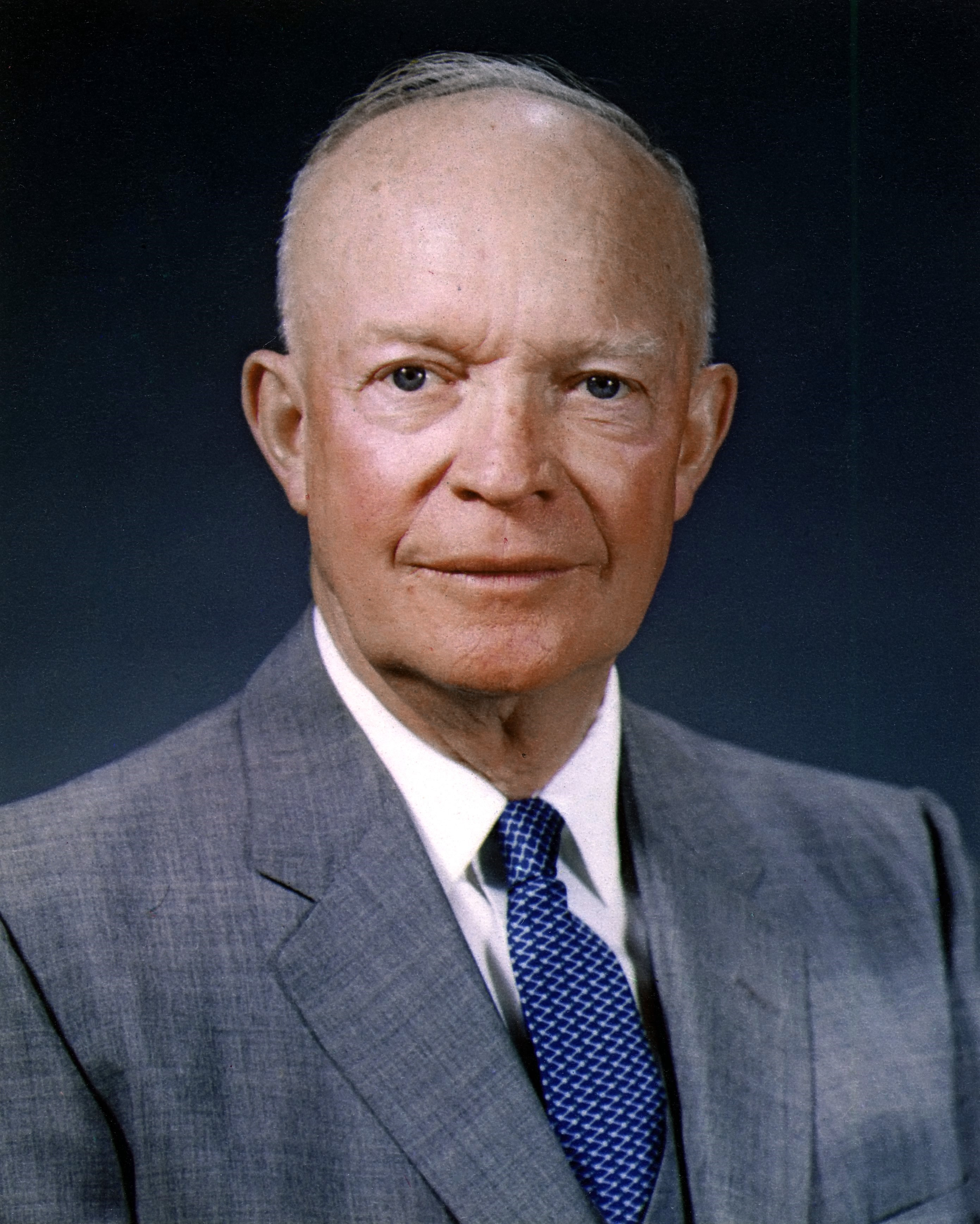
President Dwight D. Eisenhower (1953–1959)

After the loss of the Governor's race in 1936 and wanting a solid anti-New Deal front, the Republican gathering for the 1937 Kansas Day became a major planning session to regroup and reorganize the party. The leaders of this effort turned the tide and then ran the party for the next 15 years. Prominent behind-the-scenes players included Dane G. Hansen of Logan, Harry Darby (future national committeeman and U.S. Senator) and Lacy Haynes (prominent writer for the K.C. Star) of Kansas City, Harm Voss of Downs, Walter Fees (future party chair) of Iola, Dick Robbins of Pratt, Lester McCoy of Garden City, and Jess Harper of Sitka. Other leaders of the rejuvenation were Blake Williamson, Ed Boddington, and Art Stanley from Kansas City; Dolph Simons, Sr. (owner of the Lawrence newspaper), and Charles Stowe of Lawrence; Drew McLaughlin of Paola; Senator Harris from Ottawa; Watson Marple of Fort Scott; W.R. Hagman of Pittsburg; Mrs. Effie Semple (future national committeewoman) of Columbus; Rolla Clymer, Dick Woodward, and Gale Moss of Eldorado; Ernie Shawver, Edward F. Arn (future governor), Pat Patterson, George A. Brown, and Wash Loston of Wichita; Stewart Newlin of Sumner County; Kirke E. Dale and George Templar of Arkansas City; Wes Roberts (future party chair) of Oskaloosa; Paul Wunsch (future state senate president pro tem) of Kingman; Wayne Rogler of Chase County; Hugh Edwards of Eureka; Jess Denious of Dodge City; Lester McCoy and Cap Burtis of Garden City; Ernie Briles of Stafford; Andrew Frank Schoeppel (future governor and U.S. Senator) of Ness City; Congressman Frank Carlson (future governor and U.S. Senator) and Edward Burge of Concordia; McDill "Huck" Boyd (future national committeeman) of Phillipsburg; Wint Smith (future Congressman) of Mankato; Henry Buzik of Sylvan Grove; Ben Bernie of Hill City; Tuffy Lutz of Sharon Springs; Frank "Chief" Haucke of Council Grove; Warren Shaw, Mark Bennett and Harry Crane (future party chair) of Topeka; Casey Jones of Olathe; Jay Parker of Hill City; Ross Beach, Murray Eddy and Ed Flood of Hays; Charles Cushing of Downs; Albert M. Cole of Jackson County (later 1st District Congressman); William Beck of Holton; Dick Becker of Coffeyville; John Wall of Sedan; Charles Arbuthnot of Lebanon; C.I. Moyer (future party chair) of Doniphan County; Lloyd Ruppenthal (future party chair) and Adrian Smith of McPherson; Lee Larabee of Liberal; Roy Smith of Edmund, O.O. Osborne of Stockton; and August Lauterbach of Colby.

By November 1938, Kansas voters were disenchanted with the distant aggregation of power in Washington and the marked tendency of urban dwellers on the east coast to belittle Kansas, referring to it as "backward," "unprogressive," "unsophisticated," and "antediluvian." While some parts of the country continued to support the New Deal, the common opinion in Kansas was to view it as a wasteful intrusion of government bureaucracy by arrogant and ignorant easterners. An October 1938 poll indicated that 59% of Kansans disapproved of Roosevelt. This feeling burst out in the 1938 elections where Republicans regained the U.S. Senate seat, when former Governor Clyde M. Reed defeated the Democratic incumbent, won six of seven Congressional seats, and went from 74 seats to 107 of the 125 seats in the Kansas House. In the 1940 election Republicans went from 24 to 35 of the 40 seats in the Kansas Senate.

Throughout the 1940s and early 1950s Republicans firmly controlled Kansas Government. Every Governor was Republican and won re-election: Payne Ratner (1938 and 1940 elections), Andrew Frank Schoeppel (1942 and 1944 elections); Frank Carlson (1946 and 1948 elections), and Edward F. Arn (1950 and 1952 elections). After U.S. Senator Clyde M. Reed died in office on 1949, Harry Darby was appointed to finish the term and former Governor Frank Carlson was elected in 1950 as U.S. Senator and went on to serve three complete terms, before retiring. U.S. Senator Arthur Capper, having served five full terms was succeeded by former Governor Andrew Schoeppel who won the 1948 election and served two complete terms before dying in office during his third term. In the State House, of the 125 seats Republicans always held between 90 and 107 seats; in the State Senate, of the 40 seats, Republicans held between 34 and 39 seats.

This smooth continuity was the result of intense behind-the-scenes efforts by party leaders to achieve consensus. Alf Landon, as governor from 1932 to 1935, and presidential candidate in 1936, was a national Republican leader and, until 1948, generally controlled the Kansas Republican party. He backed Payne Ratner, Andrew Schoeppel and his former campaign manager, Frank Carlson for governor, as well as Clyde M. Reed for U.S. Senator in 1938 and 1944. He was the Kansas Republican national convention delegation leader in 1940 and 1944 and selected the delegation's members. Landon, however, was challenged by Andrew Schoeppel who announced that in 1948 he would run for U.S. Senate against Landon's choice, the aging Arthur Capper. This dispute resulted in a fracture in the state party, with many of Landon's former supporters refusing to back Capper. In January 1948, the state party central committee changed the rules for selecting national delegates in a way that diminished Landon's influence, resulting in only six of the 18 delegates being Landon supporters. Harry Darby, an Andrew Schoeppel supporter, was re-elected national committeeman and elected chair of the delegation. Senator Arthur Capper, aged 83, then decided not to file for re-election and Landon was left without direct political power, but remained an elder statesman for years.

==== "Young Turk" insurgents (1952–1960) ====
===== Emergence of the Young Turks =====
The 1952 election saw the emergence of a new Republican faction – the "Young Turks" – which included state senator and future Governor John Anderson; Lieutenant Governor and future Governor Fred Hall; Senator John Woelk; Senator William Weygand; Senator John Crutcher (Hutchinson), future state party chair and U.S. Senator James Pearson; Representative John Glades; and future state party chair Donald Schnacke. They took on the "Old Guard" establishment, which included Governor Edward Arn, U.S. Senator Frank Carlson, U.S. Senator Andrew Schoeppel, Congressman Ed Reese, Wesley Roberts, Senator Steadman Ball, Senator Paul Wunsch (who was President Pro Tem of the Senate from 1949 to 1964), McDill "Huck" Boyd, and Harry Darby (National Committeeman from 1940 to 1964), and who controlled the patronage system and party structure. The Young Turks resented the perceived abuses of patronage, political deal-making, and cronyism as well as the power county party chairs had to control patronage and influence elections. A common motivation was to "clean-up the mess in Topeka."

Fred Hall was elected lieutenant governor in 1950 and again in 1952, defeating Wayne Ryan a veteran senator and friend of Governor Arn. In 1954, Hall was elected governor, beating Old Guard candidate George Templar. He did not owe his election success to the party establishment, clashed with, and refused to work with party leaders. Exacerbating this new factional fighting, was President Eisenhower's January 1953 appointment of C. Wesley Roberts as chair of the Republican National committee. Roberts was a Kansas newspaperman, former Kansas state party chair, U.S. Senator Frank Carlson's 1950 campaign manager, and an old-fashioned party loyalist who could work the patronage system. A KC Star article, however, exposed that Roberts possibly improperly took money to transfer property to the state and he resigned, giving the Young Turks more ammunition in their fight with the establishment.

The effects of these disputes were felt in the 1954 election where the Republican hold on the Kansas House dropped from 105 to 89 seats. The 1954 election was also the first to make use of political advertising on television.

===== 1956 election cycle =====
As resistance to Governor Hall grew, he sought to control the party structure. The state chair, Lloyd Ruppenthal, had been his campaign manager and a supporter, but fought Hall's attempts to take control of state patronage away from county chairs, supporting the traditional power of county chairs to control patronage. Hall sought to oust National Committeeman Harry Darby and control the delegates going to the 1956 National Convention. The State Convention, however, re-elected Darby as National Committeeman and Mrs. Semple as National Committeewoman – breaking tradition by doing it before the convention. They also elected chair Ruppenthal as a delegate, and he refused Governor Hall's demand that Ruppenthal resign as state chair.

In the 1956 legislative session, the Republican legislature passed Right-to-Work legislation only to have Governor Hall veto it. The Republican State Committee passed a resolution supporting "Right to Work", condemning the governor for his veto. Hall was soundly defeated in the 1956 primary by Clyde Reed Jr., which was particularly vitriolic in tone. This helped Democrat George Docking win the governorship in the 1956 election. In January 1957, with two weeks left in his governor's term, Hall resigned and his former lieutenant governor, now governor, John McCuish, appointed Hall to a recent Kansas Supreme Court vacancy. This insider crony deal became known as the "Triple Play" and brought more embarrassment to the Republican Party.

===== 1958 election cycle =====
Republican dominance continued to decline with the 1958 election. George Docking became the first two-term Democratic governor in Kansas history. There were several reasons for this: serious intra-Republican factional fighting distracted the party, the right-to-work Constitutional amendment was on the ballot in 1958 which galvanized Democratic turnout, demographic changes undercut the Republican base resulting in fewer farms and a decline in rural population, growth of larger towns and cities; and an economic shift towards non-agricultural trade and industry. Additionally, George Docking successfully positioned himself as more fiscally conservative than his Republican opponents, defining himself as a stringent fiscal conservative, seeking fiscal sanity, supporter of law and order, but a social moderate. In 1958, Docking campaigned on repealing the 0.5% increase in the state sales tax enacted by the Republican legislature.

Of the six Congressional seats, the Democrats picked up two new seats, splitting the delegation – three to three. Republicans lost 14 seats in the Kansas House, leaving them with just 69 out of 125 seats. The voters of Kansas, however, remained conservative in outlook. In 1958, despite opposition from Democrats, unions, some clergy, university professors, and Governor Docking, Kansas voters approved a constitutional Right-To-Work Amendment, a proposition rejected by many other states.

===== 1960 election cycle =====
In 1960, John Anderson, one of the Young Turks, was elected governor, defeating McDill "Huck" Boyd, the party establishment's candidate, in the primary and Democrat George Docking, trying for a third term, in the general. This victory restored Republican control and consolidated a generational shift to new Republican leadership. The Republicans continued to hold both U.S. Senate seats, five of six Congressional seats, a gain of two, 32 State Senate seats, and gained 13 seats in the House. Anderson's campaign manager, James Pearson, became the State Party chair. The 1960 election was when Bob Dole was first elected to Congress with the support of his mentor McDill "Huck" Boyd and Dane Hansen, in the Sixth District – northwest Kansas.

==== Social changes and an expanding federal government (1960–1974) ====
In the 1960s, new issues came to the forefront – the Vietnam War, international communism, government's expanded role in social welfare, changing sexual morality and gender relations, and civil rights for minorities. Throughout the 1960s, the Republican Party maintained a working majority in state government. They held both U.S. Senate seats, almost always held all five Congressional seats, held majorities in both legislative chambers, with around 85 seats in the House and 30 seats in the Senate. Republicans won the governorship in the 1960, 1962, and 1964 elections, but lost it in 1966, 1968, and 1970.

One of the contributing factors to the loss in 1966 was the magnitude of change achieved by the Republican administrations in the first half of the decade. The state school system was completely re-engineered with thousands of school districts consolidated, a new State School Board created, and a new educational finance system created. Redistricting, based on one-man, one-vote, became a major topic in the legislature. To pay for the education reforms, state income tax withholding was imposed and the state sales tax was increased. There were also a plethora of social issues before the legislature including birth control, civil rights, and fair housing.

===== 1964 election cycle - first conservative insurgency =====
In the Kansas Republican party, a new Conservative faction emerged that was inspired by Arizona Senator Barry Goldwater. This faction, taking the approach of other insurgent factions, recruited new precinct leaders and managed to gain working control of the state party by 1964. The part of Goldwater's message that resonated with many Kansans Republicans was ineffective and wasteful big government programs and interference in the marketplace. It was similar to the message articulated by Arthur Capper and Alf Landon in the 1930s. The arguments, however, were now stronger, with much higher taxes and much large social welfare programs. Goldwater's national supporters included Ronald Reagan and Phyllis Schlafly.

Republican leadership in Kansas was split on the Presidential choice for 1964. At the April 1964 party convention in Topeka, Governor John Anderson and Senator James Pearson supported Nelson Rockefeller, Congressman Clifford Hope favored Henry Cabot Lodge Jr., Congressman Bob Dole and conservative business leader Gorden Greb supported Goldwater. The Kansas Republican Party delegates threw their support to Goldwater. In an unprecedented move, the party denied its own governor, John Anderson, a position as a voting delegate to the 1964 Republican National Convention held in San Francisco, and described as the ugliest since 1912, as entrenched moderates faced off against conservative insurgents. In an era in which a national consensus seemed to have coalesced around advancing civil rights, containing Communism and expanding government, the moderates believed they had to win to preserve the Republican Party. The conservatives wanted to contain the role of the federal government and roll back Communism.

Barry Goldwater did not win the Kansas Presidential vote in 1964, but he won a substantial minority (45%). His loss motivated his core supporters to create a distinctively conservative voice in Kansas, but after 1964, the conservative faction lost some support. The average Kansas voter had contradictory feelings on federal programs. While they voiced support for individual self-sufficiency and attacked government interference and high taxes, they took full advantage of social security and medicare for the elderly, farm subsidies, small business loans, and road and community development funding.

The 1964 Kansas Republican Governor's primary, which chose Governor Anderson's successor, was probably the most "power-packed" in state history. There were eight candidates with six being political powers: William Avery, Congressman, who won the primary and the general elections; Paul Wunsch, state senator, former Speaker, and 28-year legislative veteran; Harold Chase, the Lieutenant Governor; McDill "Huck" Boyd, newspaper publisher, activist, and ally of Congressman Bob Dole; William Ferguson, the Attorney General; and Grant Dohm, three-term legislator.

===== 1966 election cycle =====
In the 1966 elections, Congressman Bob Dole and U.S. Senator James Pearson, both prevailed in their primaries. Pearson suspected that the Goldwater or conservative faction encouraged Congressman Ellsworth, from the party's liberal wing, to run against him in the primary.

In the same election, Republican Governor William Avery lost his re-election bid to Democrat Robert Docking (son of Governor George Docking). Docking campaigned on an agenda of lower taxes, austere government, and law and order. Avery, the Republican, campaigned on the major expansion of education funding under his administration but was left defending the increase in sales taxes, the imposition of income tax withholding, and higher liquor and cigarette taxes.

===== 1968 election cycle =====
In 1968, at the urging of retiring Senator Frank Carlson, Congressman Bob Dole defeated former governor William Avery in the primary and went on to be elected U.S. Senator. In 1968, Kansas voted for Nixon in the presidential race. Republicans won all five Congressional seats, gained five seats in the State Senate, gained 11 seats in the State House, but lost the Governor's race to Robert Docking who ran on an agenda of fiscal responsibility, tax reform, and executive branch reorganization.

===== Party as a campaign organization (late 1960s and early 1970s) =====
After the election losses to Robert Docking, the state party was viewed as an ineffective campaign organization, having lost focus on its primary role of electing Republicans and instead serving as a battleground where each faction fought to get supporters elected as precinct leaders, county officers, and delegates. In contrast, the Democrat Docking had run a thoroughly modern and focused campaign with polling, mass media advertising, and effective use of TV. The conclusion drawn by most Kansas candidates was that mass media was better at voter mobilization than party precinct organizations and that the party organization was being replaced by individual political entrepreneurs and consultants running candidate-centered campaigns.

===== 1970 election cycle =====
- U.S. Senate: There was no U.S. Senate Election
- U.S. Congress: Republican incumbent Keith Sebelius won re-election in the 1st District; Democrat Bill Roy upset Republican incumbent Chester Mize in the 2nd District, Republican incumbent Larry Winn won re-election in the 3rd District; Republican incumbent Garner Shriver won the 4th District, and Republican incumbent Joe Skubitz won re-election in the 5th District
- Kansas Statewide: Democrat Robert Docking won re-election as governor for an unprecedented third term, defeating Kent Fizzell; Republican Reynolds Schultz was elected lieutenant governor; Elwill Shanahan was re-elected as Secretary of State; William Fletcher was re-elected as insurance commissioner; and Walter Peery was re-elected as treasurer
- Kansas Senate: There were no State Senate elections
- Kansas House:The Republicans won 84 seats, a loss of three. Calvin Strowig was elected Speaker
- State Party: In August 1970, the State Committee elected William Falstad as chair. Huck Boyd was re-elected as National Committeeman

===== 1972 election cycle =====
- President: Republican candidate Richard Nixon carried Kansas and won the election, defeating George McGovern. The national Republican convention was held in Miami Beach, FL
- U.S. Senate: Republican James Pearson was re-elected to the U.S. Senate
- U.S. Congress: Republican incumbent Keith Sebelius won re-election in the 1st District; Democrat Bill Roy was re-elected in the 2nd District, Republican incumbent Larry Winn was re-elected in the 3rd District; Republican incumbent Garner Shriver was re-elected in the 4th District, and Republican incumbent Joe Skubitz was re-elected in the 5th District
- Kansas Statewide: Democrat Robert Docking won re-election as governor for unprecedented fourth term, defeating Morris Kay, who had prevailed in the Republican primary over former Governor John Anderson, Ray Frisbie, and Lt Governor Reynolds Schultz; Republican David C. Owen, a close associate of Bob Dole, was elected Lt Governor; Elwill Shanahan was re-elected as Secretary of State; William Fletcher was re-elected as insurance commissioner; and Tom Van Sickle was elected as treasurer
- Kansas Senate: Republicans won 27 seats, a net loss of five seats since the 1968 election. Robert Bennett was elected Senate President
- Kansas House: Republicans won 80 seats, a loss of four seats. Pete McGill was elected Speaker
- State Party: William Falstad continued as state party chair until January 1973 when the state committee elected Jack Ranson chair. The change in dates reflected the changeover from two-year to four-year terms for the governor and other statewide elections

===== Statutory party organization (1972-1992) =====
In 1972, the legislature further regulated the structure and operations of political parties. The changes added additional detailed guidance on filling precinct vacancies, requiring county committees to reorganize within two weeks of the primary, that district committees would reorganize within 90 days of the primary, that the state committee would consist of 22 delegates from each district (eliminating the old provision that each county chair was a delegate), that the executive committee would include the state officers, district chairs and vice-chairs, and the primary federal and state elected officials or their designees, and it re-designated the party council as the platform committee. This statute was amended somewhat in 1977, 1980, 1988, and 1989 adding the chairs of affiliated groups to the executive committee.

=== Modern party history: 1974 to today ===
The modern political history of Kansas begins in the early 1970s as a result of two major structural changes. First, in the late 1960s, one-man one-vote became the legal standard governing redistricting. Before this, each of Kansas' 105 counties had one state representative, regardless of population, with the remaining 20 representatives allocated to a county based on population. The House reapportioned the 20 extra legislators in 1959 and 1909. State Senate and Congressional districts had no requirement to be of roughly equivalent population and consisted of groups of entire counties. The old system heavily weighted the legislature in favor of rural areas and diluted the political power of the new population centers in Wichita, Topeka, and Johnson County. The new paradigm for legislative districts caused substantial changes to state legislative districts and the composition of the legislature, increasing the political power of cities and suburbs at the expense of the rural areas. Second, the Kansas Constitution was amended in 1972 to make the term for statewide office, such as governor, starting with the 1974 election, four years instead of two years. Additionally, the governor and lieutenant governor would henceforth run as a single ticket, not as separate campaigns.

==== Post-Watergate decline (1974–1978) ====
===== 1974 election cycle =====
- U.S. Senate: Bob Dole experienced a close race from challenger Democrat and two-term Congressman Bill Roy. Senator Dole, for the first time in Kansas politics, made abortion a central campaign issue, using it to win over Wichita. Bill Roy campaigned intensely around Kansas City linking Dole to Nixon, Watergate, and Ford's pardon of Nixon
- U.S. Congress: Republican incumbent Keith Sebelius won re-election in the 1st District; Democratic incumbent Martha Keys was elected in the 2nd District, beating John C. Petersen; incumbent Larry Winn won re-election in the 3rd District; Republican incumbent Garner Shriver was re-elected in the 4th District, and incumbent Joe Skubitz was re-elected in the 5th District
- Kansas Statewide: The 1974 statewide office elections were the first for the new four-year terms. Republican Bob Bennett won the governorship, after winning a close 3-way primary he defeated Democrat and former attorney general, Vern Miller. Republican Shelby Smith was elected lieutenant governor; Elwill Shanahan was re-elected as Secretary of State; and William Fletcher was re-elected as insurance commissioner
- Kansas Senate: No election. After Robert Bennett resigned from the Senate to become governor, Richard Rodgers served as Senate President for the 1975 session, then was confirmed as a U.S. District Court Judge, and Ross Doyen became Senate President for the 1976 session
- Kansas House: Republicans won 72 seats, a net loss of eight seats. Pete McGill was re-elected Speaker
- State Party: In 1975, the State Committee elected Jack Ranson as chair. Huck Boyd was re-elected as national committeeman

===== 1976 election cycle =====
The 1976 was one of the worst election cycles for Kansas Republicans since the depression due to the fallout from Watergate and a general anti-incumbent mood with the voters. The Republicans lost control of the Kansas House and a Congressional seat.

- President: Republican candidate Gerald Ford carried Kansas, but lost nationally to Democrat Jimmy Carter. The Republican vice-presidential candidate was Kansas Senator Bob Dole. The national Republican convention was held in Kansas City, MO
- U.S. Senate: There was no U.S. Senate Election
- U.S. Congress: Republican incumbent Keith Sebelius was re-elected in the 1st District; incumbent Larry Winn won re-election in the 3rd District; and incumbent Joe Skubitz was re-elected for the eighth time in the 5th District. Democratic incumbent Martha Keys was re-elected in the 2nd District, beating Ross Freeman. Democrat Dan Glickman defeated eight-term incumbent Republican Garner Shriver in the 4th District
- Kansas Senate: Republicans won 21 seats, a net loss of six seats since the 1972 election. The Senate elected Ross Doyen as Senate President and Norman Gaar as Majority Leader
- Kansas House: Republicans lost the majority in the House to the Democrats for only the second time in Kansas history, winning only 60 seats, a net loss of 12
- State Party: In January 1977, the State Committee re-elected Jack Ranson as chair. Huck Boyd was re-elected as National Committeeman

==== Major reduction in party patronage (1975–1980s) ====
A profound change for party power and influence in Kansas was the substantial reduction in the extent of political patronage, that is, the practice of elected officials filling government positions with political allies of his or her own choosing. From the party's perspective, the reduction in party patronage, materially reduced the power and influence of the county chair position, which, in-turn, weakened the entire party organization.

In Kansas, since the 1860s, newly elected officials had always had broad discretion in the hiring of state and local employees and used this power to reward political allies. Elected officials would work with and on the recommendation of local county party chairs. The patronage system not only rewarded political supporters for past support, it also encouraged future support, because persons who have a patronage job try to retain it by campaigning for the party at the next election. Patronage maintained strong political organizations by offering campaign workers rewards. More importantly, patronage put people into government who agreed with the political agenda of the victor. Cooperation, loyalty, and trust flowed from this arrangement. The issue surrounding patronage was not whether elected officials should have the discretion to hire certain government employees, but how far down the organizational chain that power should extend. Too far down the chain could result in inefficiency and too little created a class of state bureaucrats unresponsive to the officials elected by the people.

Over time, Kansas civil service reforms had reduced the extent of patronage, up to the early 1970s it was still common, politically astute, and a generally accepted practice. The substantial reduction in patronage from the mid-1970s to the early 1980s was a result of post-Watergate reforms. Governor Bennett remarked that "[In 1974] we campaigned on the promise that we were going to operate the government on a very efficient and economical basis - that we were not going to rely on patronage. So that sort of foreclosed the party from a very active role in appointments. They had a passive role. Sometimes they tried to play it and sometimes they didn't even do that." Democratic Governor Carlin (1979–86) had similar observations on the change "county chairs across the state were very, very unhappy . . . They didn't follow issues, they followed patronage. They followed what they had run on to become county chair. And, you know, people were asking, what's going on here?".

==== Bob Dole and the Republican establishment (1978–1992) ====
The next 14 years lacked continual or substantial Republican control. After Bob Bennett failed to win re-election as governor, Democrat John Carlin held it for two terms (1979–1986), Republican Mike Hayden then held it for one term (1987–1990), but failed to be re-elected, Democrat Joan Finney held the governorship for one term (1991–1994) and did not run again, then Republican Bill Graves held it for two terms (1995–2002). The Democrats always held one or two Congressional seats. The Republicans lost the House majority in the 1990 election and their numbers in the House ranging from 62 to 76 of the 125 seats. The Republican majority in the Senate ranged from 22 to 24 of the 40 seats.

During this period, U.S. Senator Bob Dole was the most influential leader of the Kansas Republican Party. He effectively ensured that his supporters and former staff were in influential positions throughout Kansas.

===== Party campaign operations (1974–1990) =====
Two developments merged in the mid-1970s to redirect the state party's campaign focus and techniques. First, before 1974 the state party had been a temporary organization focused primarily on electing governors. Once the governor's term was extended to four years, the party was able to spread its focus to supporting other races. Second, as part of the post-Watergate reforms, the Republican National Committee funded efforts to professionalize state party operations and to develop statewide voter, volunteer, and contributor lists. By the late 1970s, the party was actively helping state legislative, congressional, and other statewide races by swapping volunteer and contributor lists. The state party also had the resources to conduct direct mail fund raising. By the early 1980s, the state party was able to provide some financial support to candidates. By 1990, for the first time, the party ran training seminars for vulnerable incumbent candidates, trained all candidates on campaign finance laws, and conducted some polling. The party also started doing telemarketing fund raising.

===== 1978 election cycle =====
- U.S. Senate: After incumbent Republican Senator James Pearson retired, Nancy Kassebaum was elected to the U.S. Senate after defeating Democrat Bill Roy and winning an eight-way primary that included future Congresswoman Jan Meyers. Kassebaum was the first woman to win a Senate seat in her own right (not as a widow of a senator)
- U.S. Congress: Keith Sebelius was re-elected to the 1st District; James Jeffries was elected to the 2nd District after the Democratic incumbent did not run; Larry Winn was re-elected to the 3rd district and Bob Whittaker was re-elected to the 5th district. Democrat Dan Glickman was re-elected to the 4th District
- Kansas Statewide: Democrat John W. Carlin was elected governor after defeating incumbent Republican Bob Bennett; Democrat Paul Dugan was elected Lt Governor; Bob Stephan was elected Attorney General; Jack Brier was elected Secretary of State; Fletcher Bell was re-elected as insurance commissioner; and Democrat Joan Finney was re-elected as treasurer
- Kansas House: Republicans won 69 seats, a net gain of nine seats, and recovered the majority in the Kansas House. The House elected Wendall Lady as Speaker and Robert Frey as Majority Leader
- State Party: In January 1979, the State Committee elected Morris Kay as chair

===== 1980 election cycle =====
- President: Republican presidential candidate Ronald Reagan easily won Kansas and the Presidency. Kansas held a Presidential primary, won by Ronald Reagan. The national Republican convention was held in Detroit, Michigan.
- U.S. Senate: Bob Dole was re-elected to the U.S. Senate with 64% of the vote.
- U.S. Congress: Keith Sebelius was re-elected for the sixth time to the 1st District; James Edmund Jeffries was re-elected in the 2nd District, Larry Winn was re-elected to the 3rd district and Bob Whittaker was re-elected to the 5th district. Incumbent Democrat Dan Glickman held the 4th District, defeating Clay Hunter.
- Kansas Senate: Republicans won 24 seats, a net gain of three seats. The Senate elected Ross Doyen as Senate President and Robert Talkington as Majority Leader.
- Kansas House: Republicans won 72 seats, a net gain of three seats. The House elected Wendall Lady as Speaker and Robert Frey as Majority Leader.
- State Party: In January 1981, the State Committee re-elected Morris Kay as chair. The executive director was Merlyn Brown.

===== 1982 election cycle =====
- U.S. Senate: There was no U.S. Senate race.
- U.S. Congress: Pat Roberts won the 1st District after Keith Sebelius retired; Larry Winn was re-elected to the 3rd district and Bob Whittaker was re-elected to the 5th district. Democrat Jim Slattery won the 2nd District by defeating Morris Kay after incumbent Republican James Edmund Jeffries did not run. Democrat Dan Glickman was re-elected to the 4th District, defeating Jerry Caywood
- Kansas Statewide: Democrat John W. Carlin won re-election as governor; Democrat Thomas Docking was elected Lt Governor; Bob Stephan won re-election as Attorney General; Jack Brier was re-elected as Secretary of State; Fletcher Bell was re-elected as insurance commissioner; and Democrat Joan Finney was re-elected as treasurer
- Kansas House: Republicans held steady winning 72 seats. The House elected Mike Hayden as Speaker and Joseph Hoagland as Majority Leader
- State Party: In January 1983, the State Committee elected Mary Alice Lair as chair, but she gave it up in favor of Robert Bennett. The executive director was Vern Chesbro

===== 1984 election cycle =====
- President: Republican presidential candidate Ronald Reagan swept Kansas and won the presidency. The national Republican convention was held in Dallas, TX
- U.S. Senate: Nancy Kassebaum was re-elected as U.S. Senator
- U.S. Congress: Pat Roberts held the 1st District; Jan Meyers was elected to the 3rd district, defeating Democrat John Reardon, after a five-way primary, and Bob Whittaker was re-elected to the 5th district. Incumbent Democrat Jim Slattery won the 2nd District defeating Jim Van Slyke. Incumbent Democrat Dan Glickman won the 4th District defeating William Krause
- Kansas Senate: Republicans won 24 seats, holding even. The Senate elected Robert Talkington as Senate President and Paul "Bud" Burke as Majority Leader
- Kansas House: Republicans won 76 seats, a net gain of four seats. The House elected Mike Hayden as Speaker and James Braden as Majority Leader
- State Party: In January 1985, the State Committee elected Vern Chesbro as chair. The executive director was Eric Rucker

===== 1986 election cycle =====
- U.S. Senate: Bob Dole won re-election to the U.S. Senate with 70% of the vote
- U.S. Congress: Pat Roberts held the 1st District; Jan Meyers held the 3rd district, and Bob Whittaker held the 5th district. Incumbent Democrat Jim Slattery won the 2nd District beating Phill Kline. Incumbent Democrat Dan Glickman won the 4th District beating Bob Knight
- Kansas Statewide: Mike Hayden, defeated Democrat Tom Docking, to be elected governor, after winning a 7-way primary that included Jack Breir, Larry Jones, and Gene Bicknell. Jack Walker was elected lieutenant governor. Bob Stephan was re-elected as attorney general. Bill Graves was elected Secretary of State. Fletcher Bell was re-elected Commissioner of Insurance. Democrat Joan Finney was re-elected as state treasurer
- Kansas House: Republicans won 74 seats for a net loss of two seats. The House elected James Braden as Speaker and Joe Knopp as Majority Leader. In 1987 a fiscal conservative group, the Republican Reform Caucus, formed consisting of 12 Republican lawmakers who banded together in Topeka to challenge the establishment moderate leadership. Its leaders were Kerry Patrick, Bob Vancrum, David Miller, J.C. Long, and Gayle Mollenkamp
- State Party: In January 1987, the State Committee elected Fred Logan as chair. The executive director was Catherine Whitaker

===== 1988 election cycle =====
- President: Republican candidate George H. W. Bush won Kansas and the presidency. Kansas held a presidential caucus. The national Republican convention was held in New Orleans
- U.S. Senate: There was no election for the U.S. Senate
- U.S. Congress: Pat Roberts held the 1st District; Jan Meyers held the 3rd district, and Bob Whittaker won the 5th district. Incumbent Democrat Jim Slattery won the 2nd District, defeating Phil Meinhardt. Incumbent Democrat Dan Glickman won the 4th District, defeating Lee Thompson
- Kansas Senate: The Republicans won 22 seats, for a net loss of two seats. The Senate elected Bud Burke as Senate President; Eric Yost as Senate Vice-president; Fred Kerr as Majority Leader; and Ben Vidricksen as Assistant majority Leader
- Kansas House: The Republicans won 68 seats, for a net loss of six seats. The House elected James Braden as Speaker; Dale Sprauge as Speaker Pro Tem; Bob Miller as Majority Leader, and Max Moomaw as Assistant Majority Leader
- State Party: In January 1989, the State Committee elected Rochelle Chronister as chair. The executive director was Catherine Whitaker

===== 1990 election cycle =====
- U.S. Senate: Nancy Kassebaum easily won re-election to the U.S. Senate
- U.S. Congress: Pat Roberts held the 1st District; Jan Meyers held the 3rd district, and Dick Nichols won the 5th district. Incumbent Democrat Jim Slattery won the 2nd District defeating Scott Morgan. Incumbent Democrat Dan Glickman won the 4th Congressional District, defeating Roger Grund
- Kansas Statewides: Democrat Joan Finney won the Governor's office, defeating incumbent Republican governor Mike Hayden, who had defeated Nestor Weigand in the primary. Governor Hayden was handicapped by substantial changes to the property tax system resulting from Constitutional changes made before his term began, including the first property value assessment in 20 years and the implementation of classification, i.e., assigning different tax rates based on the "class" of property as opposed to the traditional system of taxing all property at an "equal and uniform" rate". The result was substantially higher commercial property rates. Governor Hayden, therefore, suffered a similar fate as Governor Avery did in 1966 – being held accountable for the tax implications of decisions made by the previous administration. Robert Stephan was re-elected as attorney general. Bill Graves was re-elected as the Secretary of State. Ronald Todd was elected insurance commissioner. Democrat Sally Thompson won the state treasurer race
- Kansas House: For only the third time in Kansas history, the Republicans lost their majority in the Kansas House. They held 62 seats, a net loss of 7 seats, giving the Democrats a majority by one vote. The Republican Caucus elected Bob Miller as Minority Leader, and Wanda Fuller as Assistant Majority Leader
- State Party: In January 1991, the State Committee elected Kim Wells as chair; Janet Boisseau as vice-chair; Sara Ullman as secretary, and Duane Nightingale as treasurer. The executive director was Steve Brown

===== 1992 Changes to party organization =====
In 1992, the U.S. Supreme Court struck down a California statutory scheme, similar to Kansas', which regulated party structure and operations. After 1992, state parties were free to organize and operate free of government regulation, other than a bare minimum regarding election of precinct committeemen and women and filling vacancies in elected office. The major changes enacted since 1992 were to increase the state committee to 37 delegates from each Congressional district and specifying that the platform committee would be composed of two to four individuals from each district selected by the state committee chair.

==== The second conservative insurgency (1992–1998) ====
The new conservative wave was a result of two distinct political agendas that merged into one force. The first force was fiscal conservatism, which opposed what was seen as a state government grown too large, that taxed, spent, and borrowed too much. It first appeared in 1987 in the form of the "Republican Reform Caucus" a group of 12 legislators pushing for fiscal restraint. The second force, was the anti-abortion movement. In 1991, the anti-abortion movement showed its political power in Kansas during the "Summer of Mercy" when daily blockades of abortion clinics and a large rally took place in Wichita. In 1992, the conservative movement began a systematic effort to take over the party, recruiting precinct leaders with a goal of gaining control of the State Committee. In 1994, the conservative movement achieved several successes. It elected David Miller as state party chair and conservatives Todd Tiahrt and Sam Brownback to Congress. Conservative Tim Shallenburger became Speaker of the House. In 1996, David Miller was re-elected as State party chair. Sam Brownback, ignoring the requests of Bob Dole and Governor Bill Graves, ran for and won the U.S. Senate seat vacated by Dole, defeating Lt Governor Shelia Frahm, in the primary. Conservatives Jerry Moran, Vince Snowbarger and Jim Ryun were elected, and Todd Tiahrt was re-elected, to Congress. In 1998, the conservative tide ebbed and the moderate faction after conducting a well-organized and funded effort regained control of the State Committee.

===== 1992 election cycle =====
- President: Republican presidential candidate George H. W. Bush won Kansas, but lost the national election to Bill Clinton. Kansas held a presidential primary won by George H. W. Bush with Pat Buchanan second. The national convention was held in Houston, Texas. The Presidential Electors were: Shari Caywood, James Bolden, Bruce Mayfield, Carlos Mayans, Charles Rayl, and Adolph Howard
- U.S. Senate: Bob Dole easily won re-election to the U.S. Senate with 62% of the vote
- U.S. Congress: Pat Roberts and Jan Meyers held the 1st and 3rd Congressional seats. Democratic incumbent Jim Slattery won the 2nd District, defeating Jim Van Slyke. Democratic incumbent Dan Glickman won the 4th Congressional district, defeating Eric Yost. Kansas lost its fifth Congressional district to reapportionment
- Kansas Senate: Running in newly redistricted districts, the Republicans held 27 seats, a gain of five seats. The Senate elected Paul "Bud" Burke as Senate President; Jerry Moran as Senate Vice President; Sheila Frahm as Majority Leader, and Ben Vidrickisen as Assistant Majority Leader
- Kansas House: Running in newly redistricted districts, the Republicans regained the majority, with 66 seats, a net gain of four seats. The House elected Bob Miller as Speaker; Tim Shallenburger as Speaker Pro Tem; Vince Snowbarger as Majority Leader; and Robin Jennison as Assistant Majority Leader
- State Party: In January 1993, the State Committee re-elected Kim Wells as chair; Janet Boisseau as vice-chair; Sara Ullman as secretary, and Duane Nightingale as treasurer. Mike Harris was elected National Committeeman and Mary Alice Lair was re-elected National Committeewoman. The executive director was Steve Brown

===== 1994 election cycle =====
- U.S. Senate: There was no U.S. Senate race
- U.S. Congress: All four Congressional seats were won by Republicans, a net gain of two seats. Pat Roberts was re-elected in the First District and Jan Meyers was re-elected in the Third District. The Second District was won by Sam Brownback, defeating former Democratic Governor John W. Carlin, after the incumbent Democratic Congressman, Jim Slattery, ran unsuccessfully for governor. Todd Tiahrt won the Fourth District defeating 9-term incumbent Democrat Dan Glickman
- Kansas Statewides: Bill Graves won the governor's office defeating Jim Slattery. Sheila Frahm won lieutenant governor. After she resigned in 1996 to run for the U.S. Senate, she was replaced by Gary Sherrer. Carla Stovall won the Attorney General's office. Ron Thornburgh won the Secretary of State's office. The Republicans lost the treasurer race to Sally Thompson and the insurance commissioner race to Kathleen Sebelius. When Sally Thompson resigned as state treasurer in 1998, Clyde Graber (R) was appointed state treasurer
- Kansas Senate: There were no senate elections, but when Sheila Frahm resigned to become lieutenant governor, Jerry Moran became Majority Leader and Alicia Salisbury became Senate Vice President
- Kansas House: The Republicans held 81 seats, a net gain of 15 seats. The House elected Tim Shallenburger as Speaker; Susan Wagle as Speaker Pro Tem; Robin Jennison as Majority Leader, and Doug Mays as Assistant Majority Leader. This constituted a conservative leadership slate
- State Party: In January 1995, the State Committee elected David Miller as chair; Barbara Lissendem as vice-chair; Mary Jane Bradley as secretary; and Paul Rosell as treasurer. This state party election was a victory of the 'pro-life,' conservative faction. The executive director was Kris Van Meteren

===== 1996 election cycle =====
- President: Republican presidential candidate Bob Dole easily won Kansas, but lost the national election to Bill Clinton. There was no presidential caucus or primary, all delegates were directed by the state committee to vote for Bob Dole. The national Republican convention was held in San Diego, California. The Presidential Electors were: Timothy Golba, Michael Harris, Betty Hanicke, Marynell Reece, Marjorie Robards, and John Watkins
- U.S. Senate: When Bob Dole resigned his Senate seat in June 1996 to run for president and Nancy Kassebaum decided not to run for re-election as a U.S. Senator, there were open elections for both Kansas U.S. Senate seats. Pat Roberts easily won the seat previously held by Kassenbaum, defeating Democrat Sally Thompson, the state treasurer. Sam Brownback first won a primary against Sheila Frahm, who had been appointed to the seat by Governor Bill Graves. Then, in a special election, Sam Brownback defeated Jill Docking to win the seat previously held by Senator Bob Dole
- U.S. Congress: Republicans continued to hold all four Congressional seats: Jerry Moran won the 1st district after Pat Roberts vacated the seat to run for the U.S. Senate, Jim Ryun won the 2nd district, Vince Snowbarger won the 3rd district after Jan Meyers decided not to run for re-election, and Todd Tiahrt was re-elected in the 4th District
- Kansas Senate: The Republicans held even with 27 seats. The Senate elected Dick Bond as Senate President; Tim Emert as Senate Vice-president; Alicia Salisbury as Majority Leader, and Ben Vidricksen as Assistant Majority Leader
- Kansas House: The Republicans held 77 seats, a net loss of four seats. The House elected Tim Shallenburger as Speaker; Susan Wagle as Speaker Pro Tem; Robin Jennison as Majority Leader; and Doug Mays as Assistant Majority Leader
- State Party: In January 1997, the State Committee re-elected David Miller as chair; Kate Carty as vice-chair; Mary Jane Bradley as secretary; and Bill Adams as treasurer. Dwight Sutherland was elected National Committeeman and Mary Alice Lair was re-elected as National Committeewoman. David Miller resigned in 1998 to run against Gov Graves in the primary and was replaced by Steve Abrams. The executive director was Kris Van Meteren, then Karen Casto, then John Potter

==== Moderate faction regains control (1998–2006) ====
===== 1998 election cycle =====
- U.S. Senate: Sam Brownback won re-election to his U.S. Senate seat in the regular election
- U.S. Congress: Jerry Moran in the 1st District, Jim Ryun in the 2nd District, and Todd Tiahrt in the 4th District won re-election. The Republicans lost the 3rd Congressional district when incumbent Vince Snowbarger lost to Democrat Dennis Moore
- Kansas Statewides: Bill Graves, after defeating David Miller in the primary, won re-election as governor in a landslide. Gary Sherrer won lieutenant governor. Carla Stovall won re-election as attorney general. Ron Thornburgh won re-election as Secretary of State. Tim Schallenberger won the election for state treasurer. Democrat Kathleen Sebelius won the election for insurance commissioner
- Kansas House: The Republicans held 77 seats, a net loss of four seats. The House elected Robin Jennison as Speaker; Doug Mays as Speaker Pro Tem; Kent Glasscock as Majority Leader; and Shari Weber as Assistant Majority Leader
- State Party: In January 1999, the State Committee elected Mark Parkinson as chair; Margie Canfield as vice-chair; Wanda Morrison as secretary; and Steve Martens as treasurer. This election was a victory of the moderate faction. Starting in 1997 the moderate faction had recruited hundreds of precinct leaders and elected a sufficient number in August 1998 to gain control of the party's state committee. The executive director was Kari Austen

===== 2000 election cycle =====
- President: Republican presidential candidate George W. Bush easily swept Kansas. There was no presidential caucus or primary, all delegates attended the convention uncommitted. The national Republican convention was held in Philadelphia, Pennsylvania. The Presidential Electors were: Shari Caywood, Richard Eckert, Mark Heitz, Gene Eastin, Susan Estes, and Charles Hostetler
- U.S. Senate: There was no United States Senate race
- U.S. Congress: The Republicans held three Congressional seats with Jerry Moran in the 1st, Jim Ryun in the 2nd, and Todd Tiahrt in the 4th winning re-election. Phill Kline lost to incumbent Democrat Dennis Moore in the 3rd District, after beating Greg Musil in the primary
- Kansas Senate: The Republicans held 30 seats, a net gain of three seats, of whom 15 were freshman. The Senate elected David Kerr as Senate President; Sandy Praeger as Senate Vice President; Lana Oleen as Majority Leader; and Les Donovan as Assistant Majority Leader
- Kansas House: The Republicans won 79 seats, a net gain of two seats. The House elected Kent Glasscock as Speaker; Clay Aurand as Speaker Pro Tem; Sheri Webber as Majority Leader; and John Ballou as Assistant Majority Leader
- State Party: In January 2001, the State Committee re-elected Mark Parkinson as chair; Margie Canfield as vice-chair; Wanda Morrison as secretary; and Brad Stout as treasurer. Calvin James and June Cooper were elected National Committeeman and woman. The executive director remained Kari Austen

===== 2002 election cycle =====
- U.S. Senate: Pat Roberts won re-election to the U.S. Senate without opposition
- U.S. Congress: The Republicans held three Congressional seats with Jerry Moran in the 1st, Jim Ryun in the 2nd, and Todd Tiahrt in the 4th winning re-election. Adam Taff lost to incumbent Democrat Dennis Moore in the 3rd District
- Kansas Statewides: Republican Tim Shallenberger and David Lindstrom lost the race for governor against Kathleen Sebelius. Phill Kline won the attorney general's office, defeating Chris Biggs. Ron Thornburgh won re-election as Secretary of State. Sandy Praeger won election as the insurance commissioner. Lynn Jenkins won election as state treasurer
- Kansas Senate: There were no senate elections, but John Vratil became Senate Vice President after Sandy Praeger resigned to become insurance commissioner
- Kansas House: House candidates ran in new districts after redistricting. The Republicans held 80 seats, a gain of one. The House elected Doug Mays as Speaker; John Ballou as Speaker Pro Tem; Clay Aurand as Majority Leader; and Ray Merrick as Assistant Majority Leader
- State Party: In January 2003, the State Committee elected Dennis Jones chair; Pat Ranson vice-chair; Pat Smith as secretary; and Morey Sullivan as treasurer. This was the third election where the moderate faction controlled the party. The executive director was Scott Poor. In 2002, the chair tried to make the party's primary an "open" primary, allowing unaffiliated or democratic voters to vote in the Republican primary. After a lawsuit brought by Susan Estes and others, the Court ruled that unless the state committee amended its Constitution, the primary would remain closed

===== McCain–Feingold campaign finance reforms =====
In the 1980s and 1990s the state party often had a paid staff of six to ten, each with specific responsibilities. The Campaign Finance changes severely limited the amount of funds ultimately available to the state party and marked a major change in resources available to the party to use to support candidates.

===== 2004 election cycle =====
- President: Republican presidential candidate George W. Bush carried Kansas by a wide margin. There was no presidential caucus or primary, all delegates were to vote for George Bush. The national Republican convention was held in New York, New York. The Presidential electors were: Ruth Garvey Fink, Bernard "Bud" Hentzen, Dennis Jones, Wanda Konold Jack Ranson, and Patricia P. Smith
- U.S. Senate: Sam Brownback easily won re-election as U.S. Senator
- U.S. Congress: The Republicans held three Congressional seats with Jerry Moran in the 1st, Jim Ryun in the 2nd, and Todd Tiahrt in the 4th all winning re-election. Kris Kobach lost to incumbent Democrat Dennis Moore in the 3rd District after defeating Adam Taff in the primary
- Kansas Senate: Senate candidates ran in new districts established by the 2002 redistricting. The Republicans held steady with 30 seats. Steve Morris was elected Senate President; John Vratil as Senate Vice President; Derek Schmidt as Majority leader; and Karin Brownlee as Assistant Majority Leader
- Kansas House: The Republicans held 83 seats, a net gain of three seats. Doug Mays was re-elected as Speaker; Ray Merrick as Speaker Pro Tem; Clay Aurand as Majority Leader; and Joe McLeland as Assistant Majority Leader
- State Party: In January 2005, the State Committee elected Tim Shallenburger as chair; Susan Estes as vice-chair; Beverly Caley as secretary; and Emmitt Mitchell as treasurer. Steve Cloud and Alicia Salisbury were elected National Committeeman and woman. The executive director was Derreck Sontag in 2005 and then Ron Freeman in 2006

==== Republican low point and recovery (2006–2008) ====
The Republicans hit a low point in the 2006 election when Kathleen Sebelius won re-election as governor, Phill Kline lost his re-election bid as attorney general, and Jim Ryan lost his re-election bid for the Second Congressional District. Moreover, Mark Parkinson, former state party chair, became a Democrat and ran as Sebelius' lieutenant governor. This left the Republicans holding only three of the six statewide offices and only two of four Congressional seats. Intra-party factional feuding between moderates and conservatives reached new intensity, with some moderate leaders openly endorsing Democratic candidates.

In 2008, however, the Republicans regained the initiative. The Kansas Democrats, in the year of Obama, poured money and effort into Kansas, but came up short, losing the Second Congressional District to Lynn Jenkins and showing no consequential gains in state legislative races. Republican success in 2008 was due to an energetic slate of candidates and to the statewide campaign organization of U.S. Senator Pat Roberts. The Roberts organization, under campaign manager David Kensinger, invested in and developed a statewide structure to conduct an effective grassroots campaign, registering and identifying Republican voters and then effectively getting them out the vote.

===== 2006 election cycle =====
- U.S. Senate: There was no United States Senate election
- U.S. Congress: The Republicans lost one U.S. Congressional seat. Jerry Moran in the 1st District and Todd Tiahrt in the 4th District held their seats. Incumbent Jim Ryun in the 2nd District lost to Democrat Nancy Boyda. Chuck Ahner lost to incumbent Democrat Dennis Moore in the 3rd District
- Kansas Statewides: After a seven-way primary, Jim Barnett and Susan Wagle lost the gubernatorial election to incumbent Democrat Kathleen Sebelius. Phill Kline lost his re-election bid for attorney general to Democrat Paul Morrison, who later resigned in a scandal and was replaced by Steve Six. Ron Thornburgh won re-election as Secretary of State and after he resigned in 2010 was replaced by Democrat Chris Biggs. Sandy Praeger won re-election as the insurance commissioner. Lynn Jenkins won re-election as treasurer. She resigned as state treasurer after winning the 2nd Congressional District in 2008 and was replaced by Democrat Dennis McKinney
- Kansas House: After the election and some defections to the Democrats, the Republicans held 78 House seats, a net loss of 5 seats. The House elected Melvin Neufeld as Speaker; Don Dahl as Speaker Pro Tem; Ray Merrick as Majority Leader, and Jene Vickrey as Assistant Majority Leader
- State Party: In January 2007, the State Committee elected Kris Kobach as chair; Sharon Meissner as vice-chair; Beverly Caley as secretary; and David Thorne as treasurer. The conservative faction continued to control the party. The executive director for 2007–2008 was Christian Morgan

===== 2008 election cycle =====
- President: In the year Democrat Barack Obama was elected president, Republican candidate John McCain carried Kansas by a wide margin. In the Kansas Presidential Caucus, Mike Huckabee prevailed. The national Republican convention was in St Paul, Minnesota. The Presidential electors were: Tom Arpke, David Kensinger, Mike Pompeo, Jeff Colyer, Kris Kobach, and Helen Van Etten
- U.S. Senate: Pat Roberts won re-election to the Senate by a large margin defeating former Democratic Congressman Jim Slattery
- U.S. Congress: Jerry Moran, in the 1st District, and Todd Tiahrt, in the 4th District, won re-election to Congress. In a close race, Lynn Jenkins defeated incumbent Democrat Nancy Boyda to win the 2nd District, after defeating Jim Ryun in the primary. Nick Jordan lost to incumbent Democrat Dennis Moore in the 3rd District
- Kansas Senate: The Republicans gained a seat in the Kansas Senate winning 31 seats. The Senate re-elected Steve Morris as Senate President; John Vratil as Senate Vice President; Derek Schmidt as Majority Leader, and Vicki Schmidt as Assistant Majority Leader
- Kansas House: The Republicans held their ground but lost a seat to a subsequent defection, leaving them with 77 seats. The House elected, in a surprise upset, Michael O'Neal as Speaker over the previous Speaker Melvin Neufeld; Arlen Siegfreid as Speaker Pro Tem; Ray Merrick as Majority Leader; and Peggy Mast as Assistant Majority Leader

==== "Clean Sweep": Conservative faction takes control (2010–2018) ====
The 2010 and 2012 elections were watershed elections for the political history of Kansas. The 2010 election was a decisive victory for the Republican Party in the year of the "Tea Party", a grass roots, fiscally conservative movement that formed in early 2009. Led by the Brownback Campaign under campaign manager David Kensinger, the Republicans developed and implemented the "Clean Sweep" program focusing on early, detailed voter identification and a systematic data driven get-out-the-vote effort. The Republicans won all six statewide offices for the first time since the 1966 election, all four Congressional seats for the first time since the 1996 election, and gained 16 seats in the House, for 92 total seats, a number last equaled in the 1954 election. As a result, the conservative faction firmly held the executive branch and the House. In the Senate, the moderate and conservative Republican factions were of roughly equal number, allowing the Democrats, who usually aligned with the moderate faction, to control the outcome on divisive issues.

The 2012 election did not change the overall number of Republicans in the legislature, but it radically changed the composition of the Senate. After bitter primaries, the conservative Republican candidates prevailed in most races and then went on to win in the general election. Some moderate senate incumbents, who lost in the primary election, endorsed Democrats. A completely new leadership took over the Kansas Senate.

===== 2010 election cycle =====
- U.S. Senate: Jerry Moran became the new U.S. Senator, replacing Sam Brownback, after a tough primary victory over Todd Tiahrt
- U.S. Congress: Republicans won all four Congressional districts for the first time since 1996 with Tim Huelskamp winning the first, after a seven-way primary; incumbent Lynn Jenkins winning re-election in the second; Kevin Yoder winning the third, after a 13-way primary; and Mike Pompeo winning in the fourth, after a four-way primary
- Kansas Statewides: The party swept all six statewide elections for the first time since 1964. Sam Brownback became governor, Jeff Colyer lieutenant governor, Kris Kobach Secretary of State, Derek Schmidt attorney general, Sandy Praeger was re-elected as insurance commissioner, and Ron Estes state treasurer
- Kansas Senate: There were two special senate elections both won by Republicans, and Jay Emler was elected Majority Leader after Derek Schmidt resigned to become state attorney general
- Kansas House: Republicans picked up 16 seats in the Kansas House of Representatives, resulting in 92 Republican representatives, the highest number since 1953–54. Of the 92, 33 were freshman of whom 9 were elected by precinct leaders to fill post-election vacancies. The House re-elected Michael O'Neal as Speaker; Jene Vickrey as Speaker Pro Tem; Arlen Siegfreid as Majority Leader; and Peggy Mast as Assistant Majority Leader
- State Party: At the January 2009 meeting in Topeka, the State Committee elected Amanda Adkins as chair; Ron Estes as vice-chair; Susan Concannon as secretary; and Steve Fitzgerald as treasurer. Helen van Etten and Mike Pompeo were elected National Committeeman and woman. The executive director was CiCi Rojas in 2009 then Ashley McMillan in 2010

===== 2012 election cycle =====
2012 began with the state party Convention including speakers Governor Rick Perry of Texas, Governor Bobby Jindal of Louisiana, Governor Bob McDonnell of Virginia, and publisher Steve Forbes. On March 10, the state party held its presidential preference caucus at 96 locations in 90 different counties. Over 32,000 people showed up to vote. Rick Santorum won 33 delegates and Mitt Romney won seven delegates. The 2012 general election was the first time in Kansas history when three factors aligned on the same election (1) there was no U.S. Senator on the ballot, (2) there were no statewide offices on the ballot, and (3) both state Senate and House candidates ran in newly redistricted districts

- Primary Election: The primary, held on August 7, 2012, was a decisive battle between the moderate faction, particularly those in the state senate aligned with the Senate leadership, and the conservative faction, primarily challengers to Senate incumbents aligned with Governor Brownback. Of the 32 Republican senate seats, 29 had primaries. The primary election had several unique features. First, there was no U.S. Senate or statewide office race on the ballot, and, as it turned out, no Republican congressional primaries. This lack of marquee races resulted in an emphasis on legislative races. Second, when the legislature was unable to pass redistricting maps, the matter ended up before the federal court. The 3-judge panel issued new district lines for the congressional, state senate, state house, and state school board districts. The court was required to make the state legislative districts with a 1% population deviation from the perfect district and did not include incumbent locations as a criterion in its determination. The result were radically new maps, issued Friday, June 8, 2012. Candidates had to file by Monday, June 11 at noon. Consequentially, over that weekend there was a rush to recruit candidates to fill districts without an incumbent. Last, this election brought independent expenditures by Political Committees (PACs) to levels not before seen in Kansas. When the last county reported its results early on Wednesday, August 8, the conservative candidates had won a substantial majority of the Republican senate primary races
- Presidential: Mitt Romney easily won Kansas with 62% of the statewide vote. Obama only managed 37%. The National Convention was held in Tampa, Florida. The Kansas members of the Electoral College were Amanda Adkins, Todd Tiahrt, Helen Van Ettan, Randy Duncan, Kelly Arnold, and Lt Governor Jeff Colyer
- U.S. Senate: There were no U.S. Senate races. After the election, Jerry Moran was elected chair of the National Republican Senatorial Committee
- Congressional: For the first time in over 40 years, the Kansas Democrats failed to mount a serious challenge to any of the Republican candidates. As a result, Tim Huelskamp won the 1st District with no opposition, Lynn Jenkins won the 2nd District will minimal opposition, Kevin Yoder won the 3rd District with only a Libertarian as an opponent, and Mike Pompeo won the 4th District. Lynn Jenkins was elected vice chair of the Republican House Conference
- State Senate: The Republicans won a record 32 seats. Of the 11 open seats, Republicans won 10. The Republican Caucus elected Susan Wagle as Senate President, Jeff King as Senate Vice President, Terry Bruce as Majority Leader, Julia Lynn as Assistant Majority leader, and Garrett Love as Whip. This was a complete break with past leadership, none of the leaders for the 2013 Session had previously been in Senate leadership
- State House: In an unprecedented accomplishment, after gaining 16 seats in 2010 for a total of 92, the Republicans won 92 seats again in 2012, defying the general consensus that after large gains, some lost seats were normal. Of the 35 open seats, Republicans won 26. Republicans won 34 seats with no Democratic challenger. The House Republican Caucus elected Ray Merrick as Speaker, Peggy Mast as Speaker Pro Tem, Jene Vickrey as Majority Leader, David Crum as Assistant Majority Leader, and Brian Weber as Whip
- State School Board: Republicans won four of the five races
- State Party: At the January 2011 meeting in Topeka, the State Committee re-elected Amanda Adkins as party chair and elected Kelly Arnold as vice chair, Michelle Martin as secretary and T.C. Anderson as treasurer, and in a special election, Todd Tiahrt was elected National Committeeman, when Mike Pompeo resigned after winning a seat in Congress. Ashley McMillan, after serving as executive director during the 2010 election cycle, resigned in March 2011 and was replaced by Clay Barker. In February 2012, the State Committee re-elected Todd Tiahrt as national committeeman and Helen van Etten as national committeewoman

===== 2014 election cycle =====
The 2014 election saw a concentrated, but ultimately unsuccessful, effort by Democrats to win the Governor's race. Many leaders of the older moderate faction, including those who lost positions in 2010 and 2012, formed groups to support liberals like democratic governor candidate Paul Davis or independent U.S. senate candidate Greg Orman. These groups were likewise unsuccessful in bringing the Kansas electorate along with them. Bob Dole, aged 91, visited all 105 Kansas Counties in a 10-part thank you tour, campaigning for Governor Sam Brownback and U.S. Senator Pat Roberts.

- Primary Election: The primary, held on August 5, 2014, featured several major contests. U.S. Senator Pat Roberts faced a strong challenge from "Tea Party" candidate Dr. Milton Wolf, and two other candidates. Roberts prevailed with 48% of the vote. Congressman Mike Pompeo was unsuccessfully challenged by National Committeeman Todd Tiahrt. Congressman Tim Huelskamp prevailed over Alan LaPolice. There were 30 primaries for Kansas House seats, of which 15 were strongly contested. After substantial funds were expended in these races there was little or no net change in the ideological - conservative / moderate - make-up of the Republican slate of general election candidates
- U.S. Senate: Senator Pat Roberts was initially challenged by Democrat Chad Taylor and Independent Greg Orman. In a bizarre twist, Chad Taylor dropped out after winning the Democratic primary, leaving the field to Orman. After Orman gained a substantial early lead in the polls, the Roberts team launched an effective persuasion and voter turnout effort that saw numerous national republican leaders coming to Kansas. Roberts won the election with 53% of the vote to Orman's 43%
- Congressional: The four Republican incumbents swept to victory with double digit wins. As a result, Tim Huelskamp won the 1st District, Lynn Jenkins won the 2nd District, Kevin Yoder won the 3rd District, and Mike Pompeo won the 4th District
- Kansas Statewides: After a very tough and contentious race, Sam Brownback was re-elected as governor with Jeff Colyer as his lieutenant governor with 50% of the vote to 46% for Democrat Paul Davis. The other four statewide races were less contested with Kris Kobach re-elected as Secretary of State, Derek Schmidt re-elected as attorney general, Ron Estes re-elected as state treasurer, and Ken Selzer elected as the new insurance commissioner
- State House: Republicans took five democrat-held seats for a total of 97 of 125. No Republican incumbents lost and no open seats previously held by a Republican were won by Democrats. Ray Merrick was re-elected Speaker, and Gene Vickrey was re-elected House Majority Leader
- State School Board: Republicans won four of the five races
- State Party: At the January 2013 State Convention in Hutchinson, Kelly Arnold was elected chair, Michelle Martin vice-chair, Derek Kreifels secretary, and T.C. Anderson re-elected treasurer. Clay Barker remained as executive director

===== 2016 election cycle =====
The 2016 election on November 8, 2016, saw a concentrated and successful effort by the moderate faction to increase its strength in the Republican legislative offices and a successful effort by Democrats to gain seats in the legislature.

- Presidential Caucus: The Caucus was held Saturday, March 5. Turnout of 79,000 voters exceeded all forecasts. Kansas' 40 delegates were allocated with Ted Cruz: 24, Donald Trump 9; Marco Rubio 6, John Kasich 1. Kansas then selected its national convention delegates at four district and one state conventions, held in April and May 2016. The 40 delegates and 37 alternate delegates attended the National Convention in Cleveland from 18 to 21 July at which Donald Trump was nominated as the Presidential Candidate.
- Primary Election: The primary, held on August 8, 2016, saw intense competition between candidates of the conservative and moderate factions. In the Kansas Senate and House primary elections, the moderate faction gained candidates for each chamber. Congressman Tim Huelskamp was defeated by primary challenger Roger Marshall in a stiffly fought and expensive primary election
- Presidential Election: Trump won Kansas' six electoral college votes by winning 56.6% of the vote in Kansas, 671,018 votes. The electoral college met on December 19 and voted for Donald Trump and Mike Pence. The electors were: Kelly Arnold, Helen van Etten, Mark Kahrs, Ashley McMillan Hutchinson; Ron Estes, and Clay Barker
- U.S. Senate: Senator Jerry Moran won easily with 62.1% of the vote
- Congressional: The four Republican candidates swept to victory each with double digit percentage wins. As a result, Roger Marshall won the 1st District, Lynn Jenkins won the 2nd District, Kevin Yoder won the 3rd District, and Mike Pompeo won the 4th District
- Special KS-04 Election: After being confirmed as CIA Director, Congressman Mike Pompeo resigned his seat. On February 9, 2017, a special nominating convention from the 4th District selected state treasurer Ron Estes as the Republican candidate for the April 11, 2017, special election. Ron Estes went on to win the Special Election with 53% of the vote
- Kansas Statewides: No Statewide offices were up for election in 2016. In July 2017, however, Governor Brownback was nominated to be U.S. Ambassador at large for Religious Freedom. He had to be re-nominated in early 2018 and was finally confirmed in January 2018
- State Senate: Republicans lost one seat for a total of 31 of 40. The Republican Caucus, on December 5, elected Susan Wagle as Senate President and Jim Denning as Majority Leader
- State House: Republicans lost a net of 12 House seats for a total of 85 of 125. This was still their fourth best performance since 1970. The Republican Caucus, on December 5, elected Ron Ryckman, Jr, as Speaker and Don Hineman as Majority Leader
- State School Board: Republicans won four of the five races
- State Party: At the February 2015 state committee meeting held in Wichita, the State Committee elected Kelly Arnold as chair; Ashley McMillan Hutchinson as vice-chair; Derek Kreifels as secretary, and T.C. Anderson as treasurer. Clay Barker remained as executive director. At the February 2016 state committee meeting in Overland Park, the State Committee elected Mark Kahrs and re-elected Helen van Etten as National Committeeman and Committeewoman

===== 2018 election cycle =====
The 2018 election saw the Republicans lose the Governor and Third District Congressional races, the first time the Democrats had won a statewide or federal office since 2008. Republicans won the other four statewide offices, the other three congressional offices and retained the majority in the state House with a somewhat more conservative caucus.

- Primary Election: There were several open seat primaries in 2017. When Governor Brownback was confirmed as a U.S. Ambassador in January 2017, he resigned and Lt Gov Jeff Colyer became Governor on January 31, 2017. He appointed Tracey Mann as Lt Governor. The Governor primary consisted of Governor Jeff Colyer, Secretary of State Kris Kobach, Insurance Commissioner Ken Selzer, former state senator Jim Barnett and a few others. Kobach won the primary by a margin of 343 votes over Colyer. The Secretary of State primary had several candidates and Scott Schwab, the Speaker Pro Tem, prevailed. Vicki Schmidt, a state senator won the Insurance Commissioner primary. In the 2nd Congressional District, after Congresswoman Lynn Jenkins announced she would not run for re-election, a multi-candidate primary was won by Steve Watkins (politician). There were multiple House primaries in which eight incumbents were defeated and 12 open seats were contested
- U.S. Senate: No U.S. Senate seats were up for election. In January 2019, Pat Roberts announced he would not run for re-election in 2020
- Congressional: Republicans won three of the four districts. In the 1st District, incumbent Roger Marshall won with 68% of the vote. In the 2nd District, Steve Watkins (politician) won with 48% of the vote over democrat Paul Davis. In the 4th district, incumbent Ron Estes, won with 60% of the vote. In the 3rd district incumbent Kevin Yoder was defeated getting 43% of the vote
- Kansas Statewides: Republicans won four of the five statewide races, losing the Governor race. Democrat Laura Kelly defeated republican Kris Kobach for governor 48% to 43% of the vote. Independent Greg Orman, who ran for the U.S. Senate in 2014, won 7% of the vote. Incumbent Derek Schmidt was re-elected Attorney General with 59% of the voter. Scott Schwab, the House Speaker Pro Tem, was elected Secretary of State with 53% of the vote. Jake LaTurner, who had been appointed State Treasurer in 2017 was elected with 58% of the vote. Vicki Schmidt, a state senator, was elected Insurance Commissioner with 63% of the vote
- State Senate: State Senate was not up for election. The Republicans won the one special election. After the election, two republican senators switched to the Democratic party
- State House: Republican candidates won five new seats and lost five seats, leaving the House at 85 Republicans. The overall make-up of the Republican House Caucus was more conservative. After the election, two republican representatives (one had already lost in the primary) switched to the Democratic party
- State School Board: Republicans won four of the five election
- State Party: At the February 2017 State Committee meeting in Manhattan, the state committee re-elected Kelly Arnold as chair, Ashley M. Hutchinson as vice-chair, elected Alana J. Roethle as secretary, and re-elected TC Anderson as treasurer. Clay Barker stayed on as executive director until October 2017. TC Anderson resigned as treasurer in January 2018 and Richard Todd was elected replacement treasurer in February 2018. Jim Joice was appointed as executive director in April 2018 and resigned the position in December 2019.

==== Republican populism (2020–) ====
Sweeping social-economic changes altered the composition of the Republican Party. Working class voters switched to republican, not for economic reasons but for cultural ones. These new party members often opposed 1980s era conservative policies such as increased immigration, free trade, international involvement and reduced government social programs. Harbingers of this movement were Pat Buchanan's 1992 presidential campaign and Mike Huckabee's 1988 presidential campaign and culminated in the election of Donald Trump in 2016.

===== 2020 election cycle =====
The November 3, 2020, general election saw record voter turnout, record spending, and broad success for Republican conservatives in both the primary and general elections. A democrat "blue wave" did not occur, although the democrat candidates made gains in Johnson County, while losing ground elsewhere in the state. The 2020 election cycle was disrupted by the ongoing COVID-19 pandemic.

- Presidential Caucus: Due to the lack of any opposition, the four district committees and the state committee voted to bind their national convention delegates to Donald Trump and then proceeded to elect the national convention delegates. The normal national convention was canceled due to COVID-19 and a truncated convention with a few representatives from each state was substituted
- Primary Elections: In the US Senate primary, Roger Marshall prevailed over Kris Kobach and Bob Hamilton. In the KS-01 primary, Tracey Mann prevailed over Bill Clifford. In the KS-02 primary, State Treasurer Jacob LaTurner prevailed or incumbent Congressman Steve Watkins. In the KS-03 primary, Amanda Adkins prevailed over Sara Hart Weir and Andrienne Vallejo Foster. In the state senate and state house primaries conservative candidates saw broad success against incumbents and in open seat races
- Presidential Election: Donald Trump won Kansas' six electoral college votes by winning 56.2% of the vote, 771,406 votes. The electoral college met on December 14 and voted for Donald Trump and Mike Pence. The electors were: Mike Kuckelman, Helen van Etten, Mark Kahrs, Shannon Golden, Emily Wellman, and Treatha Brown-Foster
- U.S. Senate: Roger Marshall won the election with 53.2% of the vote
- Congressional: Republican candidates won three elections: Tracey Mann won the 1st District with 71% of the vote, Jacob LaTurner won the 2nd District with 55% of the vote, and Ron Estes was reelected in the 4th District with 64% of the vote. Amanda Adkins lost in the 3rd District
- Kansas Statewides: No Statewide offices were up for election in 2020, although Jacob LaTurner resigned as State Treasurer after winning a Congressional seat
- State Senate: Republicans retained 29 seats of 40 in the state senate, losing two seats and gaining two seats. The Republican Caucus, on December 7, 2020, elected Ty Masterson as Senate President and Gene Suellentrop as Majority Leader
- State House: Republicans won four new seats and lost two seats for a net gain of two seats for a total of 86 of 125. The Republican Caucus, on December 7, 2020, re-elected Ron Ryckman, Jr, as Speaker and Dan Hawkins as Majority Leader
- State School Board: Republicans won three of the five races
- State Party: At the February 2019 State Committee meeting in Topeka, the state committee elected Mike Kuckelman as chair, Virginia Crossland-Macha as vice-chair, Emily Wellman as secretary, and Bob Dool as treasurer. Shannon Golden was appointed executive director in August 2019. Virginia Crossland-Macha later resigned her position leaving a vacancy

===== 2022 election cycle =====
- Redistricting After the Kansas Supreme Court upheld the new legislative district lines all Congressional, and state senate, house and state school board races were run in new districts
- Primary Elections: In the US Senate primary, incumbent Jerry Moran prevailed with 81% of the vote. In the only Congressional district primary, Amanda Adkins prevailed in the third district with 77% of the vote. Derek Schmidt, the current attorney general, and Katie Sawyer, won the Governor - Lt Governor primary with 81% of the vote. Incumbent Scott Schwab won the Secretary of State primary with 55% of the vote. Kris Kobach won a three-way primary for Attorney General with 42% of the vote. Representative Steve Johnson won the State Treasurer primary in a very close race. Incumbent Insurance Commissioner Vicki Schmidt had an uncontested primary. Twenty-five house seats had primary elections
- U.S. Senate: Incumbent Jerry Moran was re-elected with 60% of the vote
- Congressional: Incumbent Tracy Mann was reelected in the 1st District with 68% of the vote. Incumbent Jake LaTurner was re-elected in the 2nd district with 58% of the vote. Incumbent Ron Estes was reelected in the 4th District with 64% of the vote. In the 3rd District, Amanda Adkins lost to with 43% of the vote
- Kansas Statewides: Incumbent Attorney General Derek Schmidt and Katie Sawyer lost to incumbent Governor Laura Kelly and David Toland 48% to 49%. Incumbent Secretary of State Scott Schwab was re-elected with 59% of the vote. Kris Kobach was elected Attorney General with 51% of the vote. Representative Steve Johnson won the State Treasurer race with 54% of the vote. Incumbent Insurance Commissioner Vicki Schmidt was reelected with 63% of the vote
- State Senate: State Senate were not up for election, but a special election for Senate District 38 was held for the remainder of the term of Senator Bud Estes who died in February 2021
- State House:The Republicans lost one net net and held 85 of the 125 seats
- State School Board:Republican candidates won two contested races and three uncontested races
- State Party: At the April 2021 State Committee meeting in Manhattan, the state committee re-elected Mike Kuckelman as chair, elected Sue Schlapp as vice-chair, re-elected Emily Wellman as secretary, and elected Cheryl Reynolds as treasurer. Shannon Golden remained executive director until November 11, 2022

===== 2024 election cycle =====
Source: In the November 5, 2024, general election the Republicans expanded their supermajorities in both chambers of the state legislature. In this election voter registration exceeded 2 million for the first time, saw the highest total voter turnout in state history, and had the highest advance in-person voting in state history.

- Primary Elections: In the second congressional district Derek Schmidt prevailed with 53% of the vote. In the third congressional district Prasanth Reddy prevailed with 53% of the vote. Twelve senate seats and eighteen house seats had primary elections
- Presidential: Donald Trump and JD Vance won Kansas' six electoral college votes with 57% of the vote.
- U.S. Senate: There was no election
- Congressional: Incumbent Tracey Mann was reelected in the 1st District with 69% of the vote. Derek Schmidt won the open 2nd district with 57% of the vote. Incumbent Ron Estes was reelected in the 4th District with 65% of the vote. In the 3rd District, Prasanth Reddy lost to with 43% of the vote.
- Kansas Statewides: There were no elections
- State Senate: The Republicans won 31 of the 40 seats, gaining two seats from democrats.
- State House: The Republicans won 88 of the 125 seats, gaining three seats from democrats
- State School Board: Republican candidates won two of the five seats.
- State Party: At the February 2023 State Committee meeting in Topeka, the state committee elected Mike Brown as chair, Cheryl Reynolds as vice-chair, Tess Anderson as secretary, and Alan Townsend as treasurer. Dakotah Parshall was named executive director. At the January 2024 State Committee in Overland Park, Mark Kahrs was re-elected as national committeeman and Wendy Bingesser was elected as national committeewoman.

==== 2026 election cycle ====
- U.S. Senate: Methodist pastor Adam Hamilton was elected to the US Senate, the first Democrat to be elected to this office since 1932.
- U.S. House: One Democrat, Sharice Davids, and three Republicans, Tracey Mann, Derek Schmidt, and Ron Estes were elected to the U.S. Congress.

== Prominent Kansas Republicans ==
- Sam Brownback (U.S. House (1995–1996); U.S. Senate (III) (1997–2010); Governor (2011–2018))
- Arthur Capper (Governor (1915–1918); U.S. Senate (II) (1919–1948))
- Frank Carlson (U.S. House (1935–1946); Governor (1947–1950); U.S. Senate (III) (1950–1968))
- Charles Curtis (U.S. House (1893–1906); U.S. Senate (II) (1907–1912); U.S. Senate (III) (1915–1929); 31st Vice President (1929–1933))
- Bob Dole (U.S. House (1961–1968); U.S. Senate (III) (1969–1996); Chairman of the Republican National Committee (1972–1974); Vice presidential nominee (1976); Presidential nominee (1996))
- Dwight D. Eisenhower (President of the United States (1953–1961))
- Bill Graves (Secretary of State (1987–1994); Governor (1995–2002))
- John D. M. Hamilton (Speaker of the Kansas House (1927–1928); Governor primary candidate (1928); State Party Chairman (1930–1932); National Committeeman (1932–1940); Chair Republican National Committee (1936–1940))
- Clifford R. Hope (Speaker of the Kansas House (1925–1926); U.S. House (1927–1957))
- John James Ingalls (U.S. Senate (III) (1873–1891); Senate President Pro Tempore (1887–1891))
- Nancy Kassebaum (U.S. Senate (II) (1978–1997))
- Alf Landon (Governor (1933–1936); Presidential nominee (1936))
- Victor Murdock (U.S. House (1903–1914); Editor of the Wichita Eagle)
- James B. Pearson (U.S. Senate (II) (1962–1978))
- Keith George Sebelius (U.S. House (1969–1980))
- Andrew Frank Schoeppel (Governor (1943–1946), U.S. Senate (II) (1949–1962))
- Walter Stubbs (Governor (1909–1912), Speaker of the Kansas House (1907–1908), State Party Chair (1904–1906))

== Kansas Republican Party chairmen ==
The following people were chairmen for the Kansas Republican Party:
Number	Name	Term	From	Notes
69th	Danedri Herbert	March 2025 – present	Gardner	Communications Director for Attorney General Kris Kobach (January 2023 - present)
68th	Mike Brown	February 2023 – March 2025	Overland Park	Johnson County Commissioner (2017–2021), Anti-establishment activist
67th	Mike Kuckelman	February 2019 - February 2023	Olathe	Attorney, Primary delegate (2016, 2020)
66th	Kelly Arnold	January 2013 – February 2019	Wichita	Sedgwick County Clerk (2008–present)
65th	Amanda Adkins	January 2009 – January 2013	Overland Park	Candidate for Kansas' third house district in 2020 and 2022
64th	Kris Kobach	January 2007 – January 2009	Piper	Kansas Secretary of State (2011–2019), Kansas Attorney General (2023–present)
63rd	Tim Shallenburger	January 2005 – January 2007	Baxter Springs	Kansas House (1987–1998), Speaker of the House (1995–1998), Kansas State Treasurer (1998–2002), Governor Candidate (2002), Governor's Legislative Liaison (2011–2019)
62nd	Dennis Jones	January 2003 – January 2005	Lakin	Moderate, co-founder of Traditional Republicans for Common Sense
61st	Mark Parkinson	January 1999 – January 2003	Wichita	Became a Democrat in 2006 to run for Lieutenant Governor with Kathleen Sebelius; became Governor upon her resignation (2009–2010)
60th	Steve Abrams	May 1998 – January 1999	Arkansas City	State Board of Education Chair (2005–2007), State Senator from the 32nd district (2009–2017)
59th	David Miller	January 1995 – May 1998	Eudora	Leader of various pro-life movements, resigned to run for Kansas Governor in 1998
58th	Kim Wells	January 1991 – January 1995	Lawrence	Bob Dole's campaign manager for 1988
57th	Rochelle Chronister	January 1989 – January 1991	Topeka	Bill Graves's Secretary of Social and Rehabilitation Services from 1995 to 1999, spokeswoman for Traditional Republicans for Common Sense
56th	Fred Logan	January 1987 – January 1989	Prairie Village	Higher education advocate. Youngest chairman at the time of him taking office at 35
55th	Vern Chesbro	January 1985 – January 1987	Ottawa	Founder of Contel, unsuccessful candidate for state senate in 2000
54th	David C. Owen	January 1983 – January 1985	Stanley	Kansas Lieutenant Governor (1973–1974), Senator Bob Dole's successful 1974 campaign manager
53rd	Robert F. Bennett	August 1982 – January 1983	Prairie Village	Kansas Governor (1975–1979), Senate President (1975)
52nd	Mary Alice Lair	June 1982 – August 1982	Piqua	National Committeewoman (1989–1999)
51st	Morris Kay	January 1979 – June 1982	Lawrence	House Majority Leader (1971–1972)
50th	Jack Ranson	January 1973 – January 1979	Wichita	National Committeeman (1987–1996)
49th	William Falstad	August 1970 – January 1973	Fredonia	-
48th	Don O. Concannon	August 1968 – August 1970	Hugoton	Lost the 1972 gubernatorial primary by 530 votes, led the unsuccessful West Kansas movement in 1992
47th	George Nettles	August 1966 – August 1968	Pittsburg	-
46th	Oliver H. Hughes	August 1964 – August 1966	Emporia	-
45th	Richard D. Rogers	August 1962 – August 1964	Manhattan	Senator James B. Pearson's 1962 campaign manager, Senate President (1975), Federal District Court Judge (1975–2015)
44th	Donald P. Schnacke	January 1961 – August 1962	Topeka	-
43rd	James B. Pearson	August 1960 – January 1961	Overland Park	John Anderson's 1960 campaign manager, resigned when appointed as a U.S. Senator (1961–1979) by Governor Anderson
42nd	Samuel Mellinger	August 1958 – August 1960	Emporia	National Committeeman (1964–1966)
41st	James Pratt	August 1956 – August 1958	Topeka	-
40th	Lloyd Ruppenthal	August 1954 – August 1956	McPherson	Fred Hall's 1954 campaign manager
39th	Roy W. Cox	November 1953 – August 1954	Iola	-
38th	C. I. Moyer	August 1950 – November 1953	Severance	Edward F. Arn's 1950 campaign manager, resigned to become director of the Small Business Administration in Kansas City
37th	C. Wesley Roberts	November 1946 – August 1950	Oskaloosa	Father of U.S. Senator Pat Roberts, Governor Frank Carlson's 1948 campaign manager
36th	F. Quentin Brown	August 1946 – November 1946	Greensburg	Frank Carlson's 1946 campaign manager, died in office, aged 36
35th	A. Harry Crane	August 1942 – August 1946	Topeka	-
34th	Walter Fees	August 1938 – August 1942	Iola	Payne Ratner's 1938 and 1940 campaigns manager
33rd	Frank G. Todd	August 1936 – August 1938	Atchison	-
32nd	Will T. Beck	August 1934 – August 1936	Holton	-
31st	Frank Carlson	August 1932 – August 1934	Atchison	Alf Landon's 1932 campaign manager, U.S. Representative (1935–1946), Kansas Governor (1947–1950), U.S. Senator (1951–1968)
30th	John D. M. Hamilton	August 1930 – August 1932	Topeka	House Speaker (1927–1928), Republican candidate in the 1928 gubernatorial election, Frank Haucke's 1930 campaign manager, National Committeeman (1932–1940), chair of the Republican National Committee (1936–1940)
29th	Alf Landon	August 1928 – August 1930	Topeka	Clyde Reed's 1928 campaign manager, Kansas Governor (1933–1937), presidential candidate (1936)
28th	Seth G. Wells	August 1926 – August 1928	Erie	Kansas State Auditor (1902–1906)
27th	J.L. Stryker	August 1924 – August 1926	Topeka	-
26th	Wilbur Hawk	August 1922 – August 1924	Atchison	William Yoast Morgan's 1922 campaign manager
25th	Harvey H. Motter	August 1918 – August 1922	Wichita	Henry Justin Allen's 1918 and 1920 campaigns manager
24th	Charles Sessions	August 1916 – August 1918	-	-
23rd	Joseph C. Gafford	May 1913 – August 1916	Minneapolis	Kansas State Accountant (1905–1913)
22nd	Joseph N. Dolley	August 1908 – May 1913	Maple Hill	House Speaker (1909–1910), resigned to join the new Progressive Party
21st	Schuyler C. Crummer	August 1906 – August 1908	Belleville	-
20th	Walter Stubbs	August 1904 – August 1906	Lawrence	House Speaker (1907–1908) and Kansas Governor (1909–1913)
19th	Morton Albaugh	August 1898 – August 1904	Kingman	William Eugene Stanley's 1898 and 1900 campaigns manager, Willis J. Bailey's 1902 campaign manager, Chester Long's 1903 campaign manager, clerk of the U.S. District Court
18th	J.M. Simpson	August 1896 – August 1898	-	Second Tenure
17th	Cyrus Leland, Jr.	August 1894 – August 1896	Troy	Doniphan County Commissioner (1870–1890), Kansas Collector of Internal Revenue (1888–1892), William McKinley's western presidential campaign manager (1896), Kansas Pension Agent (1897–1900), National Committeeman (1884–1900)
16th	J. M. Simpson	July 1892 – June 1894	-	First tenure
15th	William J. Buchan	September 1890 – July 1892	Kansas City	-
14th	Henry Booth	May 1888 – September 1890	Larned	-
13th	P.I. Bonebrake	July 1884 – July 1886	-	-
12th	A.L. Redden	August 1882 – July 1884	-	-
11th	J.P. Johnson	September 1880 – August 1882	-	-
10th	Joseph Wilson	August 1876 – September 1878	Topeka	-
9th	John Guthrie	September 1872 – August 1876	Topeka	Topeka Postmaster, 1872 presidential elector, candidate for Kansas Governor in 1876
8th	Daniel R. Anthony	September 1870 – September 1872	Leavenworth	Brother of Susan B. Anthony
7th	Peter Percival Elder	September 1868 – September 1870	Ottawa	Kansas Lieutenant Governor (1871–1872), House Speaker as a Republican (1877) and as a Populist (1891)
6th	Frank H. Drenning	September 1866 – September 1868	Wathena	-
5th	Jacob Stotler	April 1864 – September 1866	Emporia	House Speaker (1865)
4th	Sidney Clarke	October 1863 – April 1864	Lawrence	U.S. Representative (1865–1871)
3rd	Chester Thomas	October 1862 – October 1863	Shawnee County	-
2nd	Abel C. Wilder	October 1859 – October 1862	Leavenworth	U.S. Representative (1863–1865)
1st	Samuel C. Pomeroy	May 1859 – October 1859	Atchison	U.S. Senator (1861–1873)

== Republican National Committee members ==
National Committeemen:

- Mark Kahrs (since July 2016 to present), three terms
- Todd Tiahrt (January 2011 – July 2016), one term and a quarter, also U.S. Representative (1995–2011)
- Mike Pompeo (July 2008 – January 2011), three quarters of a term, resigned upon taking office in Congress, U.S. Representative (2011–2017), also director of the Central Intelligence Agency (2017–2018) and U.S. United States Secretary of State (2018–2020)
- Steve Cloud (July 2003 – July 2008), one term and a quarter
- Calvin James (July 2000 – July 2003), three quarters of a term (died in office)
- Dwight Sutherland (September 1997 – July 2000), three quarters of a term
- Mike Harris (July 1996 – September 1997), a quarter of a term (resigned)
- Jack Ranson (January 1987 – July 1996), two terms and a quarter
- Huck Boyd (August 1966 – January 1987), four terms and a half, plus three quarters (died in office) also candidate for the governorship in 1960 and 1964
- Samuel Mellinger (April 1964 – August 1966), half a term, also state party chair (1958–1960), became National Committeeman after Harry Darby resigned
- Harry Darby (June 1940 – April 1964), five terms and three quarters, resigned, also U.S. Senator (1949–1950)
- John D. M. Hamilton (June 1932 – June 1940), two terms, also House Speaker (1927–1928), state party chair (1930–1932), chair of the Republican National Committee (1936–1940)
- David W. Mulvane (June 1920 – June 1932; second time), three terms, conservative political operative, ally of Charles Curtis
- Fred Stanley (June 1912 – June 1920), two terms, progressive
- David W. Mulvane (June 1900 – June 1912; first time), three terms, conservative political operative, ally of Charles Curtis
- Cyrus Leland, Jr. (1884–1900), four terms, also state party chair (1878–1880; 1894–1896), conservative political operative, ally of William McKinley
- John A. Martin (1872–1884; second time), three terms, also Kansas Governor (1883–1886)
- Samuel C. Pomeroy (1870–1872), half a term, also U.S. Senator (1860–1872)
- John A. Martin (1868–1870; first time), half a term, also Kansas Governor (1883–1886)
- Samuel J. Crawford (1866–1868), half a term
- James H. Lane (1864–1866), half a term (died in office), also U.S. Senator (1861–1866)
- William A. Phillips (1860–1864), one term
- Martin Conway (1856–1860), one term, also U.S. Representative (1861–1862)

National Committeewomen:

- Wendy Bingesser (July 2024 - present)
- Kim Borchers (Since Jul 2020 - July 2024 ), one term
- Helen Van Etten (August 2008 - Jul 2020), three terms
- Alicia Salisbury (August 2004 – August 2008), one term
- June Cooper (August 2000 – August 2004), one term
- Mary Alice Lair (August 1988 – August 2000), three terms, also state party chair (1982)
- Marynell Reece (August 1975 – August 1988), three terms and a quarter
- Beth Rodgers (April 1968 – August 1975), two terms and three quarters, resigned when her husband became a federal judge
- Jerenne Mellinger (August 1966 – April 1968), half a term, widow of National Committeeman Sam Mellinger
- Donna Addington (July 1964 – August 1966), half a term, resigned for personal reasons
- Florence Emma Semple (July 1952 – July 1964), three terms
- Eleanor S. Harris (June 1936 – July 1952), four terms
- Elizabeth Bittman (June 1924 – June 1936), three terms

== Film and literature ==
In their documentary How Democracy Works Now: Twelve Stories, filmmakers Shari Robertson and Michael Camerini provide a behind-the-scenes look at Kansas Republican Party politics and the party's response to the issue of immigration in the early 2000s.

- "Story Three: You Never Know" uses the 2002 Kansas Republican primaries as a case-study for the ongoing debates within the Republican party. It focuses on the 2002 trip of David Kensinger, Sam Brownback's Chief of Staff, from Capitol Hill to guide to three conservative Kansas candidates who challenge mainstream party nominees
- "Story Four: Sam in the Snow" focuses largely on (then Senator) Sam Brownback's commitment to push forward comprehensive immigration reform in 2002, and the obstacles posed by the creation of the Department of Homeland Security. The film also chronicles his choice between the Senate Judiciary Committee with a likely position as chairman of the Immigration Subcommittee and a coveted seat on the Senate Appropriations Committee. The film's title refers to Brownback

In the 2004 book What's the Matter with Kansas?, which was written in the pre-Donald Trump days when mainstream "neoconservatives" still dominated the national Republican Party, author Thomas Frank wrote about how Republicans were able to dominate Kansas politics by adopting a more populist form of conservatism.

== See also ==
State

- Kansas House of Representatives
- Kansas Senate
- List of attorneys general of Kansas
- List of commissioners of insurance of Kansas
- List of governors of Kansas
- List of secretaries of state of Kansas
- List of state treasurers of Kansas

Federal

- Kansas's congressional delegations
- List of United States representatives from Kansas
- List of United States senators from Kansas
