= Dave Owen (Kansas politician) =

American politician

54th Chairman of the Kansas Republican Party
- In office January 1983 – January 1985
- Preceded by: Robert Frederick Bennett
- Succeeded by: Vern Chesbro

38th Lieutenant Governor of Kansas
- In office January 8, 1973 – January 13, 1975
- Governor: Robert Docking
- Preceded by: Reynolds Shultz
- Succeeded by: Shelby Smith

Personal details
- Born: August 10, 1938 (age 88) Hermitage, Arkansas, U.S.
- Party: Republican
- Education: Ottawa University

David C. Owen (born August 10, 1938) is an American former politician. He was the 38th Lieutenant Governor of Kansas from 1973 to 1975. He also served as Chairman of the Kansas Republican Party from 1983 to 1985. He is an alumnus of Ottawa University. He is married to former Kansas Secretary of Commerce Laura Owen.

Party political offices
Preceded by Reynolds Shultz	Republican nominee for Lieutenant Governor of Kansas; 1972	Succeeded by Shelby Smith
Political offices
Preceded by Reynolds Shultz	Lieutenant Governor of Kansas; 1973–1975	Succeeded by Shelby Smith
Party political offices
Preceded by Robert Frederick Bennett	Chairman of the Kansas Republican Party; 1983–1985	Succeeded by Vern Chesbro
