= Kansas Democratic Party =

Kansas affiliate of the Democratic Party

- Chairperson: Jeanna Repass
- Governor: Laura Kelly
- Lieutenant Governor: David Toland
- Senate Leader: Dinah Sykes
- House Leader: Brandon Woodard
- Founded: July 27, 1855
- Headquarters: Topeka, Kansas
- Membership (2021): ▼508,808
- National affiliation: Democratic Party
- Colors: Blue
- U.S. Senate Seats: 0 / 2
- U.S. House Seats: 1 / 4
- Statewide Executive Offices: 2 / 6
- State Senate: 11 / 40
- State House: 40 / 125

Election symbol

Website
- www.kansasdems.org

The Kansas Democratic Party is the affiliate of the Democratic Party in the state of Kansas and one of two major parties in the state, alongside the Republicans. The chair of the party is Jeanna Repass.

The party currently controls the state's governorship and lieutenant governorship, as well as one seat in the state's U.S. House delegation. In the 2026 elections, the party made gains by flipping one of the state’s U.S. Senate seats and the Attorney General’s office. It is currently in the minority in both houses of the state legislature.

== Overview ==
Since its founding as a territory, Kansas politics have been largely dominated by the Kansas Republican Party and in 1857, the Kansas Democratic Party was formed in an attempt to curb this trend by writing a constitution which would make Kansas a pro-slavery state. This constitution, which was written in Lecompton, Kansas, was boycotted by many of the free-staters and seen as illegitimate. Eventually a free-state constitution was drafted in Topeka and was adopted.

The Kansas Democratic Party has not been able to send a U.S. Senator to Washington since 1939, a record currently unmatched by any state party in America, Republican or Democratic. Kansas Democrats have only controlled the Kansas Senate for four years (1913–1916) since statehood, and have only controlled the Kansas House of Representatives for six years since statehood (1913–1914, 1977–1978, and 1990–1991).

Since the state's founding, there have been 12 Democratic governors of Kansas, six of whom were elected after 1961.

The aftermath of the “Summer of Mercy,” a series of anti-abortion protests in Wichita which split Kansas Republicans into moderate and conservative factions, established the modern “three-party politics” at the state level. Kansas Democrats often capitalize on that split, forming coalitions with moderate Republicans and independents to achieve near and complete electoral and legislative success, most notably in the 2002, 2006, 2014, and 2018 gubernatorial elections.

The party suffered major defeats in the 2010 Kansas elections, losing every statewide race and 16 seats in the Kansas House. Before then, the Democrats had joined with a coalition of moderate Republicans to effectively control the state senate. However, the ousters of several moderate Republicans in the 2010 primaries left the lower chamber in the hands of conservative Republicans.

The Kansas Democratic Party helped elect 14 new Democrats to the Kansas Legislature in 2016, and, along with substantial primary victories among moderate Republicans, often achieved bipartisan, moderate majorities in the Kansas House on issues such as Medicaid expansion and taxes.

In 2018, Democrat Laura Kelly was elected governor and Sharice Davids was elected to represent 3rd congressional district, with the party making sizable gains in suburbs and major cities around the state while keeping losses to a minimum in the rural, more conservative parts of Kansas.

The 2020 presidential election saw Joe Biden perform the best for any Democratic nominee in Kansas (winning 42% of the vote) since Michael Dukakis in 1988.

Kelly was re-elected in 2022 and Davids was re-elected in 2020 and 2022, retaining their status (alongside Lieutenant Governor David Toland) as the only statewide and congressional office holders respectively.

== Washington Days ==
Since 1895, the Kansas Democratic Party has hosted the annual Washington Days convention. Consisting of one weekend of caucus meetings, dinners, and receptions, the event ends with an address from a keynote speaker. It is traditionally held in the capital city of Topeka.

The keynote speech has historically been a proving ground for future Democratic candidates for President of the United States, including William Jennings Bryan, Ted Kennedy, Gary Hart, John Edwards, Martin O’Malley, Bernie Sanders, and Pete Buttigieg.

Keynote speakers who would go on to become president include Woodrow Wilson, Harry S. Truman, Jimmy Carter, Bill Clinton, Barack Obama, and Joe Biden. Alben Barkley, Al Gore, and Joe Biden also gave keynote speeches at Washington Days before each became vice president.

== Current elected officials ==
=== Members of U.S. Senate ===
Pre-junior U.S. Senator-elect Adam Hamilton

George McGill, who served from 1930 until 1939, was the last Democrat to serve as a United States Senator from Kansas; the state has since exclusively been represented by Republicans in that body, representing the longest losing streak by either party in any of the 50 states.

=== Members of U.S. Congress ===
| District | Member | Photo |
|---|---|---|
| 3rd | Sharice Davids | |

=== Statewide offices ===
| Photo | Office | Officeholder |
|---|---|---|
| | Governor | Laura Kelly |
| | Governor-elect | Cindy Holscher |
| | Lieutenant Governor | David Toland |
| | Lieutenant Governor-elect | KC Ohaebosim |
| | Attorney General-elect | Chris Mann |

=== Legislative Leadership ===
- Senate Minority Leader: Dinah Sykes
- House Minority Leader: Vic Miller
- Assistant House Minority Leader: Valdenia Winn
- House Minority Whip: Stephanie Clayton
- House Minority Caucus Chair: Barbara Ballard
- House Minority Agenda Chair: Brandon Woodard
- House Minority Policy Chair: Rui Xu

=== Mayors ===
- Kansas City: Tyrone Garner (3)
- Topeka: Mike Padilla (5)

== State party chairs ==
- (1855) Gen. James H. Lane
- (1866) W.P. Gambell
- (1872–1874) Thomas P. Fenlon
- (1874–1883) Col. John Elmore Martin
- (1883–1886) Hon. Wm. C. Perry
- (1886–1888) Ed Carroll
- (1888–1892) John M. Galloway
- (1892–1894) W.C. Jones
- (1894–1898) John S. Richardson
- (1898–1902) J. Mack Love
- (1902–1904) Hugh P. Farrelly
- (1904–1906) Col. William F. Sapp
- (1906–1908) Col. W.H. “Bill” Ryan
- (1908–1910) Henderson S. Martin
- (1910–1912) Burt E. Brown
- (1912–1914) William P. Feder
- (1914–1916) E.E. Murphy
- (1916–1918) Hubert Lardner
- (1918–1920) E.E. Murphy
- (1920–1922) Forrest Luther
- (1922–1924) Carl John Peterson
- (1924–1928) Fred B. Robertson
- (1928–1930) John Wells
- (1930) Ruth B. Rice
- (1930–1933) Guy T. Helvering
- (1934–1936) Clyde E. Short
- (1936–1940) C.M. Fitzwilliams
- (1940–1940) Charles E. Young
- (1944–1946) Harry Castor
- (1946–1948) Delmas C. “Buzz” Hill
- (1948–1950) Leigh Warner
- (1950–1954) John I. Young
- (1954–1955) Marvin A. “Mike” Harder
- (1955–1969) Frank Theis
- (1960–1962) John D. Montgomery
- (1962–1964) Jack Glaves
- (1964–1965) Maurice Martin
- (1965–1966) Thomas J. Corcoran
- (1966–1974) Norbert Dreiling
- (1974–1975) Robert L. Brock
- (1975–1976) Henry “Hank” Lueck
- (1976–1977) Jan Myers
- (1977–1979) Terry Scanlon
- (1979–1981) Larry Bengston
- (1981–1983) Robert E. Tilton
- (1983–1985) Pat Lehman
- (1985–1991) James W. Parrish
- (1991–1993) John T. Bird
- (1993–1999) Dennis M. Langley
- (1999–2003) Tom Sawyer
- (2003–2011) Larry Gates
- (2011–2015) Joan Wagnon
- (2015–2015) Larry Meeker
- (2015–2017) Lee Kinch
- (2017–2019) John Gibson
- (2019–2023) Vicki Hiatt
- (2023–present) Jeanna Repass

== Prominent past party officials ==
=== Federal ===
==== Cabinet members and appointees ====
- Kathleen Sebelius, 21st US Secretary of Health and Human Services (2009–2014)
- John W. Carlin, 8th Archivist of the United States (1995–2005)
- Dan Glickman, 26th US Secretary of Agriculture (1995–2001)
- Georgia Neese Clark, 29th Treasurer of the United States (1949–1953)
- Guy T. Helvering, 26th US Commissioner of Internal Revenue (1933–1943)

==== U.S. senators ====
- George McGill of Wichita (1930–39)
- William H. Thompson of Garden City (1913–1919)
- John Martin of Topeka (1893–1895)

==== U.S. representatives ====
- Dennis Moore, 3rd district (1999–2011)
- Nancy Boyda, 2nd district (2007–09)
- Jim Slattery, 2nd district (1983–95)
- Dan Glickman, 4th district (1977–95)
- Martha Elizabeth Keys, 2nd district (1975–78)
- William R. Roy, 2nd district (1971–75)
- James Floyd Breeding, 5th district (1957–63)
- George Newell, 2nd district (1959–61)
- Denver D. Hargis, 3rd district (1959–61)
- Howard S. Miller, 1st district (1953–55)
- John Mills Houston, 5th district (1933–43)
- Edward W. Patterson, 3rd district (1935–39)
- Randolph Carpenter, 4th district (1933–37)
- Kathryn O'Loughlin McCarthy, 6th district (1933–1935)
- William Augustus Ayres, 8th district (1915–21, 1923–34)
- Chauncey B. Little, 2nd district (1925–27)
- Jouett Shouse, 7th district (1915–19)
- Dudley Doolittle, 4th district (1913–19)
- Guy T. Helvering, 5th district (1913–19)
- John R. Connelly, 6th district (1913–19)
- Joseph Taggart, 2nd district (1911–17)
- George Neeley, 7th district (1912–15)
- Alfred M. Jackson, 3rd district (1901–03)
- Horace L. Moore, 2nd district (1894–95)
- John R. Goodin, 2nd district (1875–77)

=== State ===
==== Governors ====
- Laura Kelly, 48th governor (2019–27)
- Mark Parkinson, 45th governor (2009–11)
- Kathleen Sebelius, 44th governor (2003–09)
- Joan Finney, 42nd governor (1991–95)
- John W. Carlin, 40th governor (1979–87)
- Robert Docking, 38th governor (1967–75)
- George Docking, 35th governor (1957–61)
- Walter A. Huxman, 27th governor (1937–39)
- Harry Hines Woodring, 25th governor (1931–33)
- Jonathan M. Davis, 22nd governor (1923–25)
- George H. Hodges, 19th governor (1913–15)
- George Washington Glick, 9th governor (1883–85)

== Election results ==
=== Federal ===
==== U.S. Senate ====
Class 2
| Year | Candidate | Votes | % | Result |
|---|---|---|---|---|
| 1984 | James R. Maher | 211,664 | 21.24% | Lost ✗ |
| 1990 | Dick Williams | 207,491 | 26.40% | Lost ✗ |
| 1996 | Sally Thompson | 362,380 | 34.44% | Lost ✗ |
| 2002 | Did not patricipate | | | |
| 2008 | Jim Slattery | 429,691 | 36.46% | Lost ✗ |
| 2014 | Did not participate after Chad Taylor withdrew | | | |
| 2020 | Barbara Bollier | 571,530 | 41.79% | Lost ✗ |
| 2026 | Adam Hamilton | 571,573 | 51.18% | Won ✓ |

Class 3
| Year | Candidate | Votes | % | Result |
|---|---|---|---|---|
| 1986 | Guy MacDonald | 246,664 | 29.95% | Lost ✗ |
| 1992 | Gloria O'Dell | 349,525 | 31.03% | Lost ✗ |
| 1992 | Jill Docking | 461,344 | 43.33% | Lost ✗ |
| 1998 | Paul Feleciano | 229,718 | 31.59% | Lost ✗ |
| 2004 | Lee Jones | 310,337 | 27.49% | Lost ✗ |
| 2010 | Lisa Johnston | 220,971 | 26.38% | Lost ✗ |
| 2016 | Patrick Wiesner | 379,740 | 32.24% | Lost ✗ |
| 2022 | Mark Holland | 372,214 | 37.04% | Lost ✗ |

==== U.S. House ====
| Election | Votes | % | Seats (KS) | ± | % |
|---|---|---|---|---|---|
| 2016 | 317,635 | 27.06 | 0 / 4 | 0 | 9.08 |
| 2018 | 447,134 | 43.89 | 1 / 4 | ▲1 | 16.83 |
| 2020 | 557,258 | 41.01 | 1 / 4 | 0 | 2.88 |
| 2022 | 425,322 | 42.46 | 1 / 4 | 0 | 1.45 |
| 2024 | 526,153 | 40.30 | 1 / 4 | 0 | 1.16 |
| 2026 | 523,002 | 47.60 | 1 / 4 | 0 | 7.30 |

=== State ===
==== Executive offices ====
Governor
| Election | Candidate | Votes | % | Result |
|---|---|---|---|---|
| 1966 | Robert Docking | 380,030 | 54.84% | Won ✓ |
| 1968 | Robert Docking | 447,269 | 51.86% | Won ✓ |
| 1970 | Robert Docking | 404,611 | 54.30% | Won ✓ |
| 1972 | Robert Docking | 571,256 | 61.99% | Won ✓ |
| 1974 | Vern Miller/Jack Steineger | 384,115 | 49% | Lost ✗ |
| 1978 | John W. Carlin/Paul Dugan | 363,835 | 49.42% | Won ✓ |
| 1982 | John W. Carlin/Thomas Docking | 405,772 | 53.16% | Won ✓ |
| 1986 | Thomas Docking/John G. Montgomery | 404,338 | 48.10% | Lost ✗ |
| 1990 | Joan Finney/Jim Francisco | 380,609 | 48.59% | Won ✓ |
| 1994 | Jim Slattery/Carol Sader | 333,589 | 35.91% | Lost ✗ |
| 1998 | Tom Sawyer/Elizabeth Baker | 168,243 | 22.65% | Lost ✗ |
| 2002 | Kathleen Sebelius/John E. Moore | 441,858 | 52.87% | Won ✓ |
| 2006 | Kathleen Sebelius/Mark Parkinson | 491,993 | 57.90% | Won ✓ |
| 2010 | Tom Holland/Kelly Kultala | 270,166 | 32.21% | Lost ✗ |
| 2014 | Paul Davis/Jill Docking | 401,100 | 46.13% | Lost ✗ |
| 2018 | Laura Kelly/Lynn Rogers | 506,509 | 40.83% | Won ✓ |
| 2022 | Laura Kelly/David Toland | 499,849 | 49.54% | Won ✓ |
| 2026 | Cindy Holscher/KC Ohaebosim | 552,076 | 50.33% | Won ✓ |

== See also ==
- Kansas Republican Party
- Political party strength in Kansas
