= 1972 United States gubernatorial elections =

- November 7, 1972

20 governorships 18 states; 2 territories
	Majority party	Minority party
Party	Democratic	Republican
Seats before	30	20
Seats after	31	19
Seat change	▲1	▼1
Seats up	10	8
Seats won	11	7
- Republican hold Republican gain Democratic hold Democratic gain

United States gubernatorial elections were held on 7 November 1972 in 18 states and two territories, concurrent with the House, Senate elections and presidential election.

Gubernatorial elections were also held in Iowa, Kansas, South Dakota, and Texas. In these states, they were the last elections on a two-year cycle, before switching to a four-year term for governors (see 1970 United States gubernatorial elections for more information).

== Election results ==
State	Incumbent	Party	First elected	Result	Candidates
Arkansas	Dale Bumpers	Democratic	1970	Incumbent re-elected.	✓ Dale Bumpers (Democratic) 75.44% Len E. Blaylock (Republican) 24.56%
Delaware	Russell W. Peterson	Republican	1968	Incumbent lost re-election. New governor elected. Democratic gain.	✓ Sherman W. Tribbitt (Democratic) 51.27% Russell W. Peterson (Republican) 47.91% Virginia M. Lyndall (American) 0.64% Harry H. Conner (Prohibition) 0.17%
Illinois	Richard B. Ogilvie	Republican	1968	Incumbent lost re-election. New governor elected. Democratic gain.	✓ Dan Walker (Democratic) 50.68% Richard B. Ogilvie (Republican) 49.02% George LaForest (Socialist Labor) 0.17% Ishmael Flory (Communist) 0.10% Write in 0.03%
Indiana	Edgar Whitcomb	Republican	1968	Incumbent term-limited. New governor elected. Republican hold.	✓ Otis Bowen (Republican) 56.77% Matthew E. Welsh (Democratic) 42.46% Berryman S. Hurley (American Independent) 0.40% Finley N. Campbell (Peace and Freedom) 0.30% John Marion Morris (Socialist Labor) 0.08%
Iowa	Robert D. Ray	Republican	1968	Incumbent re-elected.	✓ Robert D. Ray (Republican) 58.43% Paul Franzenburg (Democratic) 40.26% Robert Dilley (American Independent) 1.30%
Kansas	Robert Docking	Democratic	1966	Incumbent re-elected.	✓ Robert Docking (Democratic) 61.99% Morris Kay (Republican) 37.05% Rolland Ernest Fisher (Prohibition) 0.96%
Missouri	Warren E. Hearnes	Democratic	1964	Incumbent term-limited. New governor elected. Republican gain.	✓ Kit Bond (Republican) 55.18% Edward L. Doud (Democrat) 44.64% Paul J. Leonard (Nonpartisan) 0.19%
Montana	Forrest H. Anderson	Democratic	1968	Incumbent retired. New governor elected. Democratic hold.	✓ Thomas Lee Judge (Democratic) 54.12% Ed Smith (Republican) 45.88%
New Hampshire	Walter R. Peterson Jr.	Republican	1968	Incumbent lost renomination. New governor elected. Republican hold.	✓ Meldrim Thomson Jr. (Republican) 41.38% Roger J. Crowley (Democratic) 39.03% Malcolm McLane (Independent) 19.56% Scattering 0.03%
North Carolina	Robert W. Scott	Democratic	1968	Incumbent term-limited. New governor elected. Republican gain.	✓ James Holshouser (Republican) 51% Skipper Bowles (Democratic) 48.45% Arlis F. Pettyjohn (American) 0.55%
North Dakota	William L. Guy	Democratic-NPL	1960	Incumbent retired. New governor elected. Democratic-NPL hold.	✓ Arthur A. Link (Democratic-NPL) 51.04% Richard F. Larsen (Republican) 48.96%
Rhode Island	Frank Licht	Democratic	1968	Incumbent retired. New governor elected. Democratic hold.	✓ Philip Noel (Democratic) 52.55% Herbert F. DeSimone (Republican) 47.07% Adam J. Varone (Independent) 0.39%
South Dakota	Richard F. Kneip	Democratic	1970	Incumbent re-elected.	✓ Richard F. Kneip (Democratic) 60.03% Carveth Thompson (Republican) 39.97%
Texas	Preston Smith	Democratic	1968	Incumbent lost renomination. New governor elected. Democratic hold.	✓ Dolph Briscoe (Democratic) 47.91% Henry Grover (Republican) 44.99% Ramsey Muniz (La Raza Unida) 6.28% Debbie Leonard (Socialist Workers) 0.71% Scattering 0.11%
Utah	Cal Rampton	Democratic	1964	Incumbent re-elected.	✓ Cal Rampton (Democratic) 69.68% Nicholas L. Strike (Republican) 30.32%
Vermont	Deane C. Davis	Republican	1968	Incumbent retired. New governor elected. Democratic gain.	✓ Thomas P. Salmon (Democratic) 55.24% Luther Fred Hackett (Republican) 43.59% Bernie Sanders (Liberty Union) 1.15% Scattering 0.02%
Washington	Daniel J. Evans	Republican	1964	Incumbent re-elected.	✓ Daniel J. Evans (Republican) 50.79% Albert Rosellini (Democratic) 42.83% Vick Gould (Taxpayers) 5.90% Robin David (Socialist Workers) 0.31% Henry Killman (Socialist Labor) 0.18%
West Virginia	Arch A. Moore Jr.	Republican	1968	Incumbent re-elected.	✓ Arch A. Moore Jr. (Republican) 54.74% Jay Rockefeller (Democratic) 45.26%

== Closest races ==
States where the margin of victory was under 5%:

1. Illinois, 1.66%
2. North Dakota, 2.08%
3. New Hampshire, 2.36%
4. North Carolina, 2.55%
5. Texas, 2.92%
6. Delaware, 3.36%

States where the margin of victory was under 10%:

1. Rhode Island, 5.48%
2. Washington, 7.96%
3. Montana, 8.24%
4. West Virginia, 9.48%

== Arkansas ==
1972 Arkansas gubernatorial election
- November 7, 1972
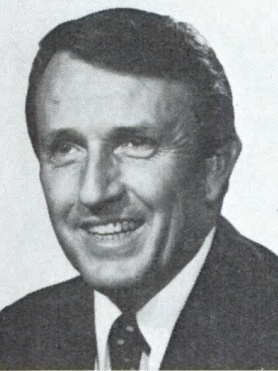

Nominee	Dale Bumpers	Len E. Blaylock
Party	Democratic	Republican
Popular vote	488,892	159,177
Percentage	75.44%	24.56%
- County results Bumpers: 50–60% 60–70% 70–80% 80–90%
Governor before election
Dale Bumpers
Democratic
Elected Governor
Dale Bumpers
Democratic

The 1972 Arkansas gubernatorial election was held on November 7, 1972. Incumbent Democratic Governor Dale Bumpers defeated Republican nominee Len E. Blaylock with 75.44% of the vote, despite Democratic nominee George McGovern losing the state in a landslide in the concurrent presidential election.

== Delaware ==
1972 Delaware gubernatorial election
- November 7, 1972
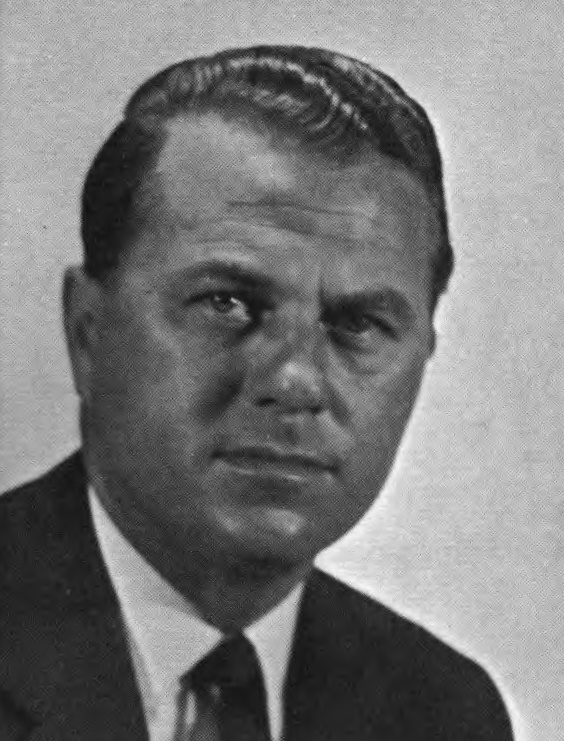

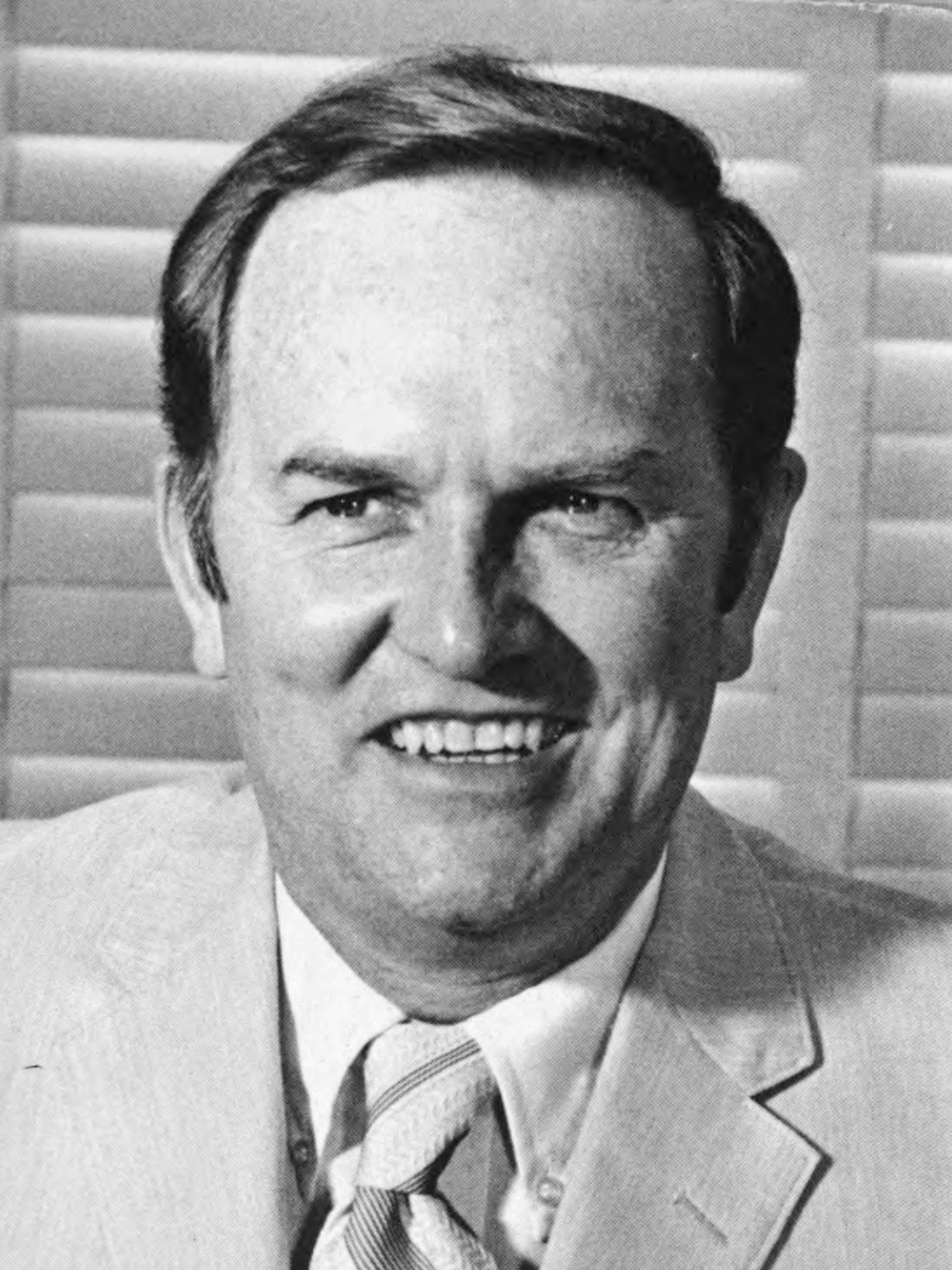
Nominee	Sherman W. Tribbitt	Russell W. Peterson
Party	Democratic	Republican
Popular vote	117,274	109,583
Percentage	51.27%	47.91%
- Tribbitt: 50–60% 60–70% 70–80% Peterson: 50–60% 60–70% 70–80%
Governor before election
Russell W. Peterson
Republican
Elected Governor
Sherman W. Tribbitt
Democratic

The 1972 Delaware gubernatorial election was held on November 7, 1972. Democratic nominee Sherman W. Tribbitt defeated incumbent Republican Governor Russell W. Peterson with 51.27% of the vote.

== Illinois ==
1972 Illinois gubernatorial election
- November 7, 1972
- Turnout: 75.28% ▼4.11 pp
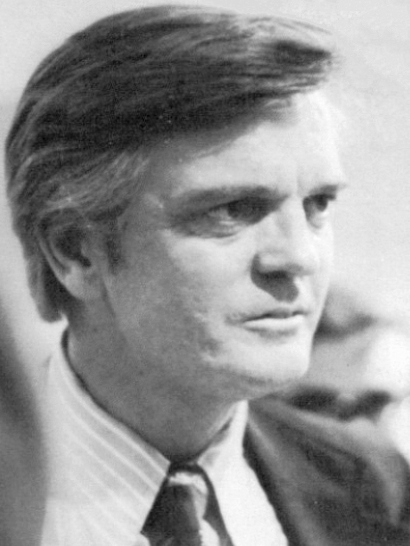

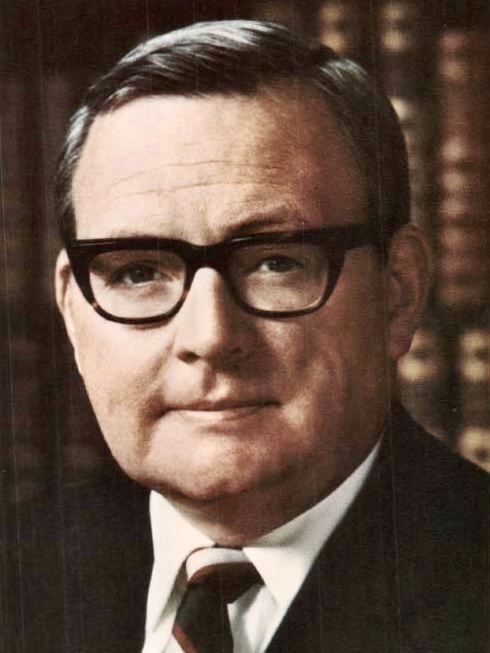
Nominee	Dan Walker	Richard B. Ogilvie
Party	Democratic	Republican
Running mate	Neil Hartigan	Jim Nowlan
Popular vote	2,371,303	2,293,809
Percentage	50.68%	49.02%
- County results Walker: 40–50% 50–60% 60–70% Ogilvie: 50–60% 60–70%
Governor before election
Richard B. Ogilvie
Republican
Elected Governor
Dan Walker
Democratic

The 1972 Illinois gubernatorial election was held in Illinois on November 7, 1972. Incumbent first-term Republican governor Richard B. Ogilvie lost reelection in an upset to the Democratic nominee, Dan Walker.

This was the first election in which each party's nominee for lieutenant governor of Illinois ran on a ticket with the gubernatorial nominee for the general election. Previously, there had been two separate elections for the two offices. This would be the last election of the 20th century in which a Democrat won the governorship of Illinois, with all seven remaining elections of that century being won by Republican nominees.

== Indiana ==
1972 Indiana gubernatorial election
- November 7, 1972
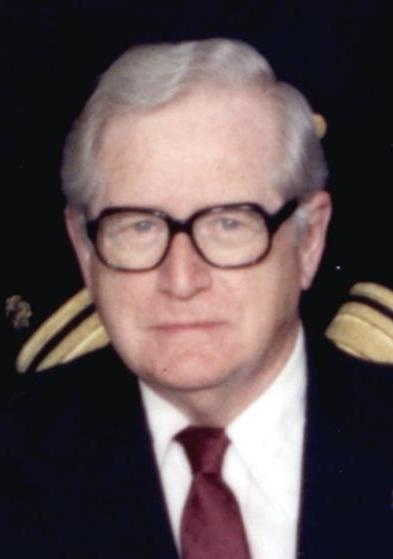

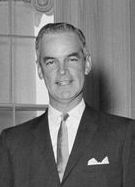
Nominee	Otis Bowen	Matthew E. Welsh
Party	Republican	Democratic
Popular vote	1,203,903	900,489
Percentage	56.77%	42.46%
- County results Bowen: 40–50% 50–60% 60–70% 70–80% Welsh: 40–50% 50–60%
Governor before election
Edgar Whitcomb
Republican
Elected Governor
Otis Bowen
Republican

The 1972 Indiana gubernatorial election was held on November 7, 1972. Although during the same election cycle Indiana voters approved a constitutional amendment allowing the governor to serve in office for eight out of 12 years, incumbent Republican Governor Edgar Whitcomb was term-limited due to having been elected under the prior version of the constitution.

Republican nominee, Speaker of the Indiana House of Representatives Otis Bowen, defeated Democratic nominee, former Governor (1961–1965) Matthew E. Welsh, with 56.77% of the vote.

== Iowa ==
1972 Iowa gubernatorial election
- November 7, 1972
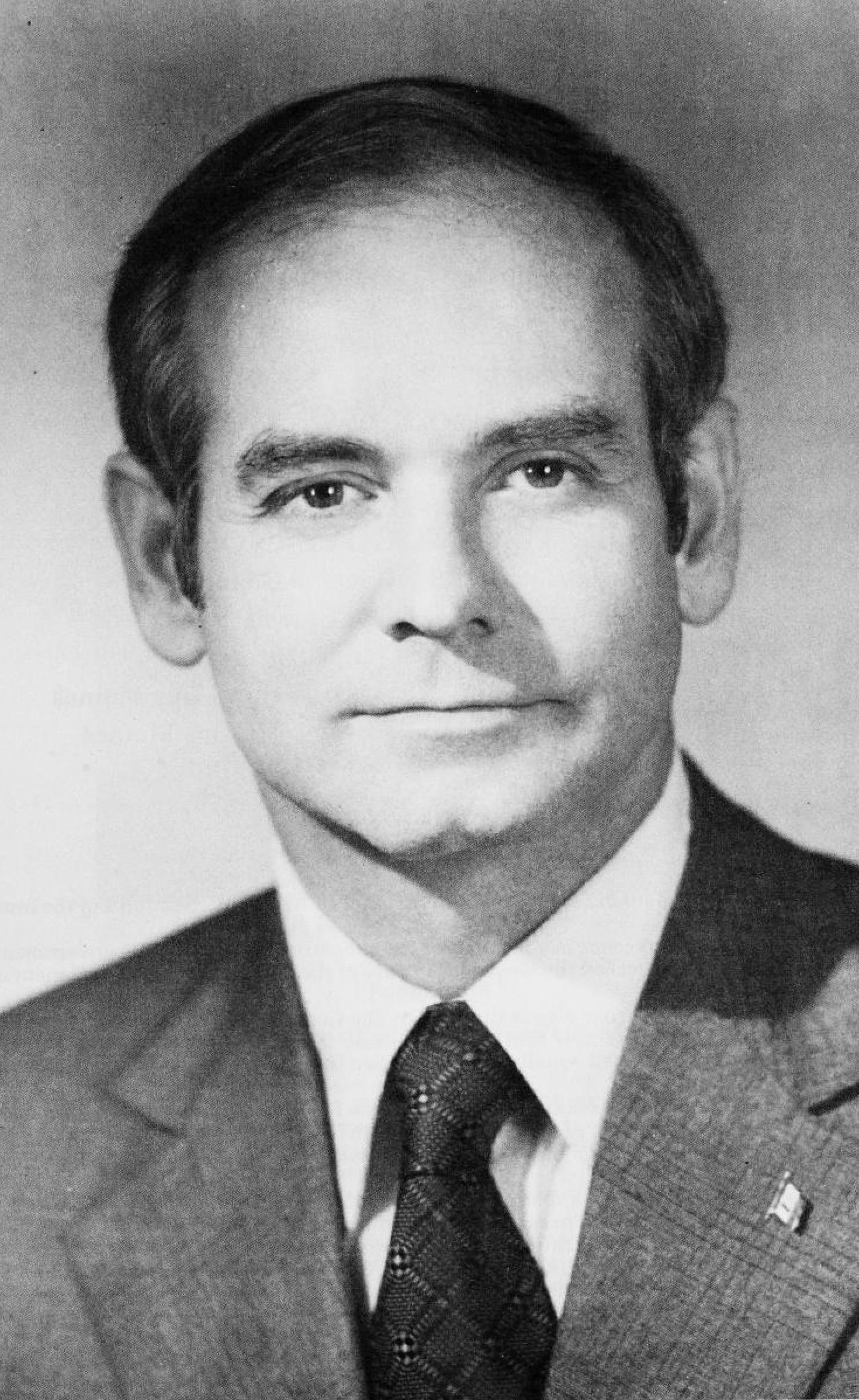

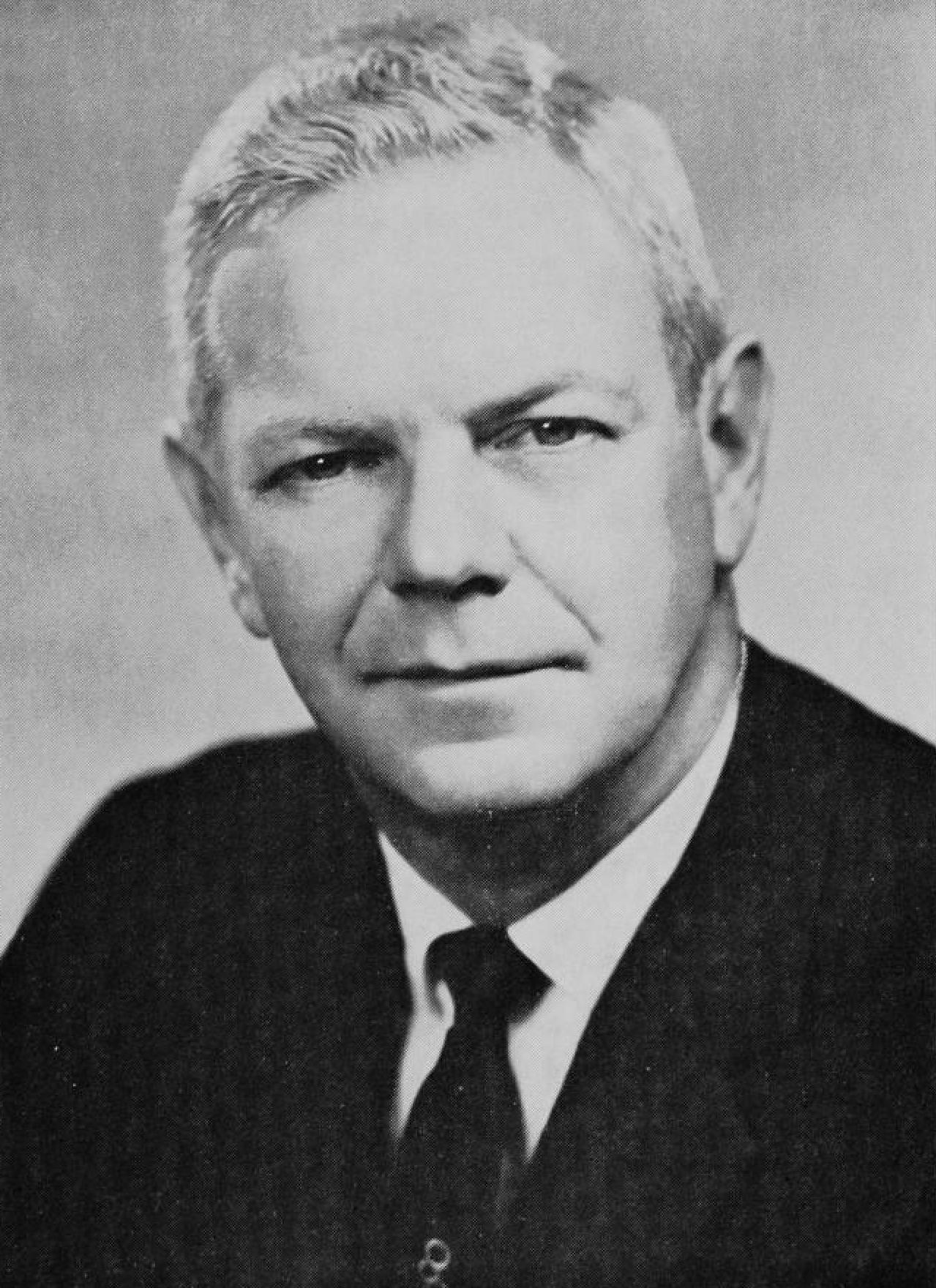
Nominee	Robert D. Ray	Paul Franzenburg
Party	Republican	Democratic
Popular vote	707,177	487,282
Percentage	58.4%	40.3%
- County results Ray: 40-50% 50-60% 60-70% 70-80%
Governor before election
Robert D. Ray
Republican
Elected Governor
Robert D. Ray
Republican

The 1972 Iowa gubernatorial election was held on November 7, 1972. Incumbent Republican Robert D. Ray defeated Democratic nominee Paul Franzenburg with 58.43% of the vote.

== Kansas ==
1972 Kansas gubernatorial election
- November 7, 1972
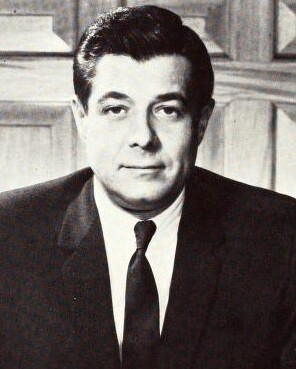

Nominee	Robert Docking	Morris Kay
Party	Democratic	Republican
Popular vote	571,256	341,440
Percentage	62.0%	37.1%
- County results Docking: 40–50% 50–60% 60–70% 70–80% Kay: 50–60%
Governor before election
Robert Docking
Democratic
Elected Governor
Robert Docking
Democratic

The 1972 Kansas gubernatorial election was held on November 7, 1972. Incumbent Democrat Robert Docking defeated Republican nominee Morris Kay with 62.0% of the vote.

== Missouri ==
1972 Missouri gubernatorial election
- November 7, 1972
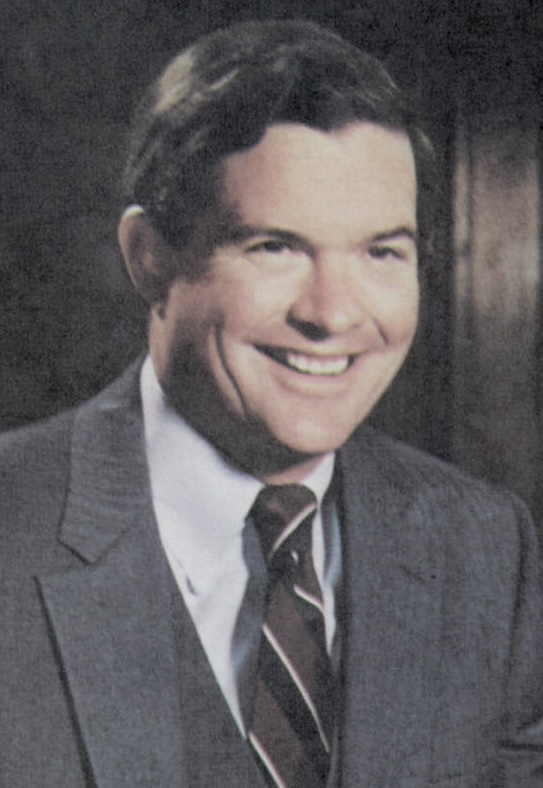

Nominee	Kit Bond	Edward L. Dowd
Party	Republican	Democratic
Popular vote	1,029,451	832,751
Percentage	55.2%	44.6%
- County results Bond: 50-60% 60-70% 70-80% Dowd: 50-60% 60-70%
Governor before election
Warren E. Hearnes
Democratic
Elected Governor
Kit Bond
Republican

The 1972 Missouri gubernatorial election was held on November 7, 1972 in the U.S state of Missouri and resulted in a victory for the Republican nominee for the first time since 1940 incumbent State Auditor of Missouri Kit Bond, over the Democratic nominee, Edward L. Dowd, and nonpartisan Paul J. Leonard. Joseph P. Teasdale was a candidate for the Democratic Party nomination, before winning the nomination in the 1976 election, as was lieutenant governor William S. Morris, while Gene McNary was a candidate for the Republican nomination.

== Montana ==
1972 Montana gubernatorial election
- November 7, 1972
- Turnout: 84.60%▼1.80

Nominee	Thomas Lee Judge	Ed Smith
Party	Democratic	Republican
Popular vote	172,523	146,231
Percentage	54.12%	45.88%
- County results Anderson: 50–60% 60–70% 70–80% Smith: 50-60% 60–70% 70–80% 80–90%
Governor before election
Forrest H. Anderson
Democratic
Elected Governor
Thomas Lee Judge
Democratic

The 1972 Montana gubernatorial election took place on November 7, 1972. Incumbent Governor of Montana Forrest H. Anderson, who was first elected in 1968, declined to seek re-election. Thomas Lee Judge, the lieutenant governor of Montana, won a competitive Democratic primary, and moved on to the general election, where he faced Ed Smith, a rancher and the Republican nominee. Although President Richard Nixon won the state in a landslide in that year's presidential election, Judge managed to handily defeat Smith, winning his first of two terms as governor.

== New Hampshire ==
1972 New Hampshire gubernatorial election
- November 7, 1972
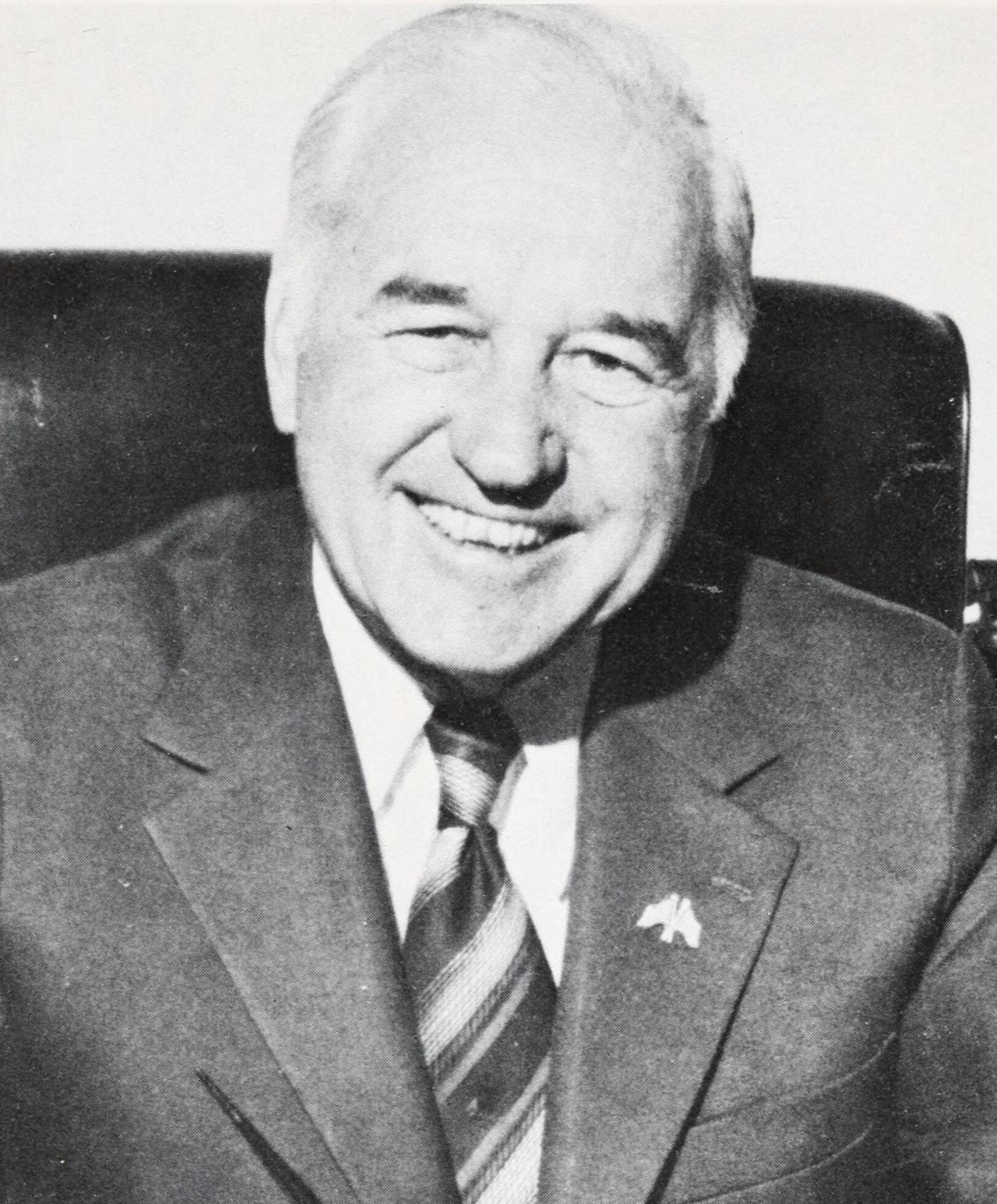

Nominee	Meldrim Thomson Jr.	Roger J. Crowley	Malcolm McLane
Party	Republican	Democratic	Independent
Popular vote	133,702	126,107	63,199
Percentage	41.38%	39.03%	19.56%
- Thomson: 30–40% 40–50% 50–60% 60–70% 70–80% 80–90% >90% Crowley: 30–40% 40–50% 50–60% 60–70% >90% McLane: 30–40% 40–50% 50–60% 60–70% 70–80% 80–90% No data/vote
Governor before election
Walter R. Peterson Jr.
Republican
Elected Governor
Meldrim Thomson Jr.
Republican

The 1972 New Hampshire gubernatorial election was held on November 7, 1972. Incumbent Republican Governor Walter R. Peterson Jr. was defeated for renomination in the Republican primary.

Republican nominee Meldrim Thomson Jr. defeated Democratic nominee Roger J. Crowley with 41.38% of the vote.

== North Carolina ==
1972 North Carolina gubernatorial election
- November 7, 1972
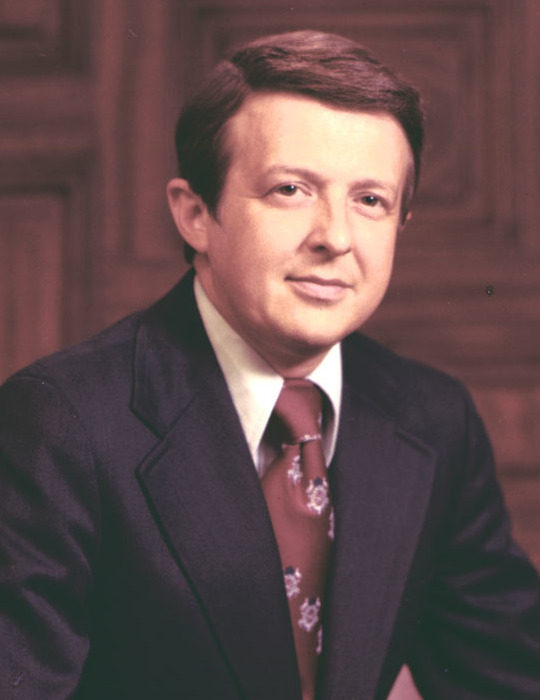

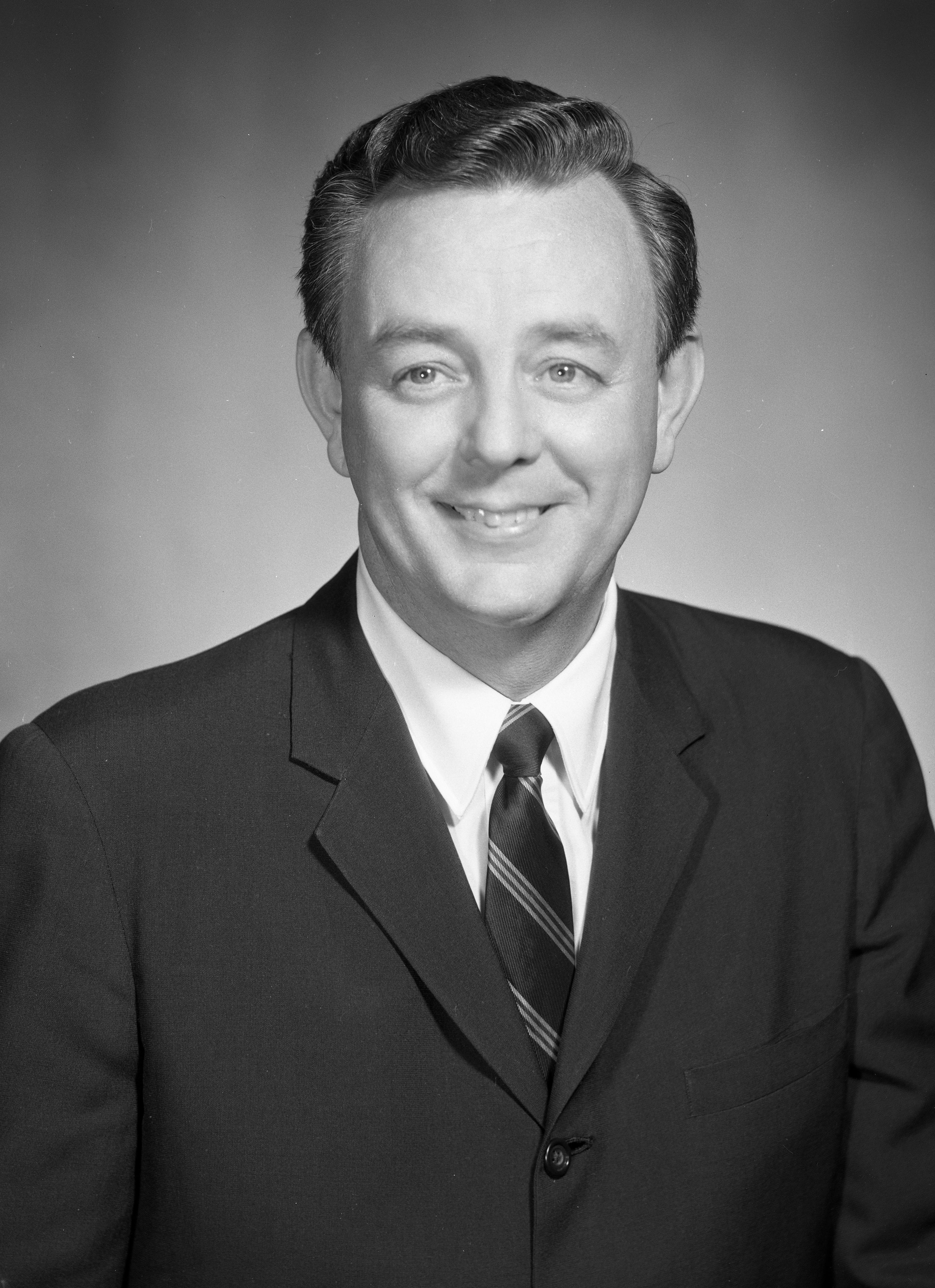
Nominee	James Holshouser	Skipper Bowles
Party	Republican	Democratic
Popular vote	767,470	729,104
Percentage	51.00%	48.45%
- County results Holshouser: 50-60% 60-70% 70-80% 80-90% Bowles: 40-50% 50–60% 60–70% 70–80% 80–90%
Governor before election
Robert W. Scott
Democratic
Elected Governor
James Holshouser
Republican

The 1972 North Carolina gubernatorial election was held on November 7, 1972. Republican nominee James Holshouser defeated Democratic nominee Skipper Bowles with 51% of the vote. Holshouser thus became the first Republican elected governor of the state since 1896.

This election was also the first time in a century (since the 1872 election) that a Republican candidate won an outright majority of the vote.

== North Dakota ==
1972 North Dakota gubernatorial election
- November 7, 1972
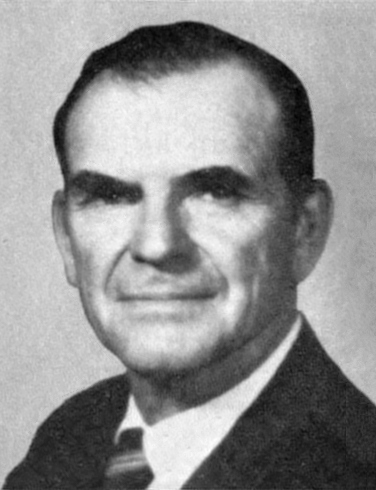

Nominee	Arthur A. Link	Richard F. Larsen
Party	Democratic–NPL	Republican
Popular vote	143,899	138,032
Percentage	51.0%	49.0%
- County results Link: 50–60% 60–70% Larsen: 50–60% 60–70%
Governor before election
William L. Guy
Democratic–NPL
Elected Governor
Arthur A. Link
Democratic–NPL

The 1972 North Dakota gubernatorial election was held on November 7, 1972. The election pitted Democratic Congressman Arthur A. Link against Republican Lieutenant Governor Richard F. Larsen. Link narrowly defeated Larsen by a margin of 51% to 49%.

== Rhode Island ==
1972 Rhode Island gubernatorial election
- November 7, 1972
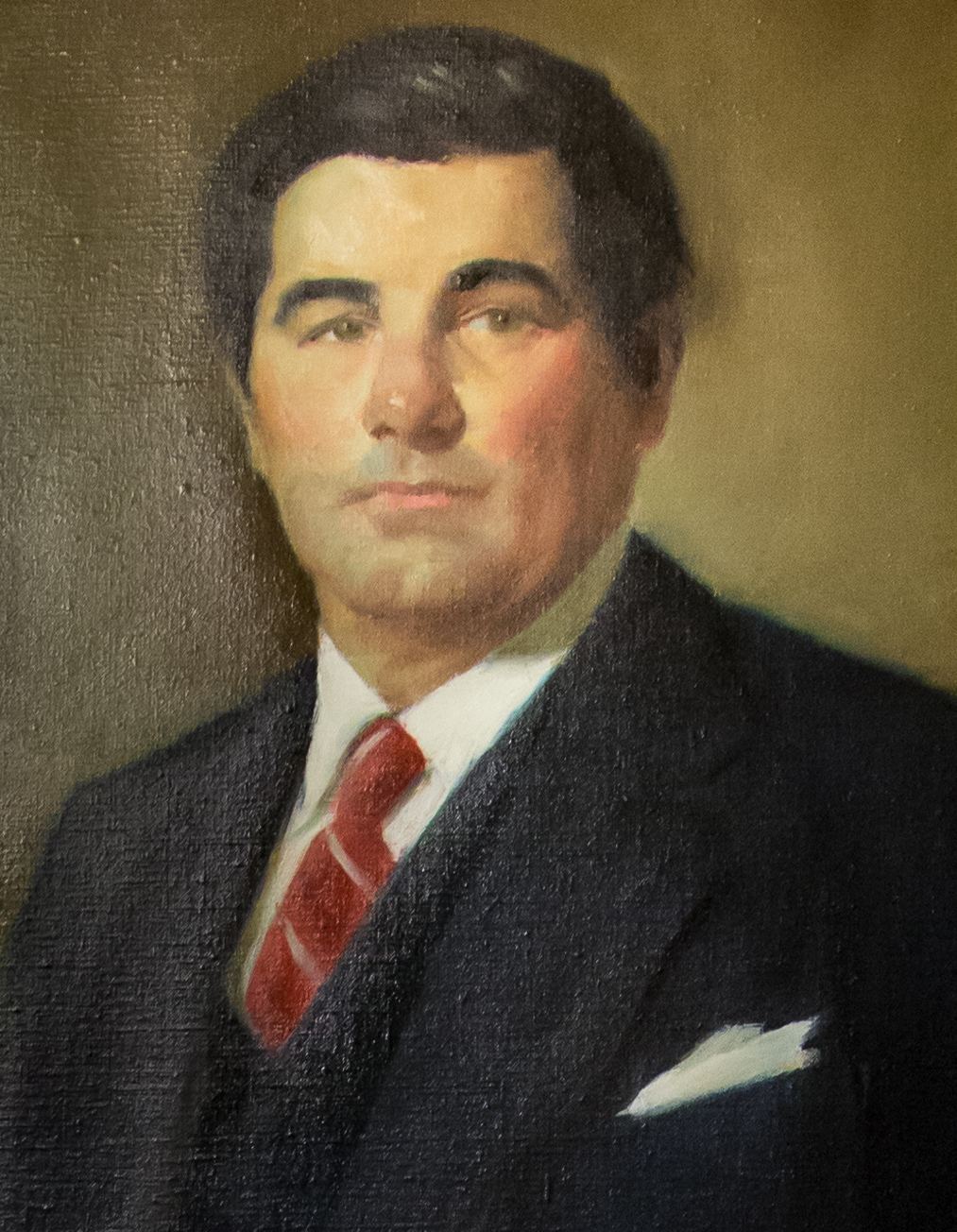

Nominee	Philip Noel	Herbert DeSimone
Party	Democratic	Republican
Popular vote	216,953	194,315
Percentage	52.55%	47.07%
- Noel: 50–60% 60–70% DeSimone: 40–50% 50–60%
Governor before election
Frank Licht
Democratic
Elected Governor
Philip Noel
Democratic

The 1972 Rhode Island gubernatorial election was held on November 7, 1972. Democratic nominee Philip Noel defeated Republican nominee Herbert F. DeSimone with 52.55% of the vote.

== South Dakota ==
1972 South Dakota gubernatorial election
- November 7, 1972
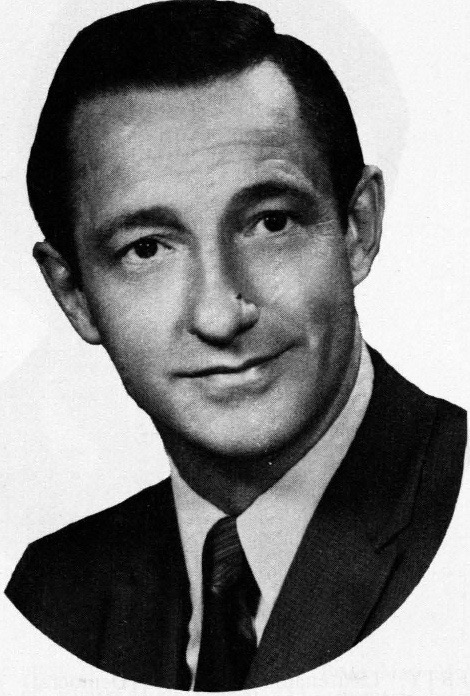

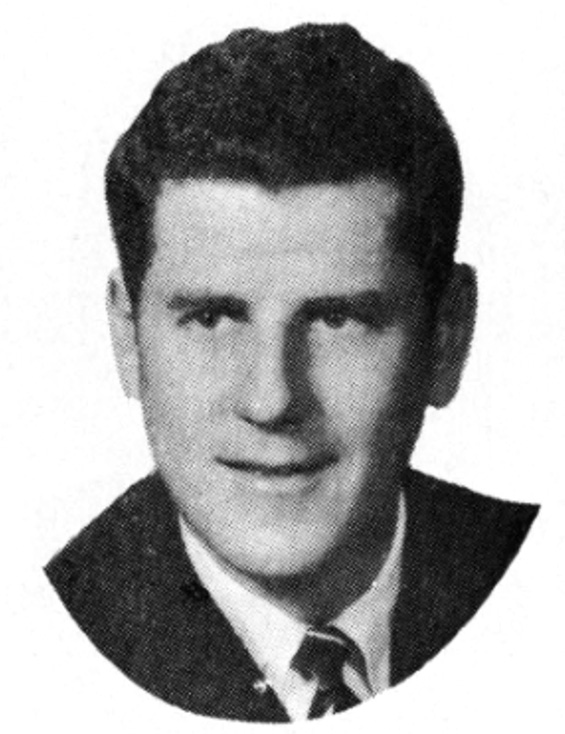
Nominee	Richard F. Kneip	Carveth Thompson
Party	Democratic	Republican
Running mate	Bill Dougherty
Popular vote	185,012	123,165
Percentage	60.0%	40.0%
- County results Kneip: 50–60% 60–70% 70–80% Thompson: 50-60% 60-70%
Governor before election
Richard F. Kneip
Democratic
Elected Governor
Richard F. Kneip
Democratic

The 1972 South Dakota gubernatorial election was held on November 7, 1972, to elect a governor of South Dakota. It was the last election in South Dakota to elect the governor for a two-year term after a 1972 state constitutional amendment established a four-year term. Democratic nominee Richard F. Kneip was re-elected, defeating Republican nominee Carveth Thompson despite incumbent Republican President Richard Nixon winning the state with 62% of the vote on the same ballot.

== Texas ==
1972 Texas gubernatorial election
- November 7, 1972
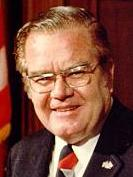

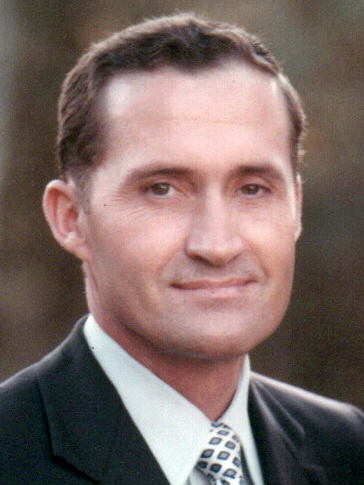

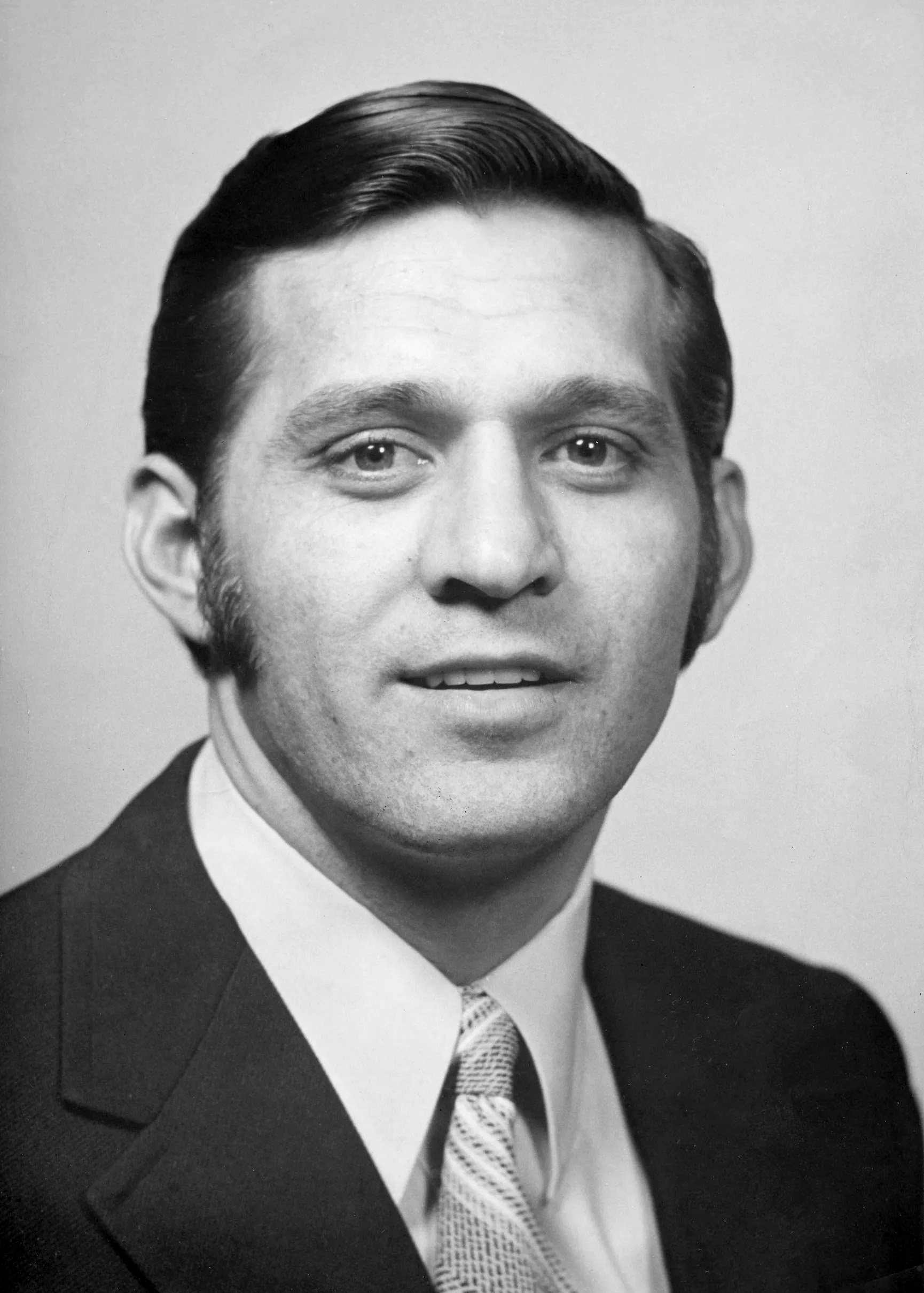
Nominee	Dolph Briscoe	Henry Grover	Ramsey Muñiz
Party	Democratic	Republican	Raza Unida
Popular vote	1,633,493	1,533,986	214,118
Percentage	47.9%	45.0%	6.3%
- County results Briscoe: 40–50% 50–60% 60–70% 70–80% 80–90% Grover: 40–50% 50–60% 60–70% Muñiz: 40–50% 50–60%
Governor before election
Preston Smith
Democratic
Elected Governor
Dolph Briscoe
Democratic

The 1972 Texas gubernatorial election was held on November 7, 1972, to elect the governor of Texas. Incumbent Democratic Governor Preston Smith ran for reelection, but lost renomination to businessman Dolph Briscoe. Smith was overwhelmingly rejected in the Democratic primary, taking fourth place with only 8% of the vote amid the fallout from the Sharpstown scandal. Briscoe went on to win the general election by a relatively small margin, winning 48% of the vote to Republican Henry Grover's 45%. Raza Unida candidate Ramsey Muniz won 6%.

== Utah ==
1972 Utah gubernatorial election
- November 7, 1972
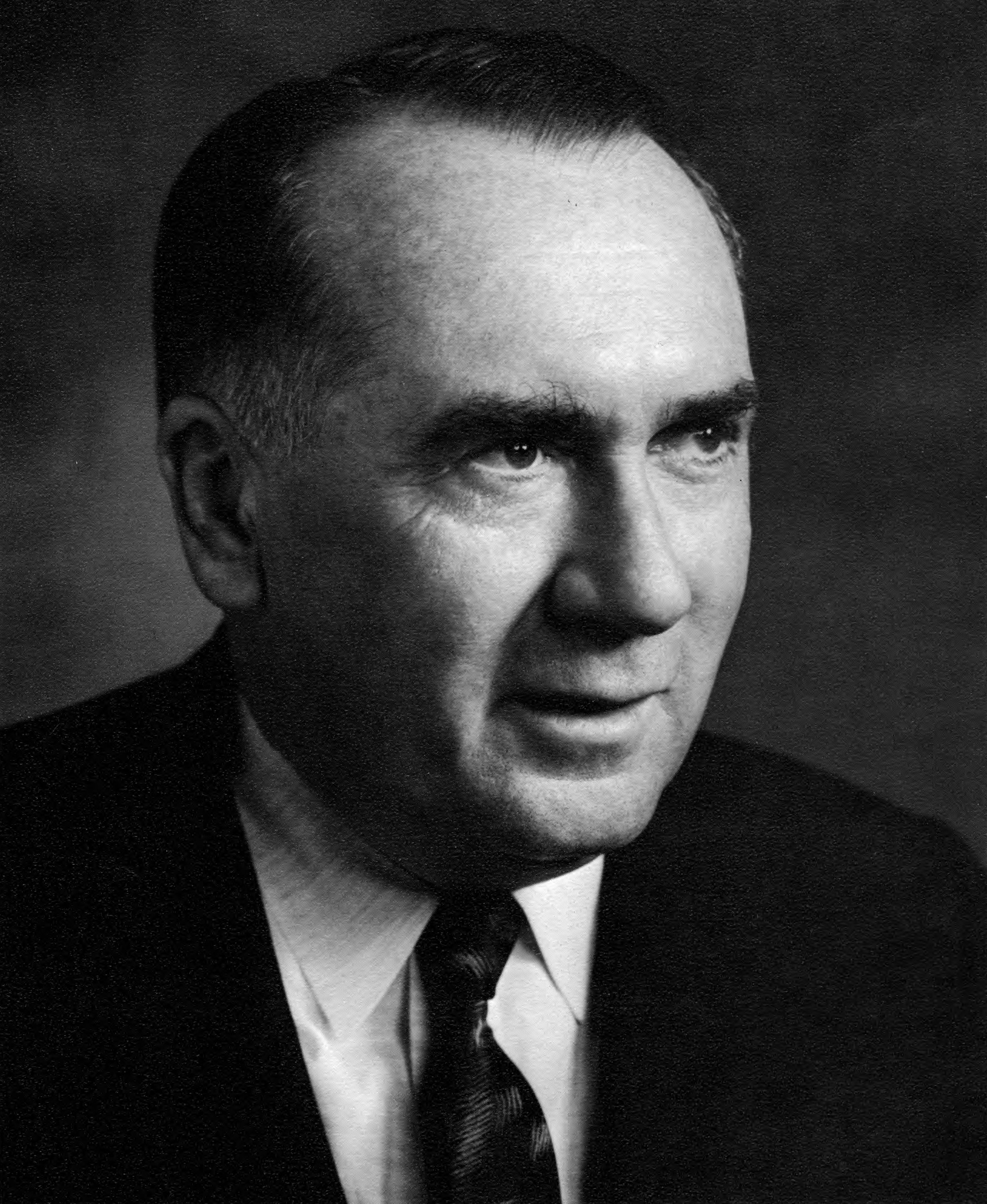

Nominee	Cal Rampton	Nicholas L. Strike
Party	Democratic	Republican
Popular vote	331,998	144,449
Percentage	69.69%	30.31%
- County results Rampton: 50–60% 60–70% 70–80% Strike: 50–60%
Governor before election
Cal Rampton
Democratic
Elected Governor
Cal Rampton
Democratic

The 1972 Utah gubernatorial election was held on November 7, 1972. Democratic incumbent Cal Rampton defeated Republican nominee Nicholas L. Strike with 69.69% of the vote. Rampton's victory was despite incumbent Republican president Richard Nixon winning the state with over 67% of the vote in the concurrent presidential election. The election made Rampton the first governor to serve three terms.

== Vermont ==
1972 Vermont gubernatorial election
- November 7, 1972
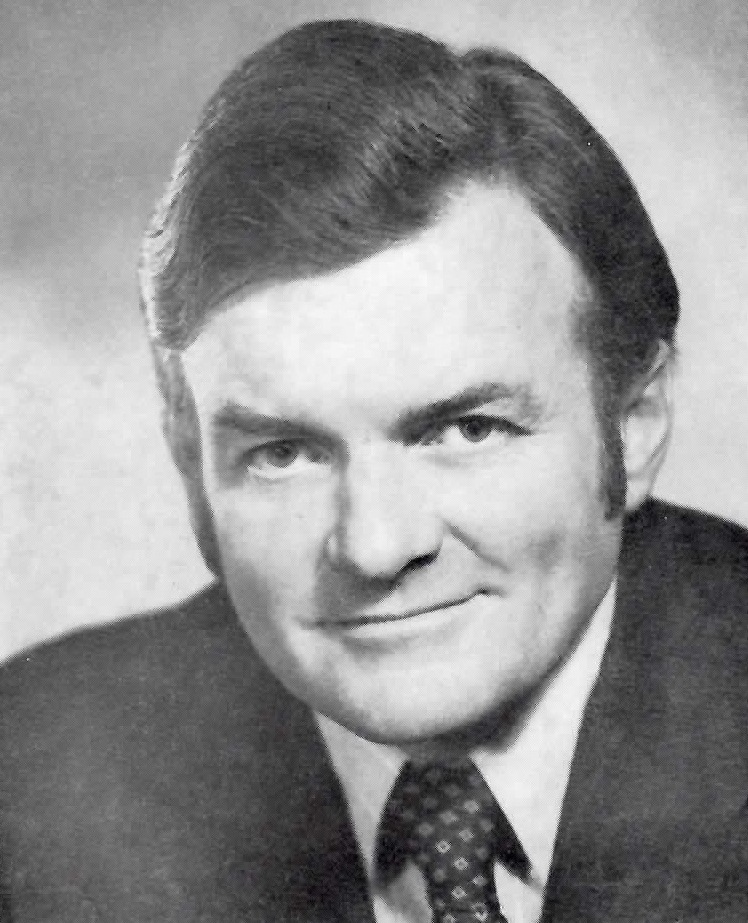

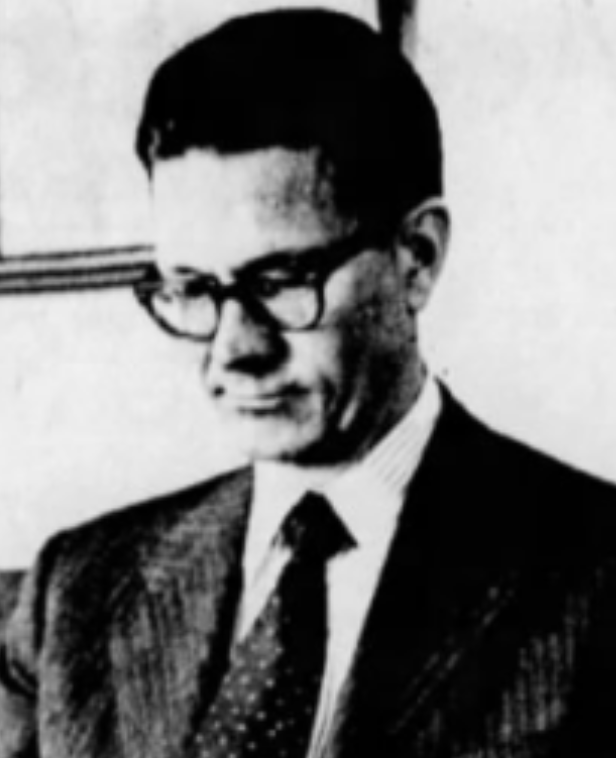
Nominee	Thomas P. Salmon	Luther F. Hackett
Party	Democratic	Republican
Popular vote	104,533	82,491
Percentage	55.3%	43.6%
- County results Salmon: 40–50% 50–60% 60–70% Hackett: 40–50% 50–60%
Governor before election
Deane C. Davis
Republican
Elected Governor
Thomas P. Salmon
Democratic

The 1972 Vermont gubernatorial election took place on November 7, 1972. The incumbent Republican Governor Deane C. Davis was not a candidate for re-election to another term as governor of Vermont. The Democratic nominee, Thomas P. Salmon, defeated the Republican nominee, Luther F. Hackett, to become his successor. Future U.S. senator and presidential candidate Bernie Sanders ran as a member of the Liberty Union Party.

== Washington ==
1972 Washington gubernatorial election
- November 7, 1972
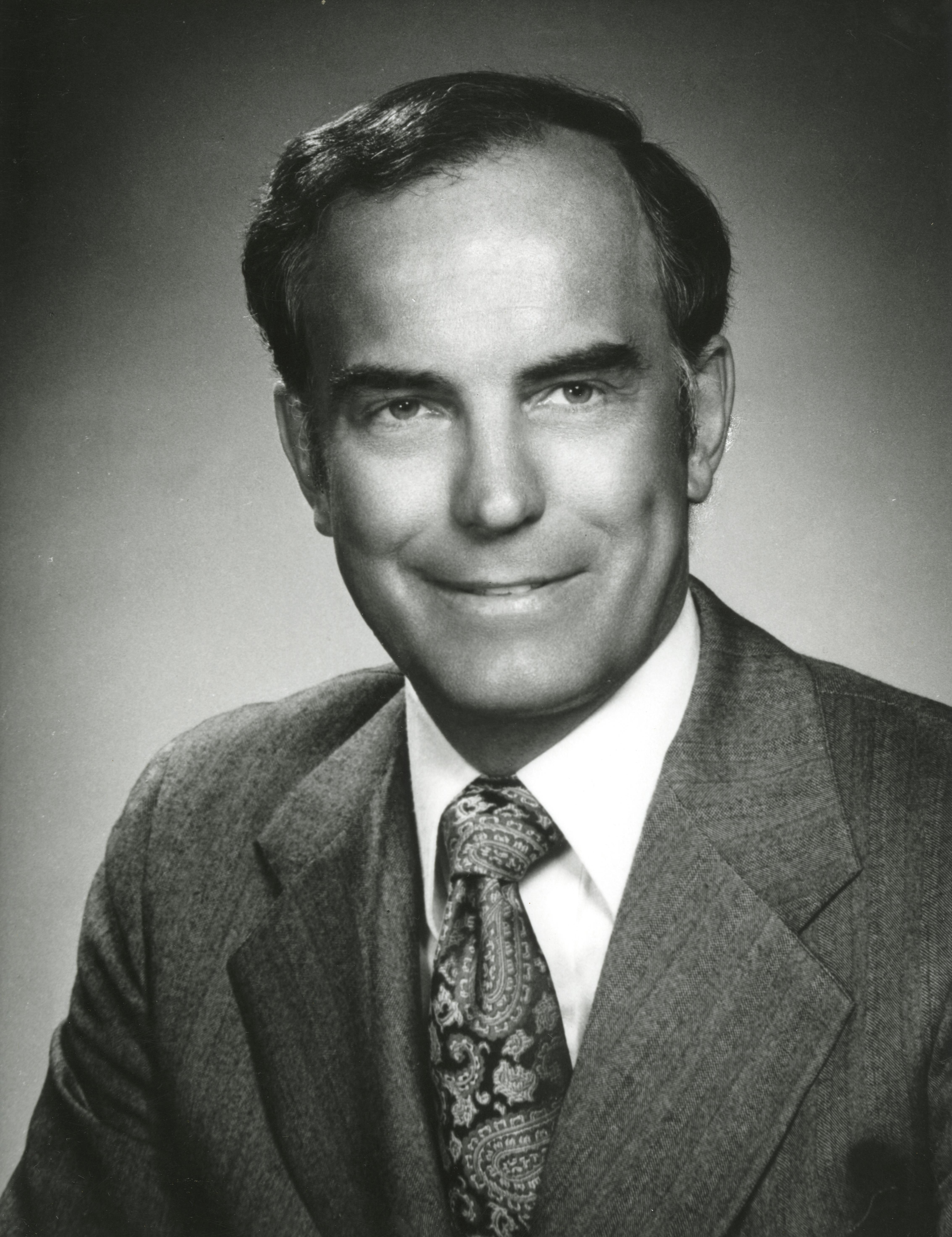

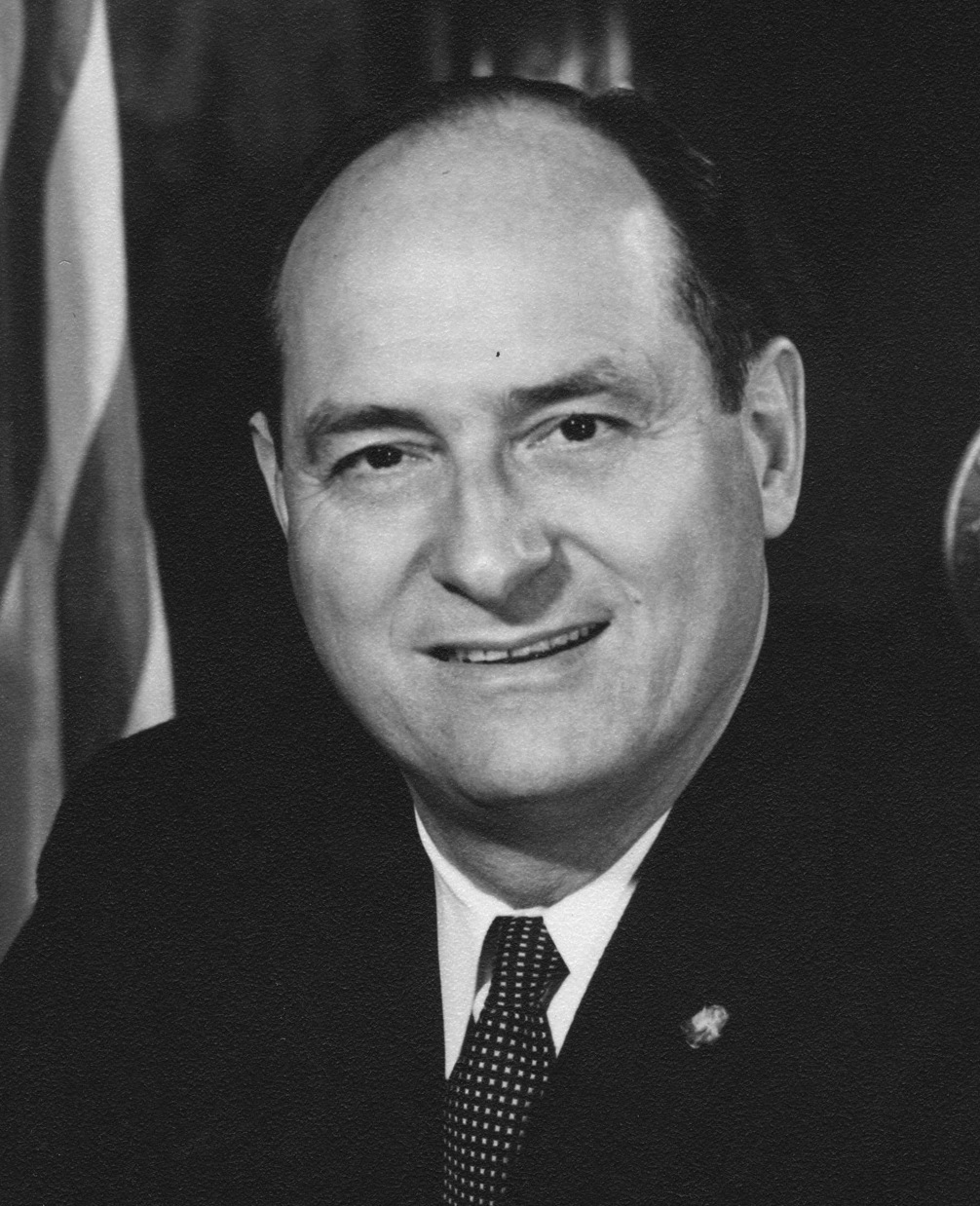

Nominee	Daniel J. Evans	Albert Rosellini	Vick Gould
Party	Republican	Democratic	Taxpayers
Popular vote	747,825	630,613	86,843
Percentage	50.78%	42.82%	5.90%
- County results Evans: 40–50% 50–60% 60–70% Rosellini: 40–50% 50–60% 60–70%
Governor before election
Daniel J. Evans
Republican
Elected Governor
Daniel J. Evans
Republican

The 1972 Washington gubernatorial election was held on November 7, 1972. Incumbent Governor of Washington Daniel J. Evans, who was first elected eight years earlier, and then re-elected in 1968, was eligible for re-election, as Washington does not have gubernatorial term limits.

On election day, Evans defeated former governor Albert D. Rosellini by a comfortable margin of 51% to 43% in a rematch of the 1964 contest.

== West Virginia ==
1972 West Virginia gubernatorial election
- November 7, 1972
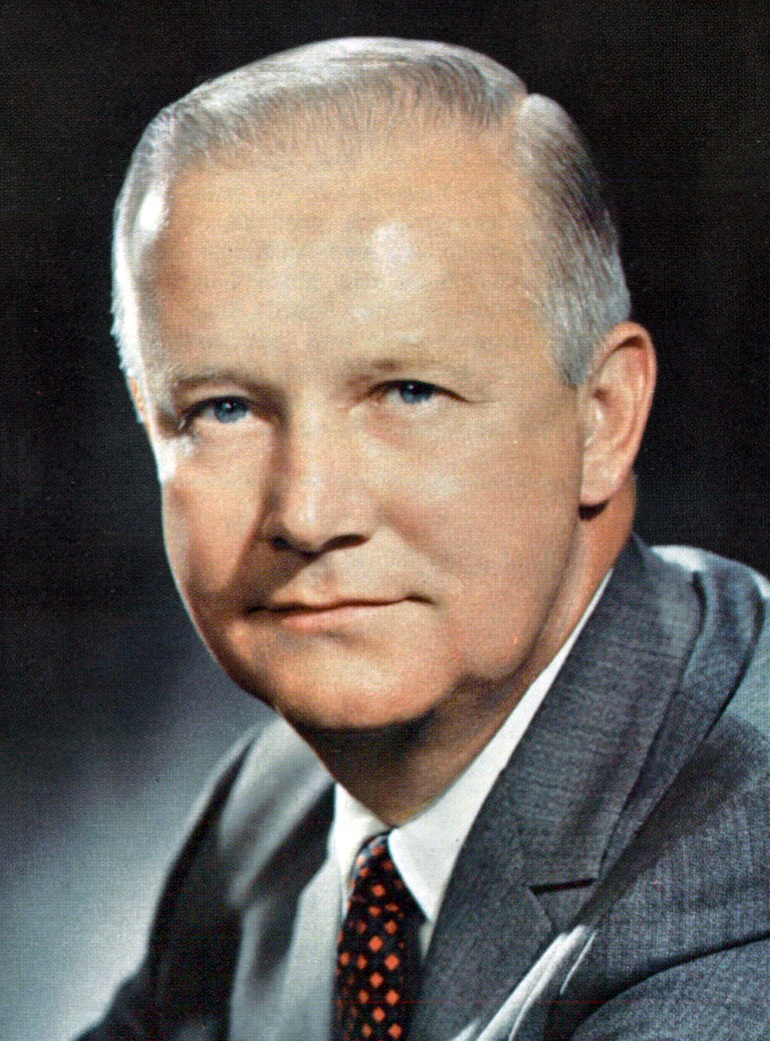

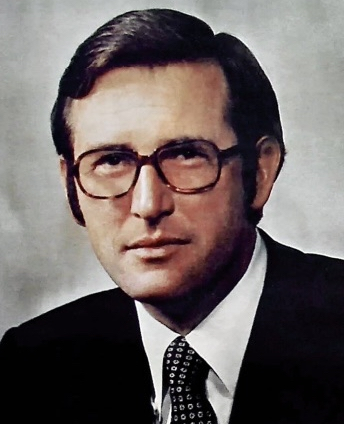
Nominee	Arch A. Moore Jr.	Jay Rockefeller
Party	Republican	Democratic
Popular vote	423,817	350,462
Percentage	54.74%	45.26%
- County results Moore: 50–60% 60–70% 70–80% Rockefeller: 50–60%
Governor before election
Arch A. Moore Jr.
Republican
Elected Governor
Arch A. Moore Jr.
Republican

The 1972 West Virginia gubernatorial election took place on November 7, 1972, to elect the governor of West Virginia. Incumbent Governor Arch A. Moore, Jr. successfully ran for reelection to a second term. This was the first time a governor was reelected to a second four-year term in state history, and the first time a governor had been reelected since 1872.

== See also ==
- 1972 United States elections
  - 1972 United States presidential election
  - 1972 United States Senate elections
  - 1972 United States House of Representatives elections
