= Robert C. Londerholm =

American politician

35th Kansas Attorney General
- In office January 11, 1965 – January 13, 1969
- Governor: William H. Avery; Robert Docking
- Preceded by: William M. Ferguson
- Succeeded by: Kent Frizzell

Personal details
- Born: July 5, 1931; Kansas City, Missouri
- Died: December 18, 2015 (aged 84); Redwood City, California
- Political party: Republican

Robert C. Londerholm (July 5, 1931 – December 18, 2015) was an American politician who served as the Attorney General of Kansas from 1965 to 1969.

He died on December 18, 2015, in Redwood City, California at age 84.

Party political offices
Preceded by William M. Ferguson	Republican nominee for Kansas Attorney General; 1964, 1966	Succeeded by Kent Frizzell
