= Don O. Concannon =

American politician

Chairman Donald Owen Concannon

Chairman of the Kansas Republican Party
- In office August 1968 – August 1970
- Preceded by: William Falstad
- Succeeded by: George Nettles

Personal details
- Born: October 28, 1927 Garden City, Kansas
- Died: March 9, 2013 (age 85) Beloit, Kansas
- Party: Republican
- Spouse(s): Patricia Concannon 1952-2001; Sharon Concannon 2002-2013
- Children: 3 Chris, Craig, Debra
- Education: Garden City Junior College; Washburn Law School
- Occupation: Lawyer

Military service
- Allegiance: United States
- Branch/service: United States Navy
- Years of service: 1945
- Rank: Seaman

Donald Owen Concannon (October 28, 1927 – March 9, 2013) was an American attorney and unsuccessful political candidate for the United States Republican Party in Kansas.

== Early life ==
Concannon was born on a farm 20 miles outside Garden City, Kansas. He enlisted in the United States Navy on May 1, 1945, and served in the South Pacific. After World War II, he studied at Garden City Junior College and Washburn University.

== Career ==
=== Political career ===
Following his demobilization after World War II, Concannon moved to Hugoton, Kansas, and was elected Stevens County attorney from 1953 to 1957. He was also elected the city attorney for Satanta, Kansas, from 1956 to 1962. He was also elected the President of the Kansas Young Republican Federation in 1959 and served until 1961. He was named the Chairman of the Kansas Presidential Electors for the 1960 United States presidential election. He served on Democratic governor Robert Docking'sHighway Advisory Commission from 1965 to 1966. He would be elected the chairman of the Kansas Republican Party serving between 1968 and 1970. He was the leader of the Nixon campaign in Kansas for the 1972 United States presidential election and the Reagan campaign in Kansas for the 1976 Republican Party presidential primaries. He would have an unsuccessful candidate in the primaries during the 1974 gubernatorial elections, narrowly losing to Robert Frederick Bennett by just 0.26% of the vote, or 530 individual votes out of 207,937 votes cast. He supported Sam Hardage in the 1982 Kansas gubernatorial election and worked on his unsuccessful campaign. From 1986 to 1988 he worked as Chairman of Governor Mike Hayden's Task Force on the Future of Rural Communities as well as being a member of the Kansas Commission for the Bicentennial of U.S. Constitution. In 1992 he led the unsuccessful West Kansas secessionist movement which sought to create a separate state for the more rural South-West portion of the state.

=== Banking career ===
Alongside his lengthy political career, Concannon also worked for a number of banks. From 1965 to 1966 and from 1972 to 1974 he was the President and Chairman of the Fortune Insurance Company. In 1974 he was named to the Board of Directors for Norton Bankshares as well as the First State Bank of Norton, Kansas, the State bank of Satanta, Kansas and the First National Bank of Attica, Kansas.

== Personal life ==
Concannon was a close personal friend to United States Senator Jerry Moran who described him as "a great man, a strong advocate and a dedicated public servant." He was also a member of the American Legion and was a Freemason. He was a lifelong member of the Delta Theta Phi and Kappa Sigma fraternities. He was married to Patricia Née June Davis from November 23, 1952 until her death on February 25, 2001. He remarried Sharon Née Collins on September 1, 2002. He had two sons Chris, who predeceased him, and Craig as well as a daughter Debra Traster.

== Election results ==
1974 Kansas gubernatorial election Republican primary
Party	Candidate	Votes	%
Republican	Robert Frederick Bennett	67,347	32.39
Republican	Don O. Concannon	66,817	32.13
Republican	Forrest J. Robinson	56,440	27.14
Republican	Bob Clack	17,333	8.34
Total votes		207,937	100.00
