= Curt T. Schneider =

American politician

38th Kansas Attorney General
- In office January 13, 1975 – January 8, 1979
- Governor: Robert Frederick Bennett
- Preceded by: Vern Miller
- Succeeded by: Robert Stephan

Personal details
- Born: October 12, 1943 (age 81); Coffeyville, Kansas
- Political party: Democratic

Curt T. Schneider (born October 12, 1943) is an American politician who served as the Attorney General of Kansas from 1975 to 1979.

Party political offices
Preceded by Vern Miller	Democratic nominee for Kansas Attorney General; 1974, 1978	Succeeded by Lance Burr
