= Lawrence Gates =

American attorney

Lawrence Gates is an American attorney and the former chair of the Kansas Democratic Party. During his tenure, the Democrats were able to win top offices and make gains in the Kansas Legislature by appealing to moderate Republican and independent voters.

== Personal life and public service ==
Gates graduated from the University of Kansas. Gates has raised funds for disaster relief and serves as a governance boardmember for the nonprofit Community Living Opportunities, Inc. whose mission it is to help people with severe developmental disabilities.

== Career ==
Gates founded the law firm Gates, Biles, Shields & Ryan, P.A. in 1980 and is active in the real estate business.
