= Kent Frizzell =

American attorney and politician

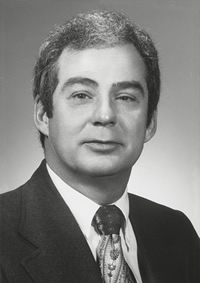

United States Secretary of the Interior
- Acting
- In office October 9, 1975 – October 17, 1975
- President: Gerald Ford
- Preceded by: Stanley K. Hathaway
- Succeeded by: Thomas S. Kleppe
- In office April 30, 1975 – June 12, 1975
- President: Gerald Ford
- Preceded by: Rogers Morton
- Succeeded by: Stanley K. Hathaway

Attorney General of Kansas
- In office January 13, 1969 – January 11, 1971
- Governor: Robert Docking
- Preceded by: Robert C. Londerholm
- Succeeded by: Vern Miller

Personal details
- Born: Dale Kent Frizzell; February 11, 1929 Wichita, Kansas, U.S.
- Died: October 26, 2016 (aged 87) Tulsa, Oklahoma, U.S.
- Party: Republican
- Spouse: Shirley Piatt
- Children: 5, including Gregory
- Education: Friends University (BA); Washburn University (JD)

Dale Kent Frizzell (February 11, 1929 – October 26, 2016) was an American attorney and politician from the state of Kansas. He served as a state senator in the Kansas State Senate from 1965 to 1967, and as Attorney General of Kansas from 1969 to 1971.

== Education ==
He was an alumnus of the Friends University, and Washburn University Law School.

== Career ==
Frizzell also served as United States Under Secretary of the Interior from 1975 to 1977, and as Assistant Attorney General for the Environment and Natural Resources from 1972 to 1973. He died on October 26, 2016.

Party political offices
Preceded by Robert C. Londerholm	Republican nominee for Attorney General of Kansas; 1968	Succeeded by Richard Seaton
Preceded by Rick Harman	Republican nominee Governor of Kansas; 1970	Succeeded by Morris Kay
Legal offices
Preceded by Robert C. Londerholm	Republican nominee for Attorney General of Kansas; 1969–1971	Succeeded by Vern Miller
Political offices
Preceded by Rogers Morton	United States Secretary of the Interior; Acting; 1975	Succeeded by Stanley K. Hathaway
Preceded by Stanley K. Hathaway	United States Secretary of the Interior; Acting; 1975	Succeeded by Thomas S. Kleppe
