= 1968 Kansas gubernatorial election =

- November 5, 1968
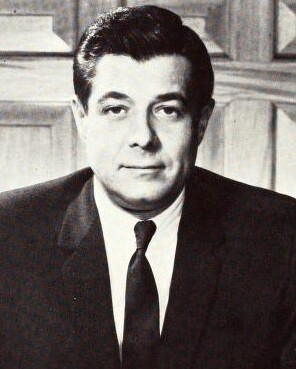

Nominee	Robert Docking	Rick Harman
Party	Democratic	Republican
Popular vote	447,269	410,673
Percentage	51.86%	47.62%
- County results Docking: 50–60% 60–70% Harman: 40–50% 50–60% 60–70%
Governor before election
Robert Docking
Democratic
Elected Governor
Robert Docking
Democratic

The 1968 Kansas gubernatorial election was held on November 5, 1968. Incumbent Democrat Robert Docking narrowly defeated Republican nominee Rick Harman with 51.9% of the vote.

== Primary elections ==
Primary elections were held on August 6, 1968.

=== Republican primary ===
==== Candidates ====
- Rick Harman, businessman
- John Crutcher, incumbent Lieutenant Governor
- Raymond J. Vanskiver

==== Results ====
Republican primary results
Party	Candidate	Votes	%
Republican	Rick Harman	133,454	48.89
Republican	John Crutcher	128,635	47.13
Republican	Raymond J. Vanskiver	10,879	3.99
Total votes		272,968	100.00

== General election ==
=== Candidates ===
Major party candidates

- Robert Docking, Democratic
- Rick Harman, Republican

Other candidates

- Marshall Uncapher, Prohibition

=== Results ===
1968 Kansas gubernatorial election
Party	Candidate	Votes	%	±%
Democratic	Robert Docking (incumbent)	447,269	51.86%	
Republican	Rick Harman	410,673	47.62%	
Prohibition	Marshall Uncapher	4,528	0.53%	
Majority		36,596		
Turnout		862,473		
Democratic hold		Swing		
