= Vern Miller =

American attorney (1928–2021)

Kansas Attorney General
- In office January 11, 1971 – January 13, 1975
- Governor: Robert Docking
- Preceded by: Kent Frizzell
- Succeeded by: Curt T. Schneider

Personal details
- Born: December 22, 1928 Wichita, Kansas, U.S.
- Died: June 11, 2021 (aged 92) Mesa, Arizona, U.S.
- Party: Democratic
- Spouse: Paula
- Children: 4
- Education: Oklahoma City University (LLB) 1966

Vern Miller (December 22, 1928 – June 11, 2021) was an American attorney, politician, and law enforcement officer who served as the Kansas attorney general from 1971 to 1975.

== Early life and education ==
Miller was born in Wichita, Kansas, in 1928. At three years old, his family moved to a 10-acre farm in the city, raising cows and selling milk. He attended primary schools there, and attended Wichita North High School. He enlisted in the U.S. Army at 17, turning 18 while he was posted to post-WWII U.S. occupation zone in Korea. After his service he attended Friends University. He later graduated from Oklahoma City University School of Law in 1966, driving 310 miles round trip to attend night school.

== Career ==
He served as deputy sheriff of Sedgwick County, Kansas, from 1949 to 1954, and in 1958 was elected as Sedgwick County marshal. After two terms as marshal, Miller served two terms as sheriff of Sedgwick County. As a Wichita, Kansas, police laboratory investigator, he was called out to the crime scene of the Earl and Ruth Bowlin murders in Sedgwick County on April 13, 1963. He was elected Sedgwick County sheriff in 1964 and re-elected twice.

=== Kansas attorney general ===
Though he had never previously tried a case, he was first elected as Attorney General of Kansas in 1970 under a platform of "aggressive and visible enforcement of the state's drug and liquor laws". As attorney general, Miller participated in arrests and drug raids himself; a 1971 article detailed a Wichita drug raid in which Miller hid in the trunk of a car of an undercover agent in order to make arrests. When he was re-elected in 1972, he had gained widespread popularity across the state, winning in all of the counties. He served as attorney general until 1975. Miller made national news in 1972 when he ordered the raid of Amtrak trains that were serving liquor or wine while passing through Kansas, and in 1973, threatened to prosecute airlines that served intoxicating beverages while flying over the state. Miller sent letters requesting Braniff International, TWA, and Continental halt sale in respect for state law, and told reporters that he had gotten a telegram from one airline promising to suspend beverages while over Kansas.

=== 1974 Kansas gubernatorial election ===
In 1974, he was the Democratic nominee for governor of Kansas, losing by 0.49% to Republican Robert Frederick Bennett. Miller then served as Sedgwick County Prosecuting Attorney from 1976 to 1980 and opened up a law practice in his hometown of Wichita.

== Personal life ==
In 2009, the book Vern Miller: Legendary Kansas Lawman by Mike Danford, detailing Miller's life, was published. He was married twice, and had three children and a stepchild. One of his sons, Clifford Miller, was a police sergeant in Sedgwick County. Miller was a member of the Presbyterian Church, Kansas Bar Association, American Judicature Society, and Wichita Bar Association. He was a former president of the Kansas Peace Officers Association.

Miller died on June 11, 2021, at his home in Mesa, Arizona, at the age of 92.

Legal offices
Preceded by Kent Frizzell	Attorney General of Kansas; 1971–1975	Succeeded by Curt T. Schneider
Party political offices
Preceded by Jerry Muth	Democratic nominee for Kansas Attorney General; 1970, 1972	Succeeded by Curt T. Schneider
Preceded by Robert Docking	Democratic nominee for Governor of Kansas; 1974	Succeeded by John W. Carlin
