= William M. Ferguson =

American politician

34th Kansas Attorney General
- In office January 9, 1961 – January 11, 1965
- Governor: John Anderson Jr.
- Preceded by: John Anderson Jr.
- Succeeded by: Robert C. Londerholm

Personal details
- Born: William McDonald Ferguson; December 2, 1917 Wellington, Kansas
- Died: June 9, 2005 (aged 87) Wichita, Kansas
- Party: Republican
- Education: University of Kansas (BA); Harvard Law School (LLB)

William M. Ferguson (December 2, 1917 – June 9, 2005) was an American politician who served as the Attorney General of Kansas from 1965 to 1969.
