= James H. DeCoursey Jr. =

American politician

James H. DeCoursey, Jr.

36th Lieutenant Governor of Kansas
- In office January 13, 1969 – January 11, 1971
- Governor: Robert Docking
- Preceded by: John Crutcher
- Succeeded by: Reynolds Shultz

Personal details
- Born: July 7, 1932 Kansas City, Kansas, U.S.
- Died: October 17, 2016 (aged 84) Topeka, Kansas, U.S.
- Party: Democratic
- Education: University of Kansas; University of Notre Dame
- Occupation: Lawyer

James Henry DeCoursey Jr. (July 7, 1932 – October 17, 2016) was an American politician who served as the 36th lieutenant governor of Kansas from 1969 to 1971. DeCoursey was an alumnus of the University of Kansas and University of Notre Dame and held Bachelor of Laws and Bachelor of Science (Finance) degrees. He died in 2016 at the age of 84.

Party political offices
Preceded by Keith Martin	Democratic nominee for Lieutenant Governor of Kansas; 1966, 1968	Succeeded by Richard J. Rome
Political offices
Preceded by John Crutcher	Lieutenant Governor of Kansas; 1969–1971	Succeeded by Reynolds Shultz
