= 1978 Kansas gubernatorial election =

- November 7, 1978
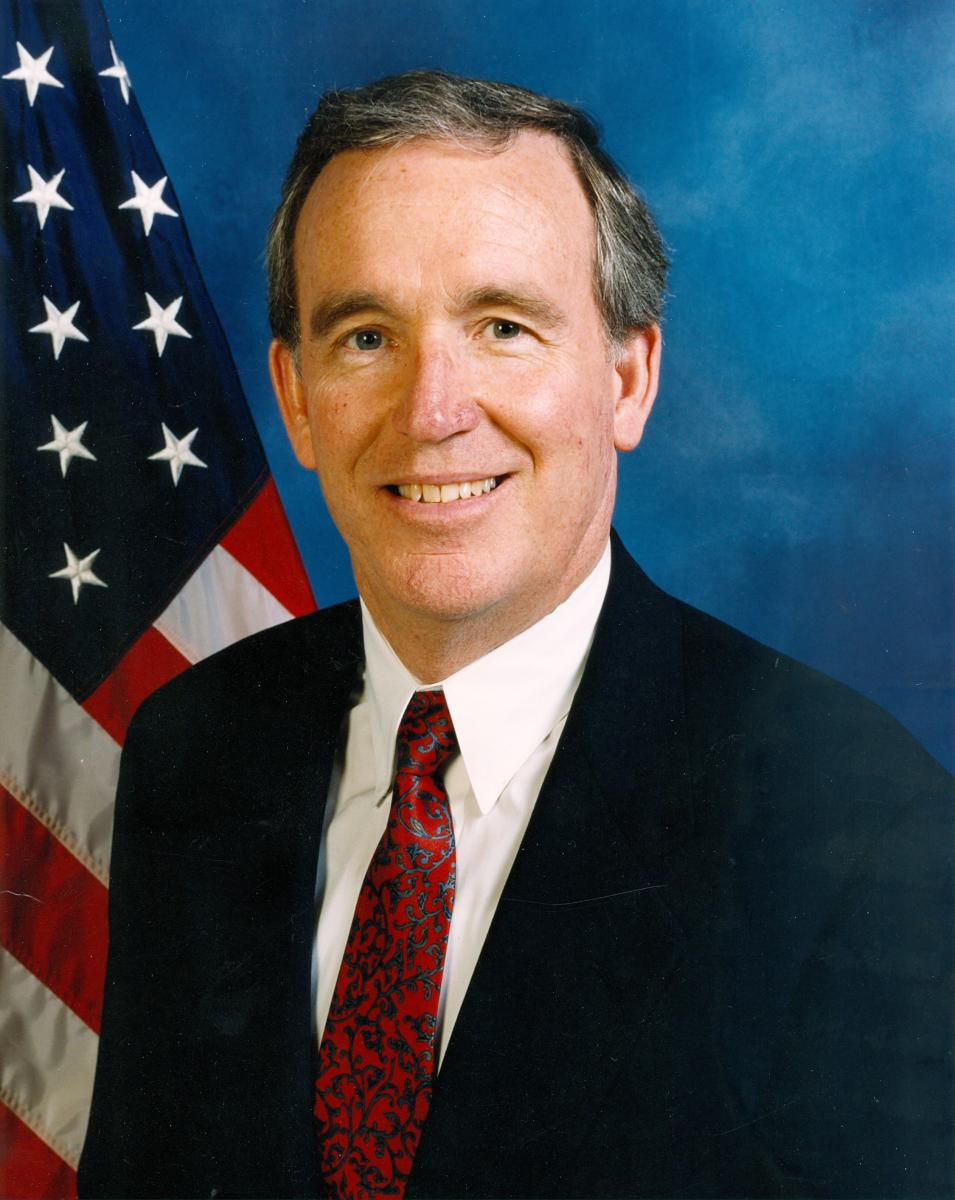

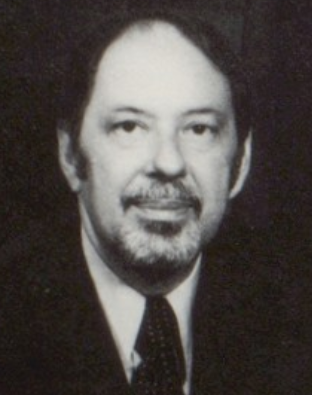
| Nominee | John W. Carlin | Robert F. Bennett |
| Party | Democratic | Republican |
| Running mate | Paul Dugan | Larry Montgomery |
| Popular vote | 363,835 | 348,015 |
| Percentage | 49.42% | 47.27% |
- County results Carlin: 40–50% 50–60% 60–70% Bennett: 40–50% 50–60% 60–70%
Governor before election
Robert Frederick Bennett
Republican
Elected Governor
John W. Carlin
Democratic

The 1978 Kansas gubernatorial election was held on November 7, 1978. Democratic nominee John W. Carlin defeated incumbent Republican Robert Frederick Bennett with 49.4% of the vote.

== Primary elections ==
Primary elections were held on August 1, 1978.

=== Democratic primary ===
==== Candidates ====
- John W. Carlin, Speaker of the Kansas House of Representatives
- Bert Chaney
- Harry G. Wiles

==== Results ====
Democratic primary results
| Party | Candidate | Votes | % |
|---|---|---|---|
| Democratic | John W. Carlin | 71,366 | 55.21 |
| Democratic | Bert Chaney | 34,132 | 26.41 |
| Democratic | Harry G. Wiles | 23,762 | 18.38 |
| Total votes | | 129,260 | 100.00 |

=== Republican primary ===
==== Candidates ====
- Robert Frederick Bennett, incumbent Governor
- Robert R. "Bob" Sanders
- Harold Knight

==== Results ====
Republican primary results
| Party | Candidate | Votes | % |
|---|---|---|---|
| Republican | Robert Frederick Bennett (incumbent) | 142,239 | 69.23 |
| Republican | Robert R. "Bob" Sanders | 40,542 | 19.73 |
| Republican | Harold Knight | 22,671 | 11.04 |
| Total votes | | 205,452 | 100.00 |

== General election ==
=== Candidates ===
Major party candidates

- John W. Carlin, Democratic
- Robert Frederick Bennett, Republican

Other candidates

- Frank W. Shelton Jr., American
- Berry Beets, Prohibition

=== Results ===
1978 Kansas gubernatorial election
| Party | Candidate | Votes | % | ±% |
|---|---|---|---|---|
| Democratic | John W. Carlin | 363,835 | 49.42% | |
| Republican | Robert Frederick Bennett (incumbent) | 348,015 | 47.27% | |
| American | Frank W. Shelton Jr. | 17,053 | 2.32% | |
| Prohibition | Berry Beets | 7,343 | 1.00% | |
| Majority | | 15,820 | | |
| Turnout | | 736,246 | | |
| Democratic gain from Republican | | Swing | | |
