= 1974 Kansas gubernatorial election =

- November 5, 1974
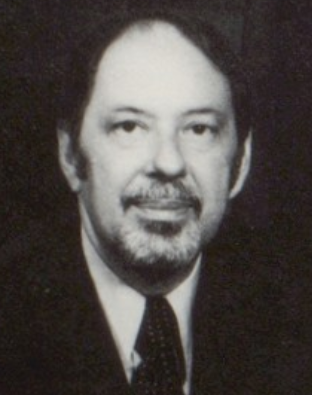

Nominee	Robert F. Bennett	Vern Miller
Party	Republican	Democratic
Running mate	Shelby Smith	Jack Steineger
Popular vote	387,792	384,115
Percentage	49.47%	49.00%
- County results Bennett: 40–50% 50–60% 60–70% Miller: 40–50% 50–60% 60–70%
Governor before election
Robert Docking
Democratic
Elected Governor
Robert Frederick Bennett
Republican

The 1974 Kansas gubernatorial election was held on November 5, 1974. Republican nominee Robert Frederick Bennett narrowly defeated Democratic nominee Vern Miller with 49.5% of the vote.

As of 2026, this marks the last occasion in which the following counties have voted Democratic in a gubernatorial election: Clark, Morton, Stanton, and Stevens. This was also the first gubernatorial election for the state of Kansas to elect a governor for a four-year term.

== Primary elections ==
Primary elections were held on August 6, 1974.

=== Republican primary ===
==== Candidates ====
- Robert Frederick Bennett, president of the Kansas Senate
- Bob Clack
- Don O. Concannon, former president of the Kansas Republican Party
- Forrest J. Robinson, former minister of the First United Methodist Church of Wichita

==== Results ====
Republican primary results
Party	Candidate	Votes	%
Republican	Robert Frederick Bennett	67,347	32.39
Republican	Don O. Concannon	66,817	32.13
Republican	Forrest J. Robinson	56,440	27.14
Republican	Bob Clack	17,333	8.34
Total votes		207,937	100.00

== General election ==
=== Candidates ===
Major party candidates

- Robert Frederick Bennett, Republican
- Vern Miller, Democratic

Other candidates

- Marshall Uncapher, Prohibition

=== Results ===
1974 Kansas gubernatorial election
Party	Candidate	Votes	%	±%
Republican	Robert Frederick Bennett	387,792	49.47%	
Democratic	Vern Miller	384,115	49.00%	
Prohibition	Marshall Uncapher	11,968	1.53%	
Majority		3,677		
Turnout		783,875		
Republican gain from Democratic		Swing		
