= 1970 Kansas gubernatorial election =

- November 3, 1970
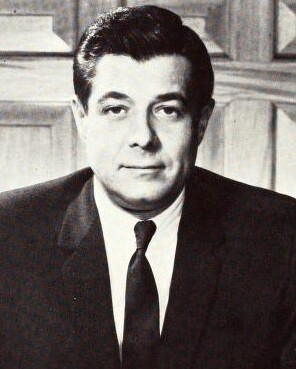

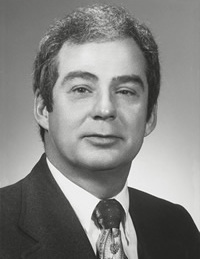
Nominee	Robert Docking	Kent Frizzell
Party	Democratic	Republican
Popular vote	404,611	333,227
Percentage	54.30%	44.72%
- County results Docking: 40–50% 50–60% 60–70% Frizzell: 40–50% 50–60% 60–70%
Governor before election
Robert Docking
Democratic
Elected Governor
Robert Docking
Democratic

The 1970 Kansas gubernatorial election was held on November 3, 1970. Incumbent Democrat Robert Docking defeated Republican nominee Kent Frizzell with 54.3% of the vote.

== Primary elections ==
Primary elections were held on August 4, 1970.

=== Republican primary ===
==== Candidates ====
- Kent Frizzell, Attorney General of Kansas
- Rick Harman, businessman
- Raymond J. Vanskiver
- Donald Conard
- Joseph Lindahl

==== Results ====
Republican primary results
Party	Candidate	Votes	%
Republican	Kent Frizzell	141,298	60.47
Republican	Rick Harman	78,086	33.42
Republican	Raymond J. Vanskiver	6,891	2.95
Republican	Donald Conard	4,436	1.90
Republican	Joseph Lindahl	2,940	1.26
Total votes		233,651	100.00

== General election ==
=== Candidates ===
Major party candidates

- Robert Docking, Democratic
- Kent Frizzell, Republican

Other candidates

- P. Everett Sperry, Independent
- Marshall Uncapher, Prohibition

=== Results ===
1970 Kansas gubernatorial election
Party	Candidate	Votes	%	±%
Democratic	Robert Docking (incumbent)	404,611	54.30%	
Republican	Kent Frizzell	333,227	44.72%	
Independent	P. Everett Sperry	4,312	0.58%	
Prohibition	Marshall Uncapher	3,040	0.41%	
Majority		71,384		
Turnout		745,196		
Democratic hold		Swing		
