= Morris Kay =

American politician (1932–2022)

Member of the Kansas House of Representatives from the 40th district
- In office January 9, 1967 – January 8, 1973
- Preceded by: Richard Dean Rogers
- Succeeded by: Carlos Cooper

Personal details
- Born: July 31, 1932 St. John, Kansas, U.S.
- Died: May 15, 2022 (aged 89) Overland Park, Kansas, U.S.
- Party: Republican
- Spouse: Sandra Kay
- Children: Brad Kay, Jacob Kay
- Education: University of Kansas
- Occupation: insurance executive, businessman

Military service
- Allegiance: United States
- Branch/service: United States Army

Morris A. Kay (July 31, 1932 – May 15, 2022) was an American politician in the state of Kansas. A Republican, he served in the Kansas House of Representatives.

Kay was born in St. John, Kansas and attended primary schooling there while helping his father on the family farm. He attended the University of Kansas, where he played college football, captaining the 1953 Kansas Jayhawks football team. He also served in the United States Army. He was later an insurance executive. Kay was the Republican candidate for Governor of Kansas in the 1972 gubernatorial election, losing to incumbent Governor Robert Docking. At that time he was serving as majority leader of the Kansas House of Representatives. From January 1979 to June 27, 1982, he served as the Kansas Republican Party chairman.

Kay died on May 15, 2022, at the age of 89.

Party political offices
Preceded by Kent Frizzell	Republican nominee Governor of Kansas; 1972	Succeeded by Robert Frederick Bennett
