= Reynolds Shultz =

American politician

37th Lieutenant Governor of Kansas
- In office January 11, 1971 – January 8, 1973
- Governor: Robert Docking
- Preceded by: James H. DeCoursey, Jr.
- Succeeded by: Dave Owen

Member of the Kansas State Senate from the 2nd District
- In office 1969–1970
- Succeeded by: Arden Booth

Member of the Kansas State Senate from the 6th District
- In office 1965–1968

Personal details
- Born: August 4, 1921 Jefferson County, Kansas, U.S.
- Died: January 24, 2000 (aged 78) Oskaloosa, Kansas, U.S.
- Party: Republican
- Spouse(s): Donna Lee Thompson (m. 1941); Judy Nelson Mansfield (m. 1985)
- Children: 3

Reynolds "Ren" Shultz (August 4, 1921 – January 24, 2000) was an American politician. He was the 37th Lieutenant Governor of Kansas from 1971 to 1973, having previously served in the Kansas Senate since 1965. He served in the United States Marine Corps in World War II.

Party political offices
Preceded by John Conard	Republican nominee for Lieutenant Governor of Kansas; 1970	Succeeded by Dave Owen
Political offices
Preceded by James H. DeCoursey, Jr.	Lieutenant Governor of Kansas; 1971–1973	Succeeded by Dave Owen
