= Howard Shultz Miller =

American politician

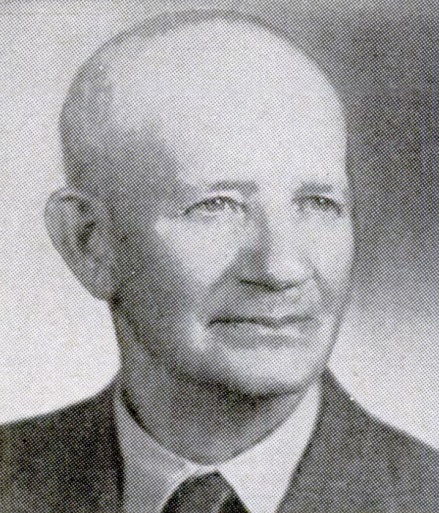

Member of the U.S. House of Representatives from Kansas's 1st district
- In office January 3, 1953 – January 3, 1955
- Preceded by: Albert M. Cole
- Succeeded by: William H. Avery

Personal details
- Born: February 27, 1879 Somerset County, Pennsylvania, U.S.
- Died: January 2, 1970 (aged 90) Hiawatha, Kansas, U.S.
- Party: Democratic

Howard Shultz Miller (February 27, 1879 – January 2, 1970) was an American politician. He served as a U.S. representative from Kansas.

== Biography ==
Born in Somerset County, Pennsylvania, Miller moved with his family to Morrill, Kansas in 1882. He attended the public schools of Brown County, and Sabetha (Kansas) High School. He taught school from 1894 to 1899. Miller graduated from the University of Nebraska College of Law in 1900. He was admitted to the bar in 1901 and began law practice in Kansas. He engaged in agricultural pursuits and worked as a lawyer from 1901 to 1952.

Miller was elected as a Democrat to the Eighty-third Congress (January 3, 1953 – January 3, 1955). He was an unsuccessful candidate for reelection in 1954 to the Eighty-fourth Congress and for election in 1956 to the Eighty-fifth Congress. He is the only Democrat in history to represent Kansas' 1st congressional district.

Miller died on January 2, 1970, in Hiawatha, Kansas, and is interred at Morrill Cemetery, Morrill, Kansas.

U.S. House of Representatives
Preceded by Albert M. Cole	Member of the U.S. House of Representatives from Kansas's 1st congressional district 1953–1955	Succeeded by William H. Avery
