= 1972 Kansas gubernatorial election =

- November 7, 1972
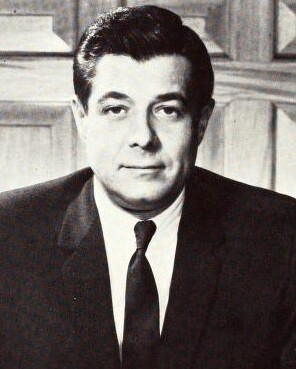

Nominee	Robert Docking	Morris Kay
Party	Democratic	Republican
Popular vote	571,256	341,440
Percentage	61.99%	37.05%
- County results Docking: 40–50% 50–60% 60–70% 70–80% Kay: 50–60%
Governor before election
Robert Docking
Democratic
Elected Governor
Robert Docking
Democratic

The 1972 Kansas gubernatorial election was held on November 7, 1972. Incumbent Democrat Robert Docking defeated Republican nominee Morris Kay with 62.0% of the vote.

== Primary elections ==
Primary elections were held on August 1, 1972.

=== Republican primary ===
==== Candidates ====
- John Anderson Jr., former governor
- Ray E. Frisbie, president of the Kansas Farm Bureau
- Morris Kay, state representative
- Reynolds Shultz, incumbent lieutenant governor

==== Results ====
Republican primary results
Party	Candidate	Votes	%
Republican	Morris Kay	138,815	46.59
Republican	John Anderson Jr.	88,088	29.57
Republican	Ray E. Frisbie	46,125	15.48
Republican	Reynolds Shultz	24,911	8.36
Total votes		297,939	100.00

== General election ==
=== Candidates ===
Major party candidates

- Robert Docking, Democratic
- Morris Kay, Republican

Other candidates

- Rolland Ernest Fisher, Prohibition

=== Results ===
1972 Kansas gubernatorial election
Party	Candidate	Votes	%	±%
Democratic	Robert Docking (incumbent)	571,256	61.99%	
Republican	Morris Kay	341,440	37.05%	
Prohibition	Rolland Ernest Fisher	8,856	0.96%	
Majority		229,818		
Turnout		921,550		
Democratic hold		Swing		
