= John Crutcher =

American politician

John W. Crutcher

35th Lieutenant Governor of Kansas
- In office January 11, 1965 – January 13, 1969
- Governor: William H. Avery; Robert Docking
- Preceded by: Harold H. Chase
- Succeeded by: James H. DeCoursey, Jr.

Personal details
- Born: December 19, 1916 Ensign, Kansas, U.S.
- Died: March 13, 2017 (aged 100) Jefferson, North Carolina, U.S.
- Party: Republican
- Education: University of Kansas
- Occupation: real estate/insurance broker

John William Crutcher (December 19, 1916 – March 13, 2017) was an American politician. Crutcher served in the Kansas State Senate from 1953 to 1957. He was the 35th Lieutenant Governor of Kansas from 1965 to 1969. Crutcher served as Commissioner of the Postal Rate Commission from 1982 to 1993, and as a member of the National Transportation Policy Study Commission. He was an alumnus of the University of Kansas (1940) and a veteran of the United States Navy and United States Naval Reserve.

Crutcher died at his home in Jefferson, North Carolina in March 2017 at the age of 100.

Party political offices
Preceded by Harold H. Chase	Republican nominee for Lieutenant Governor of Kansas; 1964, 1966	Succeeded by John Conard
Political offices
Preceded by Harold H. Chase	Lieutenant Governor of Kansas; 1965–1969	Succeeded by James H. DeCoursey, Jr.
