= William H. Avery (politician) =

American politician (1911–2009)

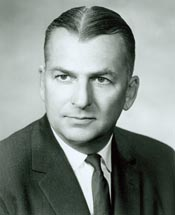

37th Governor of Kansas
- In office January 11, 1965 – January 9, 1967
- Lieutenant: John Crutcher
- Preceded by: John Anderson Jr.
- Succeeded by: Robert Docking

Member of the U.S. House of Representatives from Kansas
- In office January 3, 1955 – January 3, 1965
- Preceded by: Howard S. Miller
- Succeeded by: Chester L. Mize
- Constituency: 1st district (1955-1963); 2nd district (1963-1965)

Member of the Kansas House of Representatives
- In office 1951–1955

Personal details
- Born: William Henry Avery; August 11, 1911 Wakefield, Kansas, U.S.
- Died: November 4, 2009 (aged 98) Wakefield, Kansas, U.S.
- Party: Republican
- Spouse: Hazel Bowles (m. 1940–2004)
- Education: University of Kansas
- Profession: Farmer, Oilman, Banker, Politician

William Henry Avery (August 11, 1911 – November 4, 2009) was an American Republican Party politician who served as the 37th governor of Kansas from 1965 until 1967.

== Life and career ==
Born on August 11, 1911, near Wakefield, Kansas, Avery graduated from the University of Kansas in 1934. While attending KU, he joined Delta Upsilon fraternity. He was a member of the Wakefield School Board, and served in the Kansas House of Representatives from 1951 to 1955, and in the Congress for the Republican Party from 1955 to 1965.

Avery's parents were both college graduates; his father from Kansas State University and his mother from Emporia State University. Although very many school children did not attend school in that day, there was a strong push from both of Avery's parents to get an education. Although his family had a history with Kansas State, and it was the closest college – he declined the Wildcats and enrolled at the University of Kansas in Lawrence.

Avery "served as the state's thirty-seventh chief executive, from January 11, 1965, to January 9, 1967. Although his gubernatorial service was short, Avery's outgoing personality and ability to win elections made him a central figure in Kansas Republican Party politics throughout the 1950s and 1960s."

Avery is remembered as the governor who sanctioned the executions of Perry Smith and Richard Hickock, the murderers of the Clutter family, made notorious by the Truman Capote book In Cold Blood. Capote describes the governor as "a wealthy farmer" conscious of public opinion. Also as governor, he dedicated a memorial in Delphos, Kansas, for Abraham Lincoln and Grace Bedell, the eleven-year-old girl who suggested to presidential candidate Lincoln to grow his famous beard.

After losing the governorship to Robert Docking in the 1966 election, Avery attempted but failed to win a seat in the U.S. Senate, losing in the primary to future presidential candidate Bob Dole. Following his retirement from politics, he worked for Clinton Oil Company and became president of Real Petroleum Company. In 1990, Avery was elected to the Common Cause National Governing Board.

Avery was one of five former governors interviewed for the documentary The Kansas Governor, in which he proudly stated that in his many years of politics he had never played a round of golf. Avery was married to Hazel Bowles (January 4, 1914 – August 17, 2004) from 1940 until her death.

Avery died on November 4, 2009, at age 98. Flags in the state were ordered lowered until November 14 in his honor.

== Entrance into politics ==
William Avery's political career started on the Milford Reservoir. "I came right back from college and took over the farm. I evolved as kind of a spokesman for the lower part of the Republican Valley as opposing the reservoir and being in that group I became acquainted with a lot of people over at Tuttle Creek who were opposing Tuttle Creek [Dam]. So when it began to get heated up some, why I knew that group and we worked together rather effectively."

What that group was trying to do was stop the Dam from being built. There had been a flood in 1935 and people in the Tuttle Creek area were much more concerned about losing their houses and land opposed to a water shortage. Due to his work in Tuttle Creek, Avery was pushed to run for office in the state legislature. He believed that the local citizens believed they could have better representation, and Avery thought it was his job to fill that void. His opportunity came when citizens from Clay Center, Kansas sought him out to run for the Kansas House of Representatives. Avery said he would do it, as long as he did not have to go through a primary. "They gave a lot of reasons why they thought I should run. I said, "Okay, I'll make a deal. If you will guarantee I won't have a primary I'll probably consider to run, but I don't want to have to campaign at a primary and then possibly campaign in the general election." They came back in about a week and said, "We got it fixed; you won't have a primary."

Avery had the advantage of being a Republican running in one of the largest Republican counties in the state of Kansas. He was also a third generation farmer who had attended college and came back to take over the family farm. These two factors helped in his attempt at becoming a legislator. "Clay County is one of the strongest Republican counties in Kansas, I think number one, two, or three, so I didn't even have an opponent in the general election, and I didn't have an opponent when I ran for my second term."

Avery did have an opponent in his Clay County primary. He defeated prohibition candidate Ed Woellhof by 1983 votes to enter the Republican Party's 1954 primary. The incumbent of the first district was Democrat Howard Miller who had defeated incumbent Albert Cole. Cole had gotten some signs crossed with Avery in regards to the Milford Reservoir. "In the Blue Valley and Republican Valley action, he's opposed to Tuttle Creek and he's opposed to Milford, and that made him pretty solid in this area. Then after the 1942 flood that came along, why there was a lot of damage downstream, and that revived the downstream support for the reservoirs. I knew Albert and I didn't interrogate him very seriously on this, but he gave me the impression he voted against putting this money in for Milford and Tuttle Creek. But he didn't get up and oppose it."

This meant there would be a new representative from the First Congressional District of Kansas. For that man to be William Avery, he had to win the primary. Avery's biggest competition in the primary was Doral Hawks, a Republican who had a strong hold on Topeka. The First Congressional District of Kansas consists of 13 counties which also encompass Shawnee County; which is the county Topeka is located in. After the floods of 1935 and 1942 caused much damage to the city of Topeka, many citizens wanted the reservoirs built to help protect the city. Hawks was running under the platform of creating the reservoirs – an issue that seemed to impact the voting significantly. "The Republican Party's 1954 primary, a five-way contest for what was then the Kansas First Congressional District, was quite close. Avery won a plurality with 40 percent of the votes cast (22,077), and Hawks came in second, receiving almost 37 percent (19,952)."

Now, William Avery was up against the incumbent. Howard Miller had been receiving much credit for accomplishments that he had not actually achieved. "These Blue Valley Belles got a lot of publicity by campaigning for Howard Miller, saying he stopped Tuttle Creek. He didn't, Dwight Eisenhower took it out of the budget, that's what stopped it. He got the credit and was there and opposed it and Albert lost it."

It did not matter; Avery defeated Miller and became the Representative to the First Congressional District of Kansas in 1955. Many of the Republican members in the United States House of Representatives were inexperienced, which allowed Avery to climb up the ranks quickly. In just his second term, William Avery was able to work in the Interstate and Foreign Commerce Committee and the Rules Committee. Avery believed that he was seen more as a vote than a member, in regards to many of the older Congressmen. "They all said nice things and said they were glad I was there and that gave the Republicans one nearer to the majority than it was before. I don't know whether my physical presence meant much to them but my being there meant something to them." Avery voted in favor of the Civil Rights Acts of 1957, 1960, and 1964, as well as the 24th Amendment to the U.S. Constitution.

Eisenhower had taken the Milford Reservoir out of the budget. Now, President Harry Truman had re-appropriated budget money to the project. Avery felt it was his obligation to get this taken out of the budget. He wrote and elegant speech and delivered it to Congress; to no avail. "Cliff Hope was the only congressman from Kansas that voted with me. The other four – Errett P. Scrivner, Edward H. Rees, Wint Smith, and Myron V. George – all voted for the reservoir. I was kind of mad at the time."

== Running for Governor ==
Representative William Avery was ready to run for the Governorship in 1965. In an early campaign speech, Avery told Kansas what he wanted to be as their Governor. "I want to be the number one salesman for Kansas." I tied that to, "A job for every young lady and young man graduating from our Kansas schools."

Avery also backed a plan that would give statutory state aid to elementary and secondary schools. "The state aid has been a lifesaver for them because they were strictly relying on an ad valorem tax and they had about reached their limit on that. Now they are providing an educational opportunity for lots of students that never would have had a chance to go to an institution of higher learning. I say that the principal decision I made [as governor] was state aid to education."

Not only had Avery helped state aid to elementary and secondary schools, but also helped establish new help for community colleges. The "war babies" were coming to the age where they would be attending college, many were worried if there would be enough resources to accommodate these students. Avery met with Kansas State University President Jim McCain to discuss the topic. McCain said, "Bill [Avery], we need state support for junior colleges. The war babies, they are just hitting the college level now. We're out of space, we're out of teachers. And some of these students are coming here before they are ready for a four-year college. And instead of opposing that I think you should support junior colleges so they can prepare some of these students for leaving home and adjusting to the curriculum that we have on the collegiate level in Kansas."

Avery was very proud of what his reform did, and how it has weathered the test of time. Avery said, "They didn't repeal any of them. They didn't repeal the withholding tax and didn't repeal the increase in the sales tax. That provided the support for the education programs. Even though none where repealed, that did not change public sentiment towards the raising of their taxes."

== Bid for reelection ==
Governor William Avery's bid for reelection took place in 1966. Avery was the Republican incumbent to the Governorship and was seeking reelection during a time when he had raised taxes, a big no-no to the Kansas citizens.

His opponent was Democrat Robert Docking. Seeing as Avery's tax hike was controversial, Docking ran on a tax reduction platform. Docking's running strategy focused less on what his policies were, and more on the unpopular policies of Avery. During the summer before the election, Avery's approval rating was 46%.

Towards the end of his campaign, Avery began coming up with gimmicks for reelection. "At the end of the campaign the incumbent governor was looking for anything to help, including doing two hours of "Ask Avery" TV five days before the election, where he took questions from viewers across the state."

Avery lost his bid for reelection, 380,030 to 304,325. There were many reasons Avery believed he lost the election. "On election night Avery blamed the tax issues for his loss, but also noted that voters were frustrated over national problems such as inflation, rising crime rates, the Vietnam War, and student protests. Avery also believed that Kansans continued to be frustrated by school district unification which occurred during Governor John Anderson's term, but which Avery believed had a strong negative lingering effect on him."

== Legacy ==
At the time of his death, he was the second oldest living governor of any state behind Albert Rosellini of Washington and was the oldest living former U.S. Representative following the September 25, 2008, death of Glenn Andrews of Alabama. Avery's death left former New York Representative William F. Walsh as the oldest living former House member.

== See also ==
- List of Delta Upsilon alumni

U.S. House of Representatives
Preceded by Howard S. Miller	Member of the U.S. House of Representatives from Kansas's 1st congressional district January 3, 1955 – January 3, 1963	Succeeded by Bob Dole
Preceded by Robert Ellsworth	Member of the U.S. House of Representatives from Kansas's 2nd congressional district January 3, 1963 – January 3, 1965	Succeeded by Chester L. Mize
Party political offices
Preceded by John Anderson Jr.	Republican nominee for Governor of Kansas; 1964, 1966	Succeeded by Rick Harman
Political offices
Preceded by John Anderson Jr.	Governor of Kansas; January 11, 1965 – January 9, 1967	Succeeded by Robert Docking
Honorary titles
Preceded by Glenn Andrews	Oldest living United States representative (Sitting or former); September 25, 2008 – November 4, 2009	Succeeded by William F. Walsh
