= 1966 Kansas gubernatorial election =

- November 8, 1966
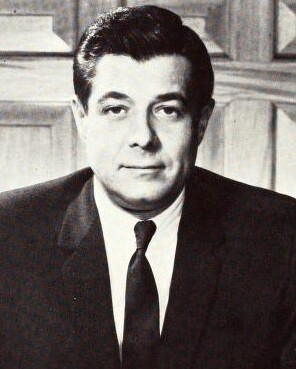

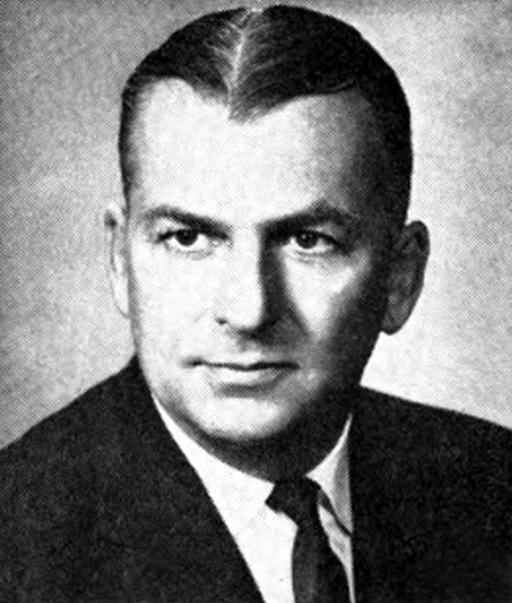
Nominee	Robert Docking	William H. Avery
Party	Democratic	Republican
Popular vote	380,030	304,325
Percentage	54.84%	43.92%
- County results Docking: 40–50% 50–60% 60–70% Avery: 40–50% 50–60% 60–70%
Governor before election
William H. Avery
Republican
Elected Governor
Robert Docking
Democratic

The 1966 Kansas gubernatorial election was held on November 8, 1966. The election pitted Democrat Robert Docking against incumbent Republican William H. Avery. On the campaign trail, Docking attacked Avery for his administration's unpopular income and sales tax hikes. Avery was also hurt by a contentious court ordered school district unification process that took place during his term. Avery had trailed in polling before the election, but was still seen as the favorite due to Kansas's strong Republican tradition and the intense unpopularity of the Johnson administration in the state. Despite this, Docking defeated Avery 55% to 44%

== Primary elections ==
Primary elections were held on August 2, 1966.

=== Democratic primary ===
==== Candidates ====
- Robert Docking, Mayor of Arkansas City
- George Hart, former Kansas State Treasurer

==== Results ====
Democratic primary results
Party	Candidate	Votes	%
Democratic	Robert Docking	96,414	85.47
Democratic	George Hart	16,385	14.53
Total votes		112,799	100.00

=== Republican primary ===
==== Candidates ====
- William H. Avery, incumbent Governor
- Dell Crozier

==== Results ====
Republican primary results
Party	Candidate	Votes	%
Republican	William H. Avery (incumbent)	144,842	75.09
Republican	Dell Crozier	48,051	24.91
Total votes		192,893	100.00

== General election ==
=== Candidates ===
Major party candidates

- Robert Docking, Democratic
- William H. Avery, Republican

Other candidates

- Rolland Ernest Fisher, Prohibition
- Carson Crawford, Independent

=== Results ===
1966 Kansas gubernatorial election
Party	Candidate	Votes	%	±%
Democratic	Robert Docking	380,030	54.84%	
Republican	William H. Avery (incumbent)	304,325	43.92%	
Prohibition	Rolland Ernest Fisher	4,742	0.68%	
Independent	Carson Crawford	3,858	0.56%	
Majority		75,705		
Turnout		692,955		
Democratic gain from Republican		Swing		
