= Robert Frederick Bennett =

American politician and 39th Governor of Kansas

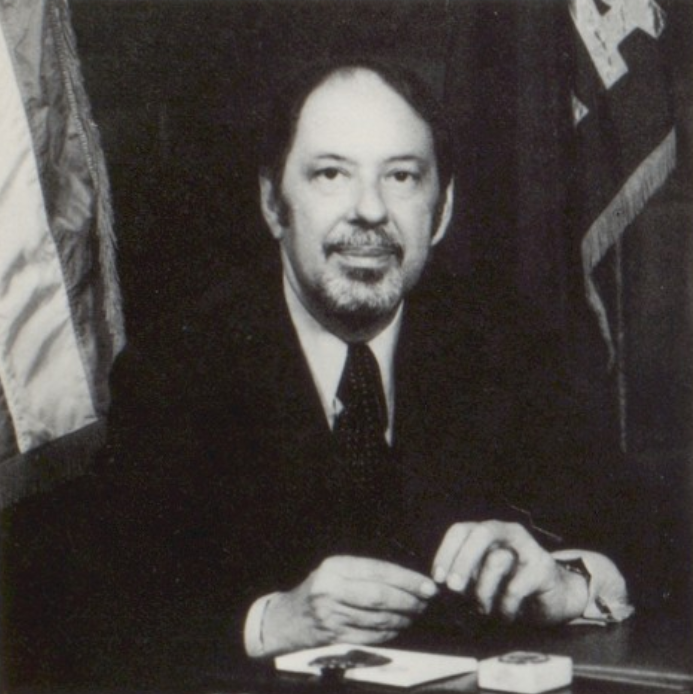

39th Governor of Kansas
- In office January 13, 1975 – January 8, 1979
- Lieutenant: Shelby Smith
- Preceded by: Robert Docking
- Succeeded by: John W. Carlin

President of the Kansas Senate
- Succeeded by: Richard Dean Rogers

Personal details
- Born: May 23, 1927 Kansas City, Missouri, U.S.
- Died: October 9, 2000 (aged 73) Kansas City, Missouri, U.S.
- Resting place: Corinth Cemetery; Prairie Village, Kansas
- Party: Republican
- Spouse(s): Mildred Gregory; Oliva Fisher
- Education: University of Kansas (BA, LLB)

Military service
- Allegiance: United States
- Branch/service: United States Marine Corps
- Battles/wars: World War II; Korean War
- Awards: Purple Heart

Robert Frederick Bennett (May 23, 1927 – October 9, 2000) was an American lawyer and the 39th governor of Kansas from 1975 to 1979.

== Biography ==
Bennett was born May 23, 1927, in Kansas City, Missouri. He married Joan Gregory, whom he met at Shawnee Mission Rural High School while participating in debate. They had four children: Robert F. (junior), Virginia L., Kathleen, and Patricia. He earned a B.A. in 1950 and a law degree in 1952 from the University of Kansas. He married a second time in 1971 to Olivia Fisher.

== Career ==
Bennett served in the U.S. Marine Corps in China during World War II and he also served in the U. S. Marines again during the Korean War, was wounded and received a Purple Heart.

In 1952, Bennett began his own law firm with Robert Lytle. The firm continued for more than 40 years until it merged with Lathrop & Gage in the mid-1990s. He was a council member from 1955 to 1957 in Prairie Village. From 1957 to 1965, Bennett served as mayor of Prairie Village, Kansas (a suburb of Kansas City).

A member of the Kansas State Senate from 1965 to 1975, Bennett was known for his classic cowboy boots, cowboy hat, and beard. He was an eloquent speaker and would often send reporters scrambling for dictionaries. He was president of the state senate when he was elected to the governorship in 1974. This was the first election that candidates for governor and lieutenant governor ran as a team as well as for a four-year term rather than a two-year term. During his tenure, he reformed operations in the governor's office to make heads of state agencies more responsible to the governor. In 1978, he lost his re-election bid to John W. Carlin and returned to his own practice and home.

From 1982 to 1983, Bennett served as chair of the Kansas Republican Party.

== Death ==
Bennett died October 9, 2000, of lung cancer at the St. Joseph's Medical Center in Kansas City and was buried in Corinth Cemetery in Prairie Village, Kansas. An avid hunter and fisherman, he was also a member of the American Bar Association, the American Judicature Society, the Freemasons, and the Optimist Club.

Party political offices
Preceded by Morris Kay	Republican nominee Governor of Kansas; 1974, 1978	Succeeded by Sam Hardage
Preceded by Arch Moore	Chair of the Republican Governors Association; 1976–1977	Succeeded by Robert D. Ray
Political offices
Preceded by Robert Docking	Governor of Kansas; 1975–1979	Succeeded by John W. Carlin
Preceded by William Dearth	Member of the Kansas State Senate from the 9th district 1973–1974	Succeeded by Bud Burke
Preceded by	Member of the Kansas State Senate from the 5th district 1969–1972	Succeeded by Bill Mulich
Preceded by	Member of the Kansas State Senate from the 15th district 1965–1968	Succeeded by Richard Dean Rogers
