= Robert Docking =

American politician

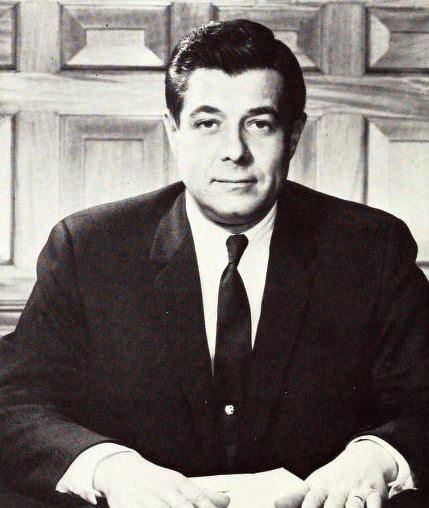

38th Governor of Kansas
- In office January 9, 1967 – January 13, 1975
- Lieutenant: John Crutcher; James H. DeCoursey, Jr. Reynolds Schultz; Dave Owen
- Preceded by: William H. Avery
- Succeeded by: Robert F. Bennett

Mayor of Arkansas City, Kansas
- In office 1963–1966

Personal details
- Born: Robert Blackwell Docking; October 9, 1925 Kansas City, Missouri, U.S.
- Died: October 8, 1983 (aged 57) Merriam, Kansas, U.S.
- Resting place: Highland Park Cemetery; Kansas City, Kansas
- Party: Democratic
- Spouse: Meredith Marina Gear
- Children: William, Tom
- Parent: George Docking
- Education: University of Kansas
- Profession: Banker, Oilman, Politician

Military service
- Allegiance: United States
- Branch/service: United States Army
- Unit: Reserves
- Battles/wars: World War II

Robert Blackwell Docking (October 9, 1925 – October 8, 1983) was an American businessman and politician from Kansas who served as the 38th governor of Kansas from 1967 until 1975. A conservative Democrat in a heavily Republican state, Docking is to date Kansas's only governor to serve four terms.

A son of previous Democratic governor George Docking, he grew up in Lawrence, Kansas, and served in the United States Army Air Forces during World War II. After the war he established a career as a banker and civic leader in Arkansas City, Kansas, eventually becoming mayor. Docking became the first Democrat in state history to unseat an incumbent governor in 1966, and would be reelected in 1968, 1970, and 1972.

A popular figure who was best known for his staunch fiscal conservatism and consistent electoral success, Docking is credited with reviving the Kansas Democratic Party and developing a competitive two-party system in Kansas. He was the father of Lieutenant Governor of Kansas and gubernatorial candidate Thomas Docking, and father-in-law of United States Senate candidate Jill Docking.

== Early life ==
The son of future Governor George Docking and Mary Virginia Blackwell Docking, Robert Blackwell Docking was born on October 9, 1925, in Kansas City, Missouri. He attended public school in Lawrence, Kansas, before attending the University of Kansas, and served in the United States Army Air Forces during World War II.

== Career ==
=== Early career ===
After his discharge from the military, Docking returned to Lawrence to take a position at First National Bank of Lawrence, his family's banking business. He married Elkhart, Kansas native and University of Kansas business graduate Meredith Marina Gear on June 17, 1950 in Kansas City, Missouri.

In 1956, Docking moved to Arkansas City, Kansas to take a position as vice president of Union State Bank. In 1959 he became president of the bank. Also in 1959, he was named "Young Man of the Year" by the Kansas State Junior Chamber of Commerce. Docking also became involved in an insurance agency and a feedlot business.

=== Elections ===
Docking was elected governor in 1966 in a major upset over the incumbent Republican, William Avery 55% to 44%, whom Docking attacked for his administration's unpopular income and sales tax hikes. Avery was also hurt by a contentious court-ordered school district unification process that took place during his term. Avery had trailed in polling before the election, but was still seen as the favorite due to Kansas's strong Republican tradition and the intense unpopularity of the Johnson Administration in the state. Docking was narrowly reelected to a second term in 1968, defeating Republican Rick Harman 52% to 48%. He was re-elected to a third term in 1970, defeating Republican Kent Frizzell 54% to 45%. In 1972, despite the victory of President Richard Nixon in the state, Docking was re-elected to a fourth term, defeating Republican Morris Kay 62% to 37%. Due to a new amendment in the state constitution, Docking was ineligible for reelection in 1974 and was succeeded by Republican Robert Frederick Bennett.

=== Tenure ===
The 1967 legislative session was dominated by bitter clashes between Docking and a largely Republican legislature on taxes, school finance and highway construction. Accomplishments of the session were considered modest, but the governor fulfilled a campaign promise by securing approval of a cut of income taxes on the first $2,000 of taxable income from 2.5% to 2%. He also established conformity between federal and state income taxes, and reduced withholding rates form 15% to 10%. He ultimately vetoed 21 bills passed during the session.

Docking served more terms than any other Kansas governor, but is tied for length of service because of a constitutional amendment approved during his final term which provided that Kansas governors serve four-year terms, and are constitutionally prohibited from running for more than two terms. He was known for his commitment to farmers, small business owners, and the environment.

Docking was married to the former Meredith Gear. They had two sons, William and Tom, the latter of whom served as lieutenant governor and ran unsuccessfully for the governorship in 1986.

After his service as governor, Docking resumed his former profession of banking in Arkansas City. He donated his papers to the University of Kansas rather than give them to the Kansas State Historical Society, where the papers of his 34 predecessors are stored, with the exception of his father, who burned his gubernatorial papers.

== Death and legacy ==
Docking died of emphysema in 1983 in Merriam, Kansas, the day before his 58th birthday, and is interred in Highland Park Cemetery in Kansas City, Kansas, in a plot adjoining his parents'.

A state office building across the street from the capital in Topeka, Kansas, bears his name, and his bank in Arkansas City (Union State Bank), which is still owned by the Dockings, is on the National Register of Historic Places. In addition, the entire length of U.S. Route 77 in Cowley County, Kansas (which contains Arkansas City) is known as the Robert B. Docking Memorial Highway.

Docking's son Thomas was lieutenant governor of Kansas during the gubernatorial tenure of John Carlin.

Docking's daughter-in-law, and Thomas' wife, Jill Docking, was the unsuccessful Democratic nominee to succeed Bob Dole in the 1996 U.S. Senate election, losing to Sam Brownback. She was the Democratic nominee for lieutenant governor in the 2014 elections (Paul Davis was the gubernatorial candidate and her running mate).

Party political offices
Preceded by Harry G. Wiles	Democratic nominee for Governor of Kansas; 1966, 1968, 1970, 1972	Succeeded by Vern Miller
Political offices
Preceded by William H. Avery	Governor of Kansas; 1967-1975	Succeeded by Robert F. Bennett
