= 2002 Kansas Attorney General election =

- November 5, 2002
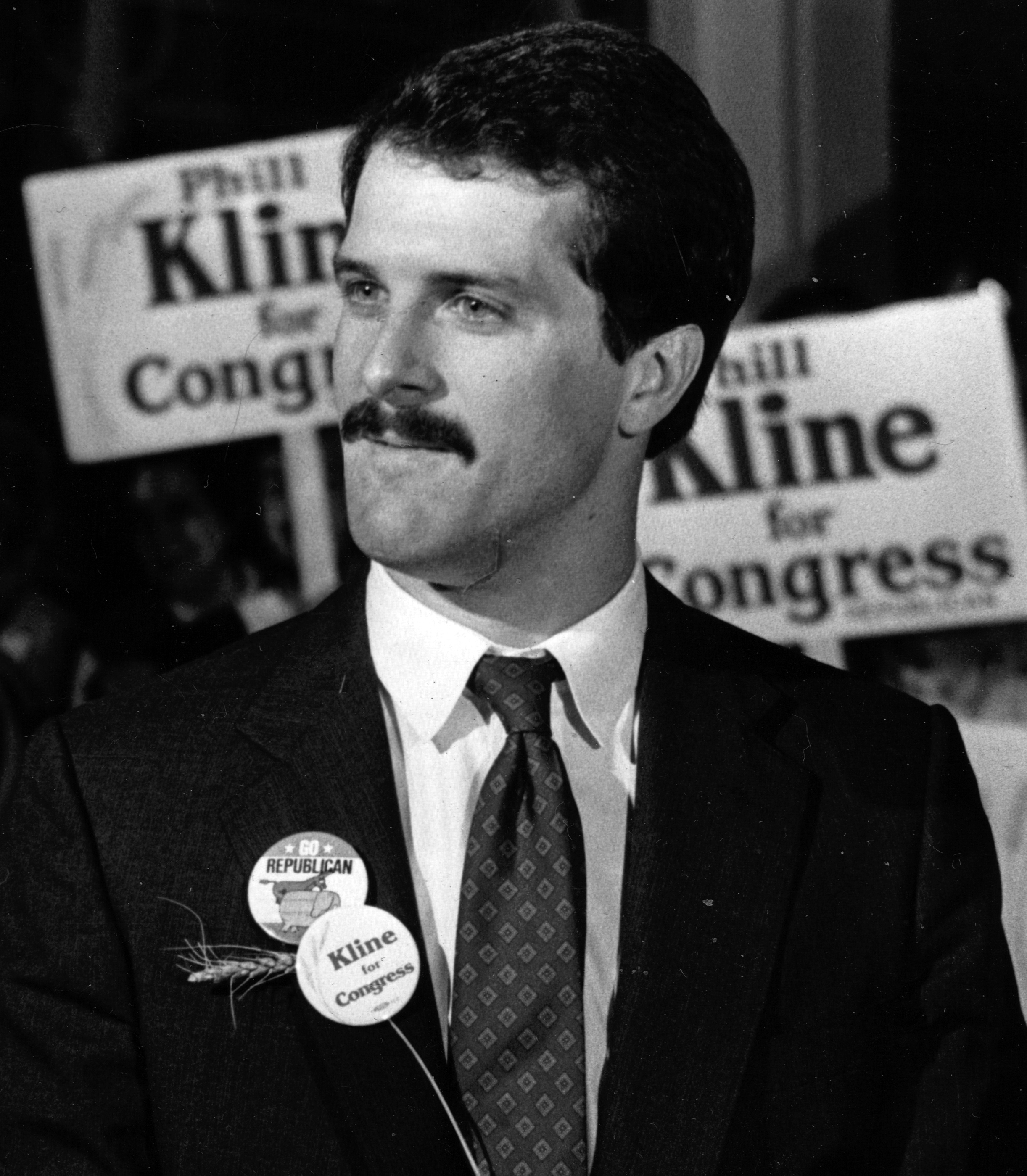

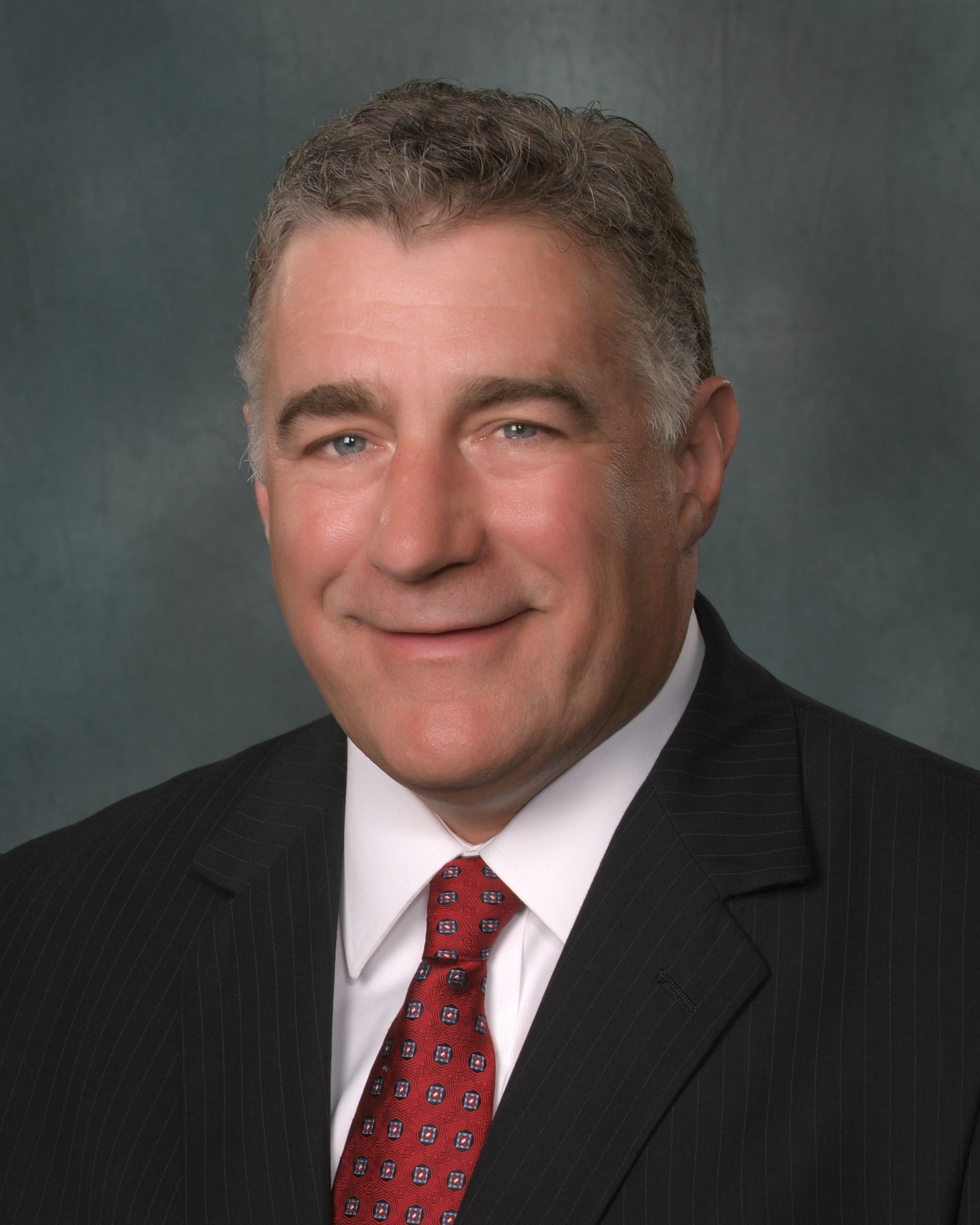
Nominee	Phill Kline	Chris Biggs
Party	Republican	Democratic
Popular vote	412,697	408,410
Percentage	50.26%	49.74%
- County results Kline: 50–60% 60–70% 70–80% Biggs: 50–60% 60–70% 70–80%
Attorney General before election
Carla Stovall
Republican
Elected Attorney General
Phill Kline
Republican

The 2002 Kansas Attorney General election was held on November 5, 2002, to elect the Kansas Attorney General. Incumbent Republican Carla Stovall chose not to run for a third term, instead running for the Republican nomination for Governor of Kansas and later dropping out. Republican former Kansas state representative Phill Kline won the election, defeating Democratic attorney Chris Biggs by a narrow margin of just 0.52 percentage points.

== Republican primary ==
=== Candidates ===
- Phill Kline, former Kansas state representative (1993–2001)
- David Adkins, Kansas state senator (2001–2005)
- Charles D. McAtee, attorney

=== Results ===
Republican primary results
Party	Candidate	Votes	%
Republican	Phill Kline	142,333	49.71%
Republican	David Adkins	111,133	38.81%
Republican	Charles D. McAtee	32,877	11.48%
Total votes		286,343	100.00%

== Democratic primary ==
=== Candidates ===
- Chris Biggs, attorney

=== Results ===
Democratic primary results
Party	Candidate	Votes	%
Democratic	Chris Biggs	71,394	100.00%
Total votes		71,394	100.00%

== General election ==
=== Candidates ===
- Phill Kline, former Kansas state representative (1993–2001) (Republican)
- Chris Biggs, attorney (Democratic)

=== Results ===
2002 Kansas Attorney General election results
Party	Candidate	Votes	%	±%
Republican	Phill Kline	412,697	50.26%	−24.84%
Democratic	Chris Biggs	408,410	49.74%	+24.84%
Total votes		821,107	100.00%	
Republican hold				
