= 2010 Kansas Attorney General election =

- November 2, 2010
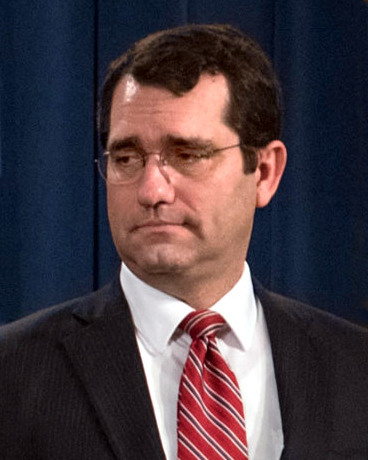

Nominee	Derek Schmidt	Stephen Six
Party	Republican	Democratic
Popular vote	460,737	349,340
Percentage	55.20%	41.85%
- County results Schmidt: 40–50% 50–60% 60–70% 70–80% 80–90% Six: 50–60% 60–70%
Attorney General before election
Stephen Six
Democratic
Elected Attorney General
Derek Schmidt
Republican

The 2010 Kansas Attorney General election was held on November 2, 2010, to elect the Kansas Attorney General. Democratic incumbent Stephen Six, who was appointed in 2008 following Paul J. Morrison's resignation, ran for election to a full term but was defeated by Republican Kansas Senate Majority Leader Derek Schmidt by a margin of thirteen percentage points.

== Democratic primary ==
=== Candidates ===
- Stephen Six, incumbent Kansas Attorney General (2008–2011)

=== Results ===
Democratic primary results
Party	Candidate	Votes	%
Democratic	Stephen Six	74,975	100.00%
Total votes		74,975	100.00%

== Republican primary ==
=== Candidates ===
- Derek Schmidt, Kansas state senator (2001–2011) and Kansas Senate Majority Leader (2005–2011)
- Ralph J. De Zago, former Assistant Kansas Attorney General

=== Results ===
Republican primary results
Party	Candidate	Votes	%
Republican	Derek Schmidt	208,611	76.39%
Republican	Ralph J. De Zago	64,493	23.61%
Total votes		273,104	100.00%

== General election ==
=== Candidates ===
- Derek Schmidt, Kansas state senator (2001–2011) and Kansas Senate Majority Leader (2005–2011) (Republican)
- Stephen Six, incumbent Kansas Attorney General (2008–2011) (Democratic)
- Dennis Hawver, attorney (Libertarian)

=== Results ===
2010 Kansas Attorney General election results
Party	Candidate	Votes	%	±%
Republican	Derek Schmidt	460,737	55.20%	+13.71%
Democratic	Stephen Six	349,340	41.85%	−16.66%
Libertarian	Dennis Hawver	24,627	2.95%	N/A
Total votes		834,704	100.00%	
Republican gain from Democratic				
