= Burlingame =

Burlingame may refer to:

== People ==
- Alvah W. Burlingame Jr. (1879–1952), New York politician
- Anson Burlingame, 19th-century American diplomat; a US–China treaty was named after him, along with towns in California and Kansas
- Charles Burlingame, the pilot of American Airlines Flight 77 before it was hijacked and flown into the Pentagon on 9/11
- Creed Burlingame, United States Navy submarine commander during World War II
- Debra Burlingame, sister of Charles Burlingame and World Trade Center Memorial Foundation board member
- Emeline S. Burlingame (1836–1923; pen name, "Aunt Stomly"), American editor, evangelist, suffragist
- Frank Burlingame, American professional baseball umpire
- Hardin Jasper Burlingame (1852–1915), American magician and magic historian
- Jeff Burlingame, American author and editor
- Merrill G. Burlingame (1901–1994), Professor of History, Montana State University

== Places ==
- Burlingame, California, United States
  - Burlingame High School (California)
  - Burlingame station on the Caltrain railway line
- Burlingame, San Diego, a neighborhood of San Diego, California
- Burlingame, Kansas, United States
  - Burlingame High School (Kansas)
- Burlingame State Park, Rhode Island, United States
- Burlingame, Portland, Oregon, a neighborhood

== Other ==
- Burlingame Treaty, an 1868 treaty between the United States and China
