= Derek Schmidt =

American politician (born 1968)

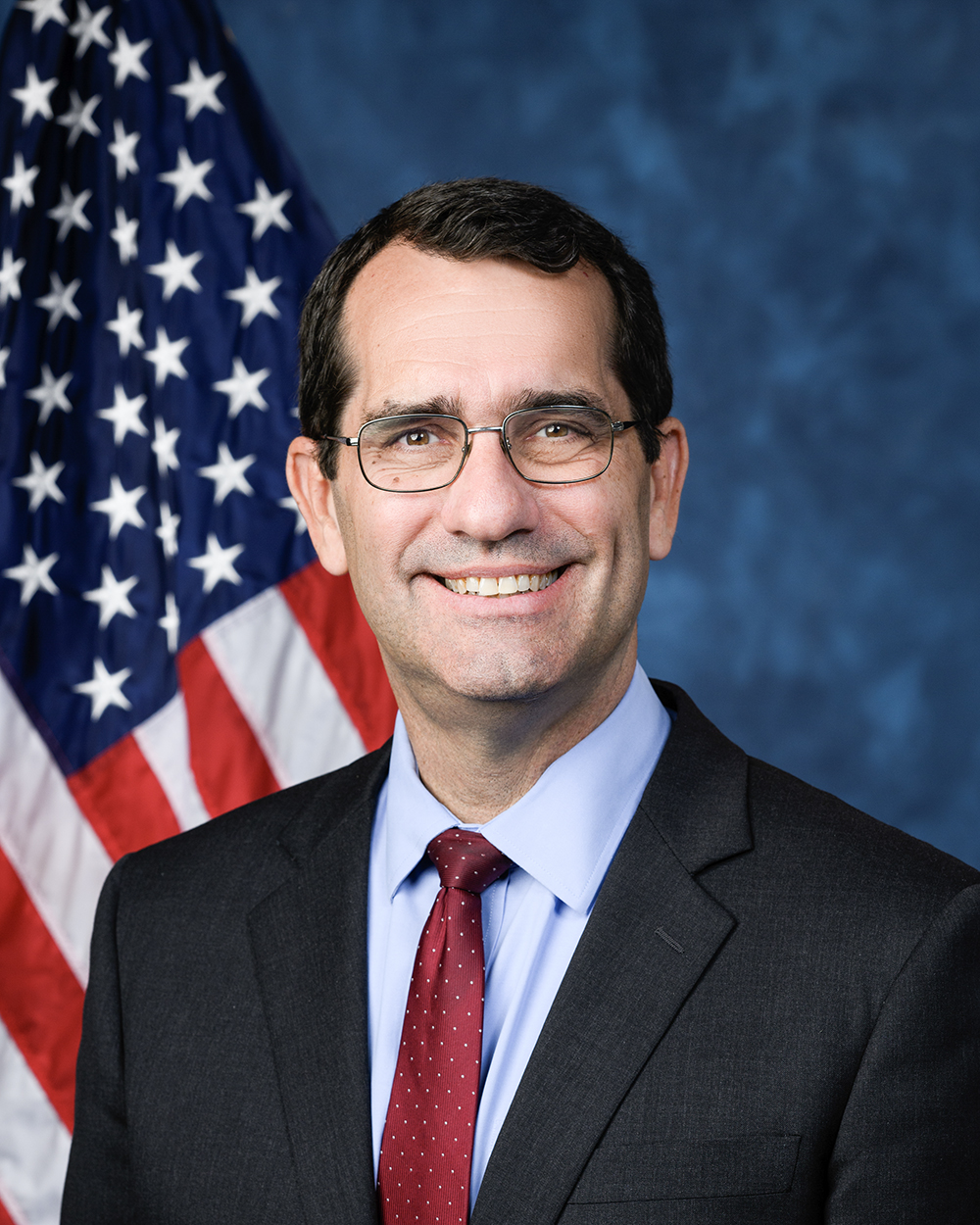
- Official portrait, 2024

Member of the U.S. House of Representatives from Kansas's 2nd district
- Incumbent
- Assumed office January 3, 2025
- Preceded by: Jake LaTurner

44th Attorney General of Kansas
- In office January 10, 2011 – January 9, 2023
- Governor: Sam Brownback; Jeff Colyer; Laura Kelly
- Preceded by: Stephen Six
- Succeeded by: Kris Kobach

Majority Leader of the Kansas Senate
- In office January 10, 2005 – January 10, 2011
- Preceded by: Lana Oleen
- Succeeded by: Jay Emler

Member of the Kansas Senate from the 15th district
- In office January 8, 2001 – January 10, 2011
- Preceded by: Tim Emert
- Succeeded by: Jeff King

Personal details
- Born: Derek Larkin Schmidt; January 23, 1968 (age 58) Independence, Kansas, U.S.
- Party: Republican
- Spouse: Jennifer Schmidt
- Children: 2
- Education: University of Kansas (BA); University of Leicester (MA); Georgetown University (JD); University of Kansas (SJD)
- Website: House website

Derek Larkin Schmidt (born January 23, 1968) is an American lawyer and politician serving as the U.S. representative for Kansas's 2nd congressional district since 2025. He previously served as the Kansas Attorney General from 2011 to 2023. A Republican, Schmidt was first elected to office serving in the Kansas Senate, where he represented the 15th district from 2001 to 2011, and served as Agriculture Committee chairman and Senate majority leader. Schmidt became the state attorney general in 2011, after he defeated incumbent Democrat Stephen Six.

Schmidt was the Republican nominee for governor of Kansas in the 2022 election, but narrowly lost to incumbent Democrat Laura Kelly.

== Early life and career ==
Schmidt graduated from the University of Kansas with a Bachelor of Arts in 1990, received a Master of Arts in international politics from the University of Leicester in England, a Juris Doctor degree from the Georgetown University Law Center, and a Doctor of Juridical Science from the University of Kansas. Schmidt was then a legislative assistant to Republican U.S. Senator Nancy Kassebaum of Kansas, an assistant Kansas attorney general and special counsel to Governor Bill Graves.

== Kansas State Senate ==
Schmidt was elected to the Kansas Senate in 2000. In 2004, Schmidt was elected the Senate majority leader, holding this post through 2010.

During his time in the Kansas Senate, Schmidt sponsored an unsuccessful proposal to repeal the state's ban on for-profit prisons. Schmidt was a supporter of the highly popular Kansas version of Jessica's Law, but "almost single-handedly killed the final bill by demanding inclusion of a provision allowing private prisons in Kansas" as the town of Yates Center, in Schmidt's district, sought to bring a private prison to the town.

According to OpenSecrets, top contributors to Schmidt's campaigns included the Community Bankers Association, AT&T, the Kansas Association of Realtors, the Kansas Optometric Association, Cox Enterprises, Koch Industries, Monsanto, the Kansas Wine & Spirits Wholesalers Association, the Associated General Contractors of Kansas, Sunflower Electric Power Corporation, and Sprint.

== Attorney General of Kansas (2011-2023) ==
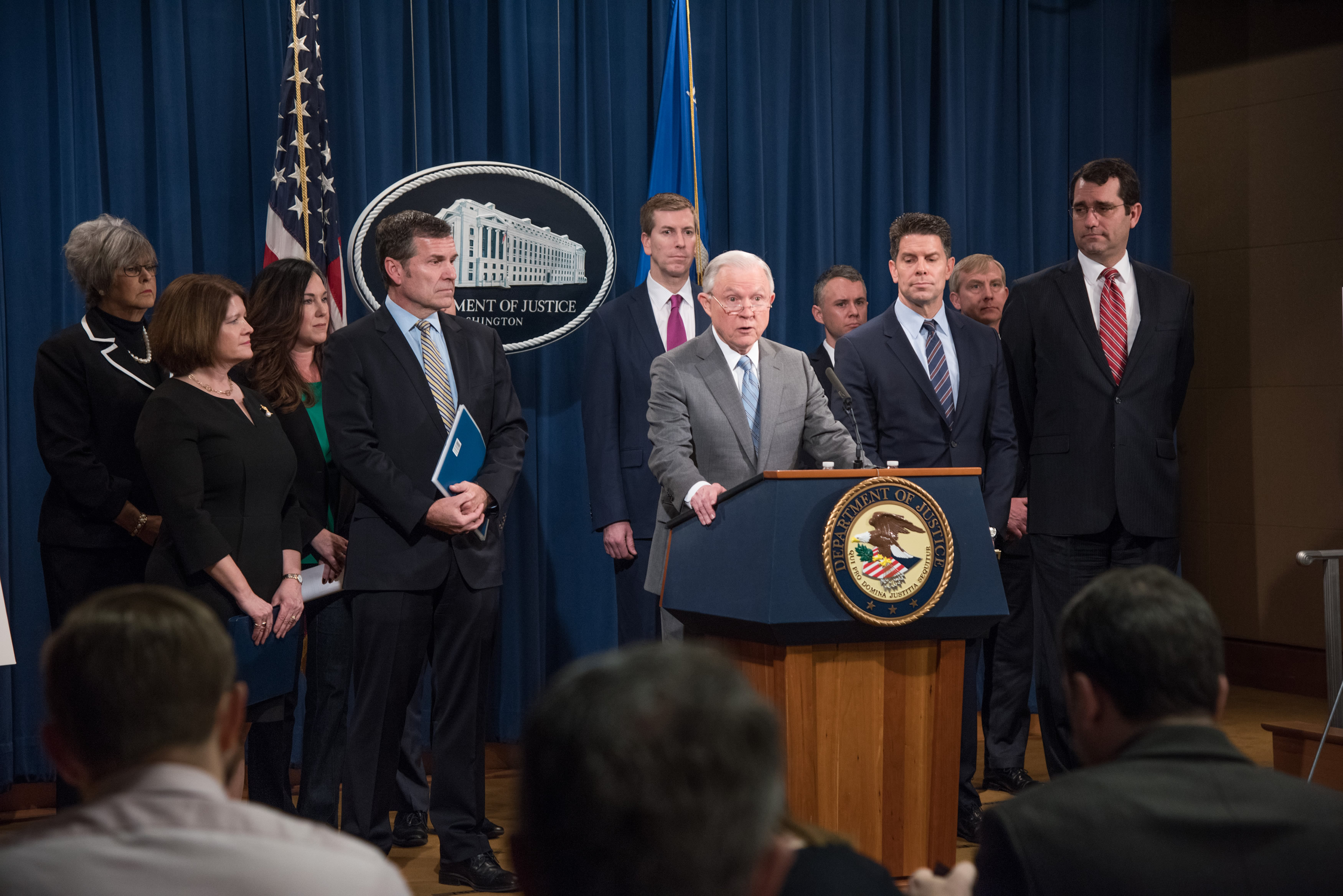
Schmidt (far right) at a press conference with Attorney General Jeff Sessions in 2018

=== Elections ===
Schmidt was the Republican nominee for Kansas Attorney General, defeating Ralph DeZago in the Republican primary election on August 3, 2010. He won the general election against the incumbent, Democrat Steve Six by a comfortable margin and took office on January 10, 2011. A key issue in Schmidt's first campaign for attorney general was the Affordable Care Act (ACA), the health care reform law. Six chose not to join 25 other states in challenging the constitutionality of the ACA, while Schmidt pledged to join the lawsuit challenging the law, if elected.

Schmidt won re-election in 2014, defeating Democratic nominee A.J. Kotich, a labor lawyer and former chief attorney for the Kansas Department of Labor.

In 2018, Schmidt defeated Democratic nominee Sarah G. Swain, winning election to a third term.

=== Coronavirus response ===
In April 2020, Democratic governor Laura Kelly instituted orders to restrict the rapid spread of COVID-19 that limited public gatherings to a maximum of ten persons. As this would have applied to Easter Sunday celebrations in churches, the Republican-majority Legislative Coordinating Council reversed her order. Republican Schmidt also opposed Kelly's order, contending that it violated the Kansas Constitution and Kansas law. He issued a memo calling the order likely unconstitutional and urged law enforcement not to enforce it. Of the first eleven loci of contagion in Kansas, three had already been traced to religious gatherings. The Kansas Supreme Court reinstated Kelly's orders on April 11, in expedited proceedings. A week later, in a separate case, U.S. District Judge John W. Broomes in Wichita issued a temporary restraining order blocking enforcement of Kelly's order as to two churches (one in Junction City, the other in Dodge City), where the plaintiffs contended that the restriction violated religious freedom and free speech rights. That case became moot after Governor Kelly issued a new executive order with less restrictive COVID-19 rules effective on May 4, 2020, under an agreement that allowed the churches to hold larger in-person services but required social distancing. Schmidt and Republican officials acted to countermand the governor's orders concerning wearing masks and social distancing. A study published in the Journal of the American Medical Association found that Kansas counties that had passed mask mandates experienced 500 fewer COVID-19 deaths than would have otherwise been expected in the absence of such restrictions.

=== Obama administration ===
==== Lawsuits challenging Obama administration policies ====
As attorney general, Schmidt joined with other Republican state attorneys general in challenging federal regulatory actions adopted by the Obama administration that Schmidt contended were illegal federal overreach. Schmidt and his colleagues were successful in blocking many of these regulations, particularly those proposed by the Environmental Protection Agency. Kansas challenged Obama-era regulations on the oil and gas industry, including a regulation controlling emissions of the greenhouse gas methane; in 2015, Schmidt also joined Kansas in a suit challenging the Obama administration's Clean Power Plan. In the latter case, the Supreme Court issued in 2016 a stay of implementation in a 5–4 decision along ideological lines.

One of Schmidt's first acts as state attorney general was to add Kansas as a plaintiff to the lawsuit challenging the constitutionality of Patient Protection and Affordable Care Act and Health Care and Education Reconciliation Act of 2010 in Florida v. United States Department of Health and Human Services; in a letter, Schmidt wrote that the ACA's individual mandate would "encroach on the sovereignty of the State of Kansas and on the rights of our citizens." The U.S. Supreme Court, in National Federation of Independent Business v. Sebelius (2012), ultimately upheld most of the ACA as constitutional, while striking down a portion of the law which would have required states to implement Medicaid expansion.

In July 2017, Schmidt joined a group of eight other Republican state attorneys general, led by Ken Paxton of Texas, as well as Idaho Governor Butch Otter, in sending a letter to President Donald Trump saying that they would litigate if Trump did not terminate the Deferred Action for Childhood Arrivals (DACA) policy that had been put into place by the Obama administration. (One of the signatories, Tennessee Attorney General Herbert H. Slatery III, subsequently reversed his position and urged passage of the DREAM Act.)

=== Same-sex marriage ===
Schmidt defended Kansas in a lawsuit brought by the ACLU, seeking to invalidate Kansas's ban on same-sex marriage and its prohibition of allowing same-sex couples to change the names on state drivers' licenses to reflect their married names, receive spousal health benefits, or file joint state tax returns. In 2014, after the chief district judge of Johnson County (the most populous county in the state) ordered the state to issue licenses to same-sex couples, Schmidt filed a petition in the Kansas Supreme Court and obtained a temporary halt to the issuance of licenses to same-sex couples pending a hearing. However, in November 2014, a federal district judge ordered the state to allow same-sex couples to marry. Schmidt petitioned the U.S. Supreme Court to block the order, but the Court denied his request. In 2015, after the U.S. Supreme Court ruled that same-sex couples have a constitutional right to marry, Schmidt dropped his Kansas Supreme Court case against same-sex marriage.

=== Planned Parenthood ===
In Planned Parenthood of Kansas and Mid-Missouri v. Andersen (2018), the U.S. Court of Appeals for the Tenth Circuit ruled in favor of Planned Parenthood, who challenged the decision of Kansas government officials to terminate Medicaid contracts with the organization. The court of appeals held that "States may not terminate providers from their Medicaid program for any reason they see fit, especially when that reason is unrelated to the provider's competence and the quality of the health care it provides." Schmidt strongly opposed the decision, as well as a similar one made by the Fifth Circuit in the Louisiana case of Gee v. Planned Parenthood of Gulf Coast. Schmidt asked the U.S. Supreme Court to reverse the Tenth Circuit's decision, but in December 2018, the Supreme Court denied his petition for a writ of certiorari. The state paid three East Coast law firms $899,000. One of the firms, Consovoy, McCarthy, Park, a Washington D.C. practice which was also representing President Trump in his efforts to prevent the release of his financial records, received $396,000 from Kansas. The firms were charging between $492 per hour to $750 an hour. Average billing rates for Kansas law firms handling such a case would have been $244 hourly.

=== Marijuana ===
In 2015, Schmidt asked the Kansas Supreme Court to strike down a ballot measure, approved by voters in Wichita, that created a city ordinance reducing marijuana possession enforcement in the city. The measure specifically reduced the penalty for persons over 21 charged with a first marijuana possession offense (moving it from a Class A criminal misdemeanor to a civil infraction carrying a $50 fine). Schmidt asserted that the voter imitative was barred because it conflicted with uniform state law, a claim that the city disputed. The Kansas Supreme Court struck down the city ordinance in 2016; the court did not address Schmidt's argument that the local law conflicted with state law, but rather based its decision on a technical error, ruling that the petitioners' filing of the proposed ordinance with the city clerk was improper.

In January 2018, Schmidt issued an opinion stating that all forms of marijuana, including cannabidiol (CBD oil) are unlawful in Kansas. Later in 2018, the state legislature voted to amend the state-law definition of marijuana to exclude CBD products without THC.

In 2019, Schmidt was one of 17 state attorneys general who did not sign onto a letter from 33 state attorneys general in support of U.S. Representative Ed Perlmutter's Secure and Fair Enforcement (SAFE) Banking Act (H.R. 1595), a bill to allow marijuana-related businesses in states and territories in which marijuana is legal to use the banking system. The bill would facilitate the collection of taxes levied on the $8.3 billion industry, reduce the danger of operating cash-only businesses and more effectively monitor the industry.

=== Election litigation ===
==== State Objections Board proceedings about Obama's birth certificate ====
Despite numerous judges across the U.S. having rejected challenges to the natural-born citizenship of Barack Obama, since before he was elected president in 2008, Kansas Secretary of State Kris Kobach persistently demanded proof of citizenship before allowing Obama's name to appear on the 2012 Kansas presidential ballot. In September 2012, while leading the three-person State Objections Board, and supported by its other members, Kansas Secretary of State Jeff Colyer and Schmidt, Kobach requested additional evidence that Obama was actually born in Hawaii. The three heard arguments on a claim from a Manhattan, Kansas resident, Joe Montgomery, who claimed that Obama was not eligible to be president because his father was from Kenya and questioned whether the president had a valid birth certificate. The Board asserted that it lacked sufficient evidence to determine whether Obama was eligible to appear on the Kansas ballot as a candidate in 2012 and that they needed to review Obama's birth certificate and other documents from Hawaii, Arizona, and Mississippi before they could respond to the resident's complaint. The challenge, backed by high-profile conspiracist Orly Taitz, was eventually dropped but showed the continuing presence of the "birther" movement. In an editorial, the Wichita Eagle criticized Kobach for entertaining conspiracy theories that "made Kansas look ridiculous" and criticized Colyer and Schmidt for failing to promptly toss the birther challenge.

==== 2014 U.S. Senate race ====
Schmidt joined forces with Republican Kris Kobach, then-Kansas Secretary of State, in filing a brief in support of a lawsuit seeking to force the Kansas Democratic Party to field a candidate in the 2014 U.S. Senate general election. If the Democrats were forced to field a candidate, it was anticipated to have decreased the chances of independent candidate Greg Orman (who was supported by Democrats) of defeating incumbent Republican Pat Roberts in the 2014 election. The suit was unanimously rejected by a three-judge panel of the Kansas District Court in Shawnee County.

==== State Objections Board proceedings about Michael Capps ====
Michael Capps filed to run in 2018 for the Kansas House District 97 seat using an address on the south side of Wichita. However, months before the election, Representative Chuck Weber, the incumbent in heavily Republican House District 85, that included part of north Wichita, and also suburbs to the north and northeast withdrew from his re-election run, and gave notice of his resignation, effective July 14, 2018. Then Capps changed his campaign filing, running instead for the District 85 seat, giving a north Wichita address, with a business mailing address of 6505 East Central Avenue, #110. Capps claimed he resided the Governeour street address, though the home was scheduled to be sold at auction on June 27, 2018. Democrats alleged Capps did not actually live at that address. However, the Kansas Objections Board, composed of Republicans Lieutenant Governor Tracey Mann, Kansas Secretary of State Kris Kobach and Schmidt, refused to uphold the complaint. The Sedgwick County Republican Central Committee appointed Capps to fill the remainder of Weber's 85th District term. When a Wichita Eagle reporter went to the home in the wake of October 2019 accusations about a fabricated attack video made by Capps against Wichita mayoral runoff candidate Brandon Whipple, an unidentified young man living there said he was "house sitting" and hadn't seen Capps, "in a while." Marc Bennett, District Attorney of Sedgwick County, petitioned to have Capps removed from office after an investigation of child abuse caused him to be decertified and removed as a Court Appointed Special Advocate. Schmidt answered that he did not possess the authority to remove Capps. as Kansas law limits removal of a state House member to four methods: Election defeat, expulsion by a vote of the Kansas House, expiration of the representative's term of office, or recall election. Schmidt noted state law forbids recall elections in the last two hundred days of a representative's term and since the legislature would not meet before the election, it could not expel Capps. In 2020, Capps lost the Republican primary to Patrick Penn, who received 74.4%, 3,349 votes.

==== Joining challenge to 2020 presidential election results ====
On December 8, 2020, Ken Paxton, the Republican Texas Attorney General, sued the states of Georgia, Michigan, Wisconsin, and Pennsylvania (four swing states won by Joe Biden, who defeated President Donald Trump) seeking to overturn the election results. Schmidt, as well as 15 other Republican state attorneys general, joined Texas's suit, Texas v. Pennsylvania, which was filed directly in the U.S. Supreme Court. The suit, supported by Trump and 120 Republican members of Congress, alleged unconstitutional actions in the four states' presidential ballot tallies and repeated claims of election fraud, that remained unsubstantiated, and which had already been rejected by other state and federal courts. In the suit, Paxton asked the Supreme Court to invalidate the states' sixty-two electoral votes, allowing Trump to be declared the winner of a second presidential term. Legal experts, as well as attorney generals from the four states, criticized the suit as meritless and politically motivated. The Supreme Court quickly rejected the suit in an unsigned opinion on December 11. The Wichita Eagle editorial board criticized Schmidt for having "signed our state's name to an embarrassing and baseless lawsuit aimed at overturning the presidential election" and noted that the amicus brief to which Schmidt signed "expanded voting rules in the four targeted states, even though Kansas employs many of the same procedures."

=== Biden administration ===
In March 2021, Schmidt joined 11 other Republican state attorneys general in a lawsuit against the Biden administration, challenging a January 2021 Biden executive order aimed at mitigating climate change and incentivizing green jobs. The order directed federal agencies to consider, in environmental rulemaking, the social cost (economic damages) caused by emissions of greenhouse gases (carbon, methane, and nitrous oxide); revoked the permit for the Keystone XL Pipeline; and temporarily prohibited drilling in the Arctic National Wildlife Refuge. Schmidt claimed that the order would be "job-killing" and alleged that Biden lacked the constitutional authority to implement new rules about greenhouse gases.

Schmidt also joined 20 other Republican state attorneys general in objecting to voting rights legislation passed by the U.S. House, alleging violations of the U.S. Constitution and an intrusion on states' rights to manage elections. The attorneys general vowed to challenge the bill in court, should it become law.

On June 17, in a 7–2 decision, the U.S. Supreme Court rejected an attack on Patient Protection and Affordable Care Act, ruling that the petitioners lacked standing. Schmidt had once again joined in an action brought by Texas Attorney General Ken Paxton.

=== Other ===
In 2016, Schmidt created a new Fraud and Abuse Litigation Division to prosecute financial crimes and elder abuse.

In 2017, Schmidt's colleagues elected him to serve a one-year term beginning in 2018 as president of the National Association of Attorneys General (NAAG), an office which rotates on a regional basis.

Schmidt hired Toby Crouse as the Kansas Solicitor General. Crouse left the office after being appointed by Trump to the Kansas federal district court.

Schmidt has given oral argument several times on behalf of the State of Kansas in the United States Supreme Court. Schmidt successfully argued two Supreme Court cases involving the death penalty: Kansas v. Cheever (argued and decided in 2013) and Kansas v. Carr (argued in 2015 and decided in 2016). Schmidt also gave oral argument in the Supreme Court case Kansas v. Garcia (argued 2019 and decided 2020), in which the Court held, 5–4, that the Immigration Reform and Control Act (IRCA) does not preempt "Kansas's application of its state identity-theft and fraud statutes to the noncitizens in this case."

== 2022 Kansas gubernatorial election ==
In March 2021, Schmidt became the first major Republican candidate to enter the race against incumbent Democrat Laura Kelly for governor of Kansas in the 2022 election cycle. Schmidt named former Kansas Republican Party Chairman Kelly Arnold as his campaign treasurer. A Schmidt-aligned political action committee, Our Way of Life PAC, launched the previous week and announced plans to spend money in a push to unite Republicans around Schmidt. One of Schmidt's opponents in the Republican primary election was former governor Jeff Colyer, but Colyer dropped out of the race for the nomination due to ill health in August 2021, and endorsed Schmidt.

Schmidt said he would "welcome" the support of former president Donald Trump in the race and said he felt Trump's agenda "was very good for Kansas." Schmidt was endorsed by Colyer and Trump, and also by former vice-president Mike Pence and former secretary of state Mike Pompeo. Several months before Bob Dole died in December 2021, he issued an endorsement of Schmidt for governor, jointly with his fellow former U.S. Senator Pat Roberts.

Schmidt did not receive the endorsement of three of his former Republican superiors: former governor Bill Graves, former United States Senator Nancy Kassebaum, and former Kansas Attorney General Carla Stovall. They all endorsed Kelly in the race, as Graves and Kassebaum had done four years earlier against a different Republican nominee. Kelly won the general election by 49.5% to 47.3%.

== U.S. House of Representatives ==
=== Elections ===
On April 26, 2024, Schmidt announced that he would run for the U.S. House of Representatives in Kansas's 2nd congressional district, seeking to succeed U.S. representative Jake LaTurner, who had announced his retirement a week before.

=== Tenure ===
Rep. Schmidt was sworn in to the 119th United States Congress on January 3, 2025.

Schmidt voted for the One Big Beautiful Bill Act.

=== Committee assignments ===
- Committee on Armed Services
  - Subcommittee on Military Personnel
  - Subcommittee on Readiness
  - Subcommittee on Tactical Air and Land Forces
- Committee on the Judiciary
  - Subcommittee on the Administrative State, Regulatory Reform, and Antitrust
  - Subcommittee on Immigration Integrity, Security, and Enforcement
  - Subcommittee on Oversight
- Committee on Small Business
  - Subcommittee on Innovation, Entrepreneurship, and Workforce Development
  - Subcommittee on Rural Development, Energy, and Supply Chains

=== Caucus memberships ===
- Main Street Caucus

== Personal life ==
Schmidt is a Lutheran.

== Electoral history ==
Kansas State Senate 15th District Republican Primary Election, 2000
| Party | Candidate | Votes | % |
|---|---|---|---|
| Republican | Derek Schmidt | 7,002 | 58.20 |
| Republican | Virgil Peck, Jr. | 5,029 | 41.80 |

Kansas State Senate 15th District General Election, 2000
| Party | Candidate | Votes | % |
|---|---|---|---|
| Republican | Derek Schmidt | 17,230 | 73.41 |
| Democratic | Johnetta Shelton | 6,240 | 26.59 |
| Republican hold | | | |

Kansas State Senate 15th District General Election, 2004
| Party | Candidate | Votes | % |
|---|---|---|---|
| Republican | Derek Schmidt (Incumbent) | 24,307 | 100.00 |
| Republican hold | | | |

Kansas State Senate 15th District General Election, 2008
| Party | Candidate | Votes | % |
|---|---|---|---|
| Republican | Derek Schmidt (Incumbent) | 24,259 | 100.00 |
| Republican hold | | | |

Kansas Attorney General Republican Primary Election, 2010
| Party | Candidate | Votes | % |
|---|---|---|---|
| Republican | Derek Schmidt | 208,611 | 76.30 |
| Republican | Ralph De Zago | 64,493 | 23.60 |

Kansas Attorney General General Election, 2010
| Party | Candidate | Votes | % |
|---|---|---|---|
| Republican | Derek Schmidt | 458,497 | 54.90 |
| Democratic | Steve Six (Incumbent) | 349,340 | 41.80 |
| Libertarian | Dennis Hawver | 26,867 | 3.20 |
| Republican gain from Democratic | | | |

Kansas Attorney General General Election, 2014
| Party | Candidate | Votes | % |
|---|---|---|---|
| Republican | Derek Schmidt (Incumbent) | 564,766 | 66.70 |
| Democratic | AJ Kotich | 281,105 | 33.20 |
| Republican hold | | | |

Kansas Attorney General General Election, 2018
| Party | Candidate | Votes | % |
|---|---|---|---|
| Republican | Derek Schmidt (Incumbent) | 599,773 | 59% |
| Democratic | Sarah G. Swain | 410,881 | 41% |
| Republican hold | | | |

Kansas Governor General Election, 2022
| Party | Candidate | Votes | % |
|---|---|---|---|
| Democratic | Laura Kelly (Incumbent) | 492,209 | 49% |
| Republican | Derek Schmidt | 471,323 | 47% |
| Independent | Dennis Pyle | 20,057 | 2% |
| Libertarian | Seth Cordell | 10,888 | 1% |
| Democratic hold | | | |

Kansas's 2nd Congressional District General Election, 2024
| Party | Candidate | Votes | % |
|---|---|---|---|
| Republican | Derek Schmidt | 172,847 | 57.1 |
| Democratic | Nancy Boyda | 115,685 | 38.2 |
| Libertarian | John Hauer | 14,229 | 4.7 |
| Total votes | | 302,761 | 100.0 |
| Republican hold | | | |

Kansas Senate
| Preceded by Lana Oleen | Majority Leader of the Kansas Senate; 2005–2011 | Succeeded by Jay Emler |
Party political offices
| Preceded by Phill Kline | Republican nominee for Attorney General of Kansas; 2010, 2014, 2018 | Succeeded by Kris Kobach |
| Preceded by Kris Kobach | Republican nominee for Governor of Kansas; 2022 | Succeeded by Ty Masterson |
Legal offices
| Preceded by Stephen Six | Attorney General of Kansas; 2011–2023 | Succeeded by Kris Kobach |
U.S. House of Representatives
| Preceded by Jake LaTurner | Member of the U.S. House of Representatives from Kansas's 2nd congressional district 2025–present | Incumbent |
U.S. order of precedence (ceremonial)
| Preceded by Luz Rivas | United States representatives by seniority 415th | Succeeded by Jefferson Shreve |
