= Stephen Six =

American attorney and former judge from Kansas

43rd Kansas Attorney General
- In office January 31, 2008 – January 10, 2011
- Governor: Kathleen Sebelius; Mark Parkinson
- Preceded by: Paul J. Morrison
- Succeeded by: Derek Schmidt

Personal details
- Born: Stephen Newton Six; December 11, 1965 (age 60) Lawrence, Kansas, U.S.
- Party: Democratic
- Spouse: Betsy Brand
- Education: Carleton College (BA); University of Kansas (JD)

Stephen Newton Six (born December 11, 1965) is an American attorney and former judge from Kansas who served as the state's 43rd Attorney General. He was nominated to serve as a judge on the United States Court of Appeals for the Tenth Circuit on March 9, 2011. His nomination was returned to the President on December 17, 2011, pursuant to the rules of the Senate. He served as a partner at the Kansas City, New York, and San Diego–based law firm, Stueve Siegel Hanson LLP.

== Early life and education ==
Stephen Six is the son of former Kansas Supreme Court Justice Fred Six. He received a Bachelor of Arts degree from Carleton College in Northfield, Minnesota, in 1988 and earned his J.D. degree from the University of Kansas in 1993.

== Career ==
Following graduation from law school, Six served as a law clerk to Judge Deanell Reece Tacha of the United States Court of Appeals for the Tenth Circuit. From 1994 to 2005, he served as a partner in the Kansas City, Missouri, law firm of Shamberg, Johnson, and Bergman. He was appointed as a judge on the Douglas County Circuit Court by Governor Sebelius in January 2005, serving in that post until his appointment as attorney general by Governor Kathleen Sebelius in 2008.

Six was defeated in the 2010 general election by Republican State Senate Majority Leader Derek Schmidt.

Following completion of his service as attorney general, he became a partner in the Kansas City, Missouri, firm Stueve Siegel Hanson LLP.

=== 43rd Attorney General of Kansas ===
Six was recognized by Kansas editorial boards for restoring professionalism and stability to the office after the tenures of previous Attorneys General, Republican Phill Kline whose bar privileges were suspended, and Democrat Paul J. Morrison whose personal problems forced him from office. Six was also recognized for cutting the office's taxpayer-funded budget almost in half.

Six focused the office on protecting consumers and cracking down on fraud and waste in the state Medicaid program. During Six's tenure, the Consumer Protection Division recovered $39.5 million on behalf of Kansans. The Medicaid Fraud Division recovered $66.2 million.

In 2008, Six became the first Kansas Attorney General in 35 years to personally prosecute a case. He earned a jury conviction in 2008 of Kenneth Wilson for the first-degree murder of Scott Noel in Osborne County, Kansas. He earned a jury conviction in 2009 of Israel Mireles for the capital murder of Emily Sander in Butler County, Kansas.

On December 1, 2008, Attorney General Six argued before the United States Supreme Court in Kansas v. Colorado, a dispute over Colorado's overuse of water in the Arkansas River.

=== Failed nomination to the Tenth Circuit ===
On March 9, 2011, President Barack Obama nominated Six to the United States Court of Appeals for the Tenth Circuit, to fill the vacancy left by Judge Deanell Reece Tacha who assumed senior status on January 27, 2011. His nomination was strongly opposed by his home state senators, Pat Roberts and Jerry Moran, who initially returned positive blue slips. During a May 2011 hearing, Moran and Roberts asked then-Chairman Leahy not to proceed with the nomination while rescinding their blue slips. Because of that opposition, the Judiciary Committee chose not to take up his nomination. His nomination and others were returned to the president on December 17, 2011, pursuant to the rules of the Senate, and the president chose not to renominate him.

== Personal ==
Six is married to Betsy Brand Six, a law professor at the University of Kansas and is a member of the United Church of Christ.

== See also ==
- Barack Obama judicial appointment controversies

Party political offices
Preceded by Paul J. Morrison	Democratic nominee for Kansas Attorney General; 2010	Succeeded by A. J. Kotich
Legal offices
Preceded by Paul J. Morrison	Attorney General of Kansas; 2008–2011	Succeeded by Derek Schmidt
