= Chris Biggs =

American lawyer and politician

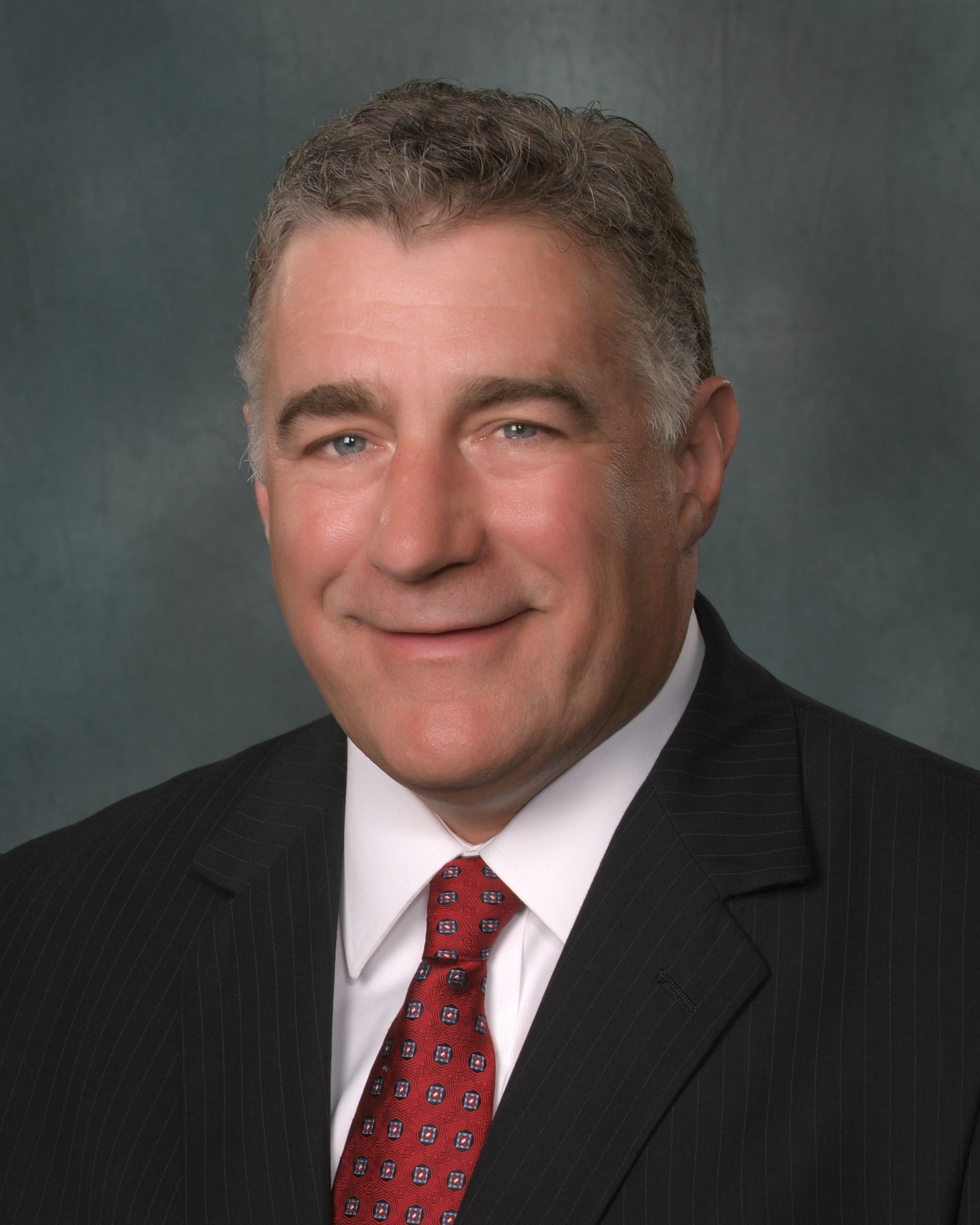

30th Secretary of State of Kansas
- In office March 16, 2010 – January 10, 2011
- Governor: Mark Parkinson
- Preceded by: Ron Thornburgh
- Succeeded by: Kris Kobach

Kansas Securities Commissioner
- In office May 7, 2003 – March 16, 2010
- Governor: Kathleen Sebelius; Mark Parkinson
- Preceded by: David Brant
- Succeeded by: Steve Wassom (interim)

Personal details
- Born: Christopher Eugenio Biggs; October 14, 1958 (age 68) Kansas City, Missouri, U.S.
- Party: Democratic
- Education: Kansas State University University of Kansas
- Profession: Attorney

Christopher Eugenio Biggs (born October 14, 1958) is an American lawyer and politician who was the 30th Secretary of State of Kansas. He was appointed on March 16, 2010, by Governor Mark Parkinson to replace Ron Thornburgh who resigned on February 15, 2010. On Nov. 2nd, 2010, he was defeated for election to a full term by a wide margin.

Biggs Served as Kansas Securities Commissioner from 2003 until his appointment as Secretary of State. Prior to that, he served as Geary County Prosecutor from 1989 to 2003 and as a public defender from 1983 to 1988.

In 2002, he was the Democratic nominee for Attorney General. Though he lost to Republican Phill Kline by only 0.5%, he declined to request a recount.

== Early life ==
Biggs was born on October 14, 1958, in Kansas City, Missouri, as the youngest of five children. His family settled in Manhattan, Kansas, when Chris was a child. His father, John, ran a local hardware store and served as a state restaurant inspector. His mother, Bernice, was a staff secretary at Kansas State University. He graduated from Manhattan High School in 1976.

== Education ==
Biggs graduated magna cum laude and Phi Beta Kappa from Kansas State University in 1980 with a Bachelor of Arts in Social Work. He attended the University of Kansas School of Law, graduating in 1983.

== Legal career ==
Upon graduation from law school, Biggs started working as a public defender for the 8th Judicial District in Kansas, based in Junction City. His first case was an argument in front of the Kansas Supreme Court.

In 1988, Biggs was elected to serve as the prosecutor for Geary County, and was subsequently re-elected three times. In the 14 years he served as prosecutor, he tried over 20,000 cases; the most notable of these was the trial of Sabine Davidson. Davidson was charged with unintentional second-degree murder in the death of an 11-year-old boy who had been mauled by her three Rottweilers. Biggs’ prosecution of Davidson resulted in a conviction of second-degree murder and a sentence of 12 years in prison—the first conviction of its kind in the nation. The trial earned Biggs the 1998 Kansas Outstanding Prosecutor Award.

== 2002 election for Attorney General ==
In 2002, incumbent Attorney General of Kansas Carla Stovall chose not to seek re-election. Phill Kline, a former state legislator, emerged from a bruising Republican primary, defeating David Adkins; Biggs ran unopposed in the Democratic primary.

Biggs was endorsed by the Mainstream Coalition, the Fraternal Order of Police, the Kansas City Star, the Wichita Eagle, former Attorney General Vern Miller, and the Topeka Capital-Journal.

Though Kline led in the polls throughout the race, the final tally was too close to call on election night; in the end, Kline won by 0.5% of the total vote (4,287 vote margin out of 821,107 cast).

== Kansas Securities Commissioner ==
In May 2003, Governor of Kansas Kathleen Sebelius named Biggs to be the Kansas Securities Commissioner, saying that Biggs "was a good fit." As Securities Commissioner, Biggs personally prosecuted Thomas Etheredge, founder of the failed Wild West World theme park north of Wichita, for securities fraud; Etheredge was convicted on seven of nine counts and sentenced to five years in prison.

== Secretary of State ==
In January 2010, Biggs announced his candidacy for Secretary of State. On February 15, 2010, then-Secretary of State Ron Thornburgh announced his resignation in order to run for governor. After interviewing 15 candidates, Governor Mark Parkinson chose Biggs to fill the vacancy.

Biggs was only the second (after Larry Ryan) Democratic Secretary of State in Kansas since statehood, and was the first in nearly 60 years.

== 2010 Election ==
Biggs faced a primary challenge for the Democratic nomination for Secretary of State by Kansas State Sen. Chris Steineger, whom he defeated with a 60%-40% victory in the August 3rd election. On the Republican side, a three-way battle for the nomination was won by Kris Kobach, a University of Missouri-Kansas City law professor and former Kansas State Republican Party chairman; he defeated Shawnee County Elections Commissioner Elizabeth Ensley and JR Claeys, capturing 51% of the vote.

On November 2, 2010, Kobach defeated Biggs by a margin of 59%-37%.

== Personal life ==
Biggs is an accomplished bluegrass musician. He has won several awards for his guitar-playing skills, including three straight third-place finishes at the National Flatpicking Championships held each year at the Walnut Valley Festival in Winfield, KS. He was the Kansas Guitar Picking Champion in 1982, 1990, 1994, and 2024 as well as the Kansas Banjo Picking Champion in 1994.

He now performs regularly in a duo with Ken Gustin, and plays banjo with a gospel group, North Forty, headed by his long-time friend, Al Bowyer. He also performs with Scott Tichenor, a friend and renowned mandolin player from Lawrence, Kansas. He has performed with Steve Hinrichs as a duo, and periodically performs with other area musicians, including Robert Rosenberg, Alice Boyle, and Bob Atchison.

He has been involved in several civic organizations: Big Brothers and Big Sisters, Rotary International, the Kansas County and District Attorneys Association, the Kansas Bar Association, and the Kansas Bluegrass Association.

Biggs lives in the Flint Hills with his son.

Party political offices
Preceded by Dan Lykins	Democratic nominee for Kansas Attorney General; 2002	Succeeded by Paul J. Morrison
Preceded by David Haley	Democratic nominee for Secretary of State of Kansas; 2010	Succeeded by Jean Schodorf
Political offices
Preceded by Ron Thornburgh	Secretary of State of Kansas; 2010–2011	Succeeded by Kris Kobach
