= 2006 Kansas Attorney General election =

- November 7, 2006
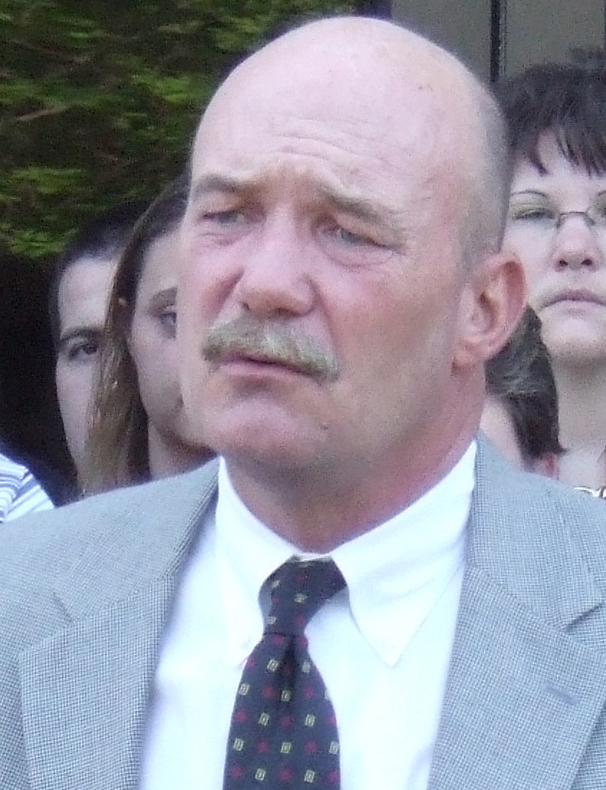

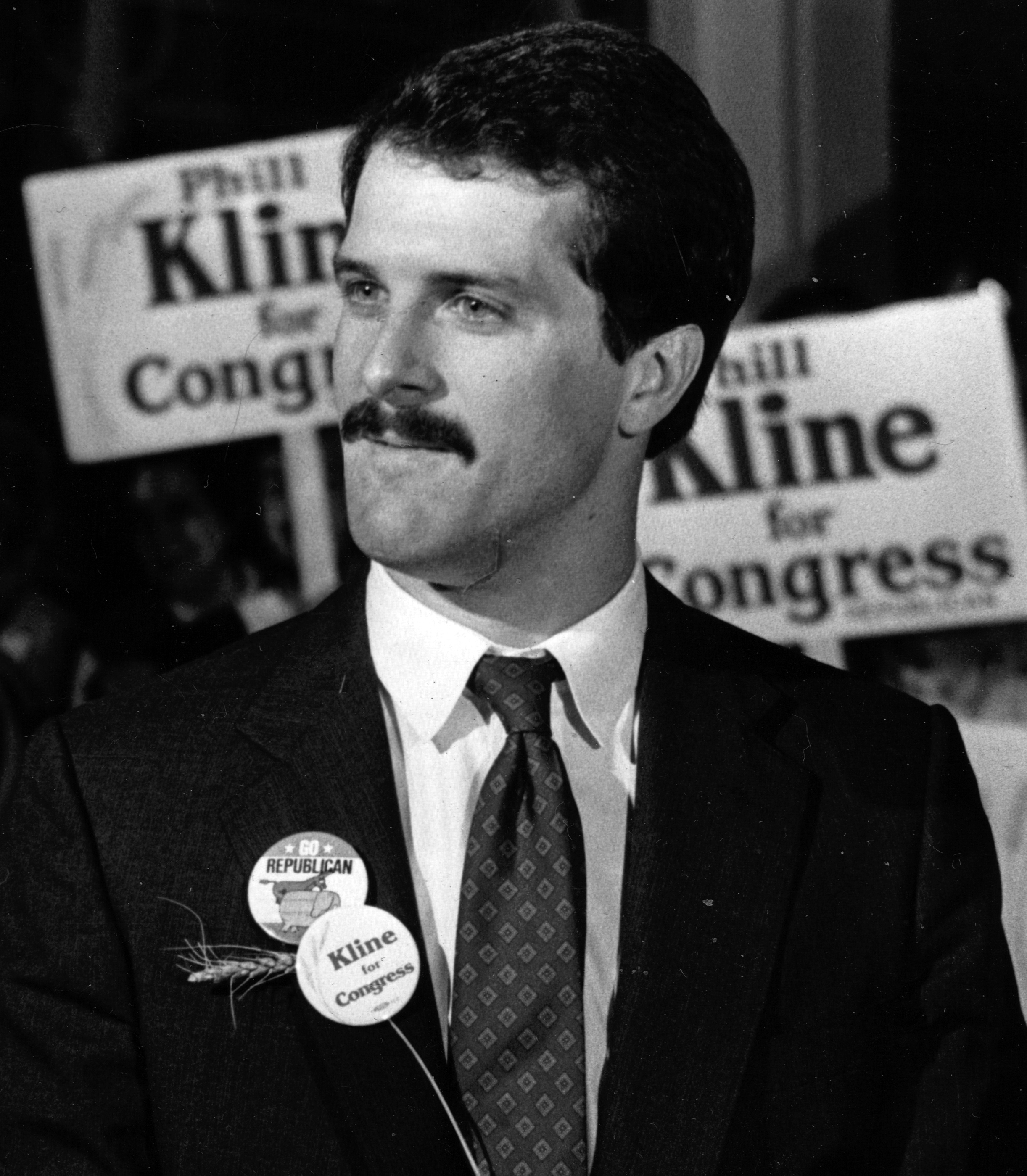
Nominee	Paul J. Morrison	Phill Kline
Party	Democratic	Republican
Popular vote	491,422	348,509
Percentage	58.51%	41.49%
- County results Morrison: 50–60% 60–70% 70–80% Kline: 50–60% 60–70% 70–80%
Attorney General before election
Phill Kline
Republican
Elected Attorney General
Paul J. Morrison
Democratic

The 2006 Kansas Attorney General election was held on November 7, 2006, to elect the Kansas Attorney General. Republican incumbent Phill Kline ran for re-election but lost by a wide margin of seventeen percentage points to Democratic district attorney Paul J. Morrison. This was the last time a Democrat had been elected Kansas Attorney General until 2026.

== Republican primary ==
=== Candidates ===
- Phill Kline, incumbent Kansas Attorney General (2003–2007)

=== Results ===
Republican primary results
Party	Candidate	Votes	%
Republican	Phill Kline	162,208	100.00%
Total votes		162,208	100.00%

== Democratic primary ==
=== Candidates ===
- Paul J. Morrison, District Attorney for Johnson County, Kansas (1990–2007)

=== Results ===
Democratic primary results
Party	Candidate	Votes	%
Democratic	Paul J. Morrison	69,606	100.00%
Total votes		69,606	100.00%

== General election ==
=== Candidates ===
- Paul J. Morrison, District Attorney for Johnson County, Kansas (1990–2007) (Democratic)
- Phill Kline, incumbent Kansas Attorney General (2003–2007) (Republican)

=== Results ===
2006 Kansas Attorney General election results
Party	Candidate	Votes	%	±%
Democratic	Paul J. Morrison	491,422	58.51%	+8.77%
Republican	Phill Kline	348,509	41.49%	−8.77%
Total votes		839,931	100.00%	
Democratic gain from Republican				
