= Burlingame High School =

Burlingame is a name for a couple of high schools in the United States, including:

- Burlingame High School (California)
- Burlingame High School (Kansas)
