= Burlingame USD 454 =

Public school district in Burlingame, Kansas

Location
- 100 Bloomquist Dr. #A; Burlingame, Kansas 66413
- Coordinates: 38°45′30.6252″N 95°50′8.1312″W

District information
- Type: Public
- Grades: Pre-K through 12
- Superintendent: Allen Konicek
- Accreditation(s): KSHSAA
- Schools: 3

Students and staff
- Athletic conference: Lyon County League

Other information
- Website: usd454.net

Burlingame USD 454, also known as Burlingame Public Schools, is a public unified school district headquartered in Burlingame, Kansas, United States. The district serves Osage County.

== History ==
Donald Blome, who had been the superintendent of USD 454, was hired as the superintendent of Garnett USD 365 in 2008.

== Schools ==
The school district operates the following schools:

- Burlingame High School
- Burlingame Junior High School
- Burlingame Elementary School

== See also ==
- Kansas State Department of Education
- Kansas State High School Activities Association
- List of high schools in Kansas
- List of unified school districts in Kansas
