= Earl Wilbur Sutherland Jr. =

American pharmacologist and biochemist (1915–1974)

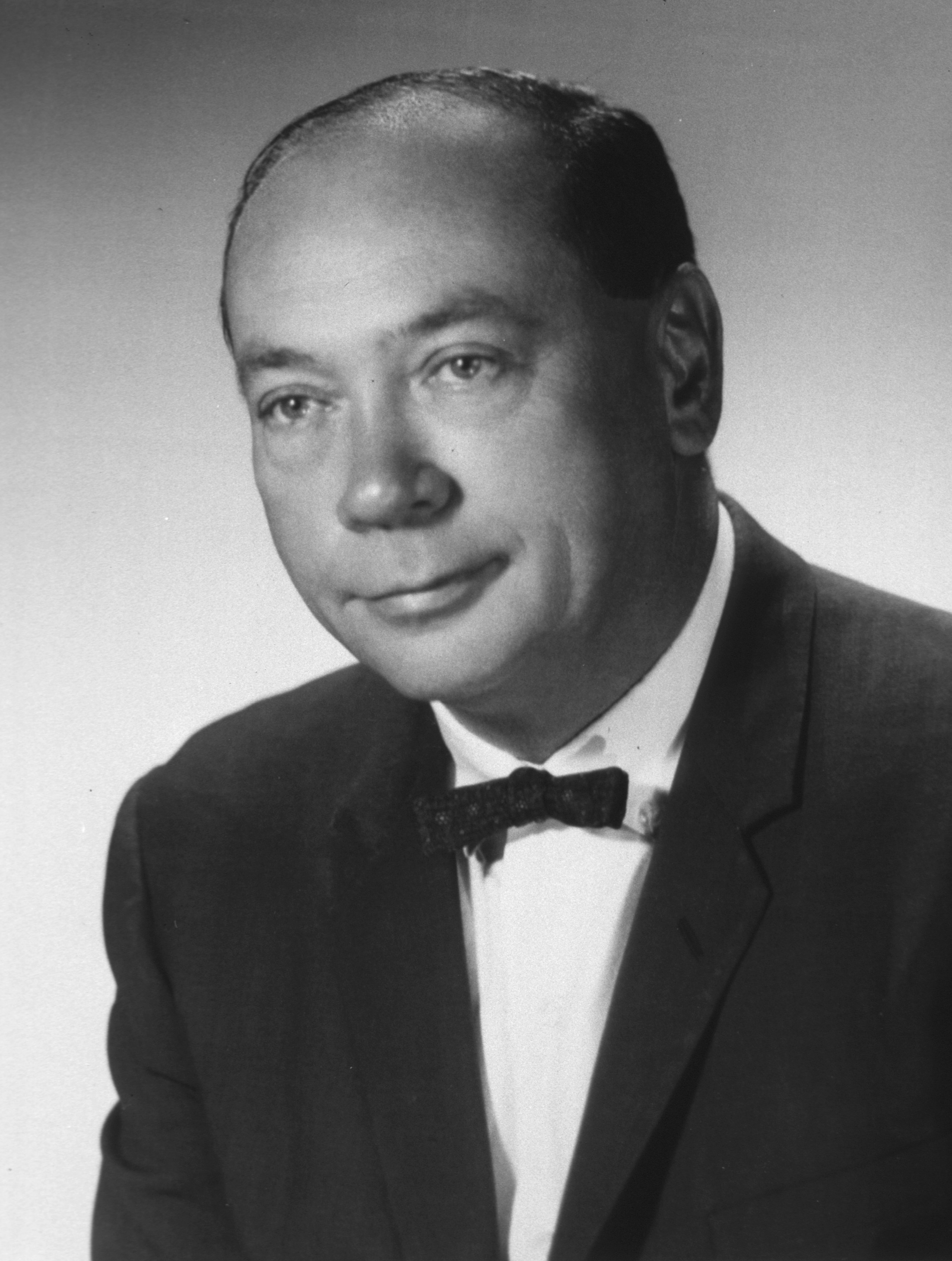
- Sutherland, c. 1970
- Born: November 19, 1915; Burlingame, Kansas, U.S.
- Died: March 9, 1974 (aged 58); Miami, Florida, U.S.
- Education: Washington University in St. Louis (M.D); Washburn University (B.S)
- Known for: Epinephrine, cyclic AMP
- Awards: Gairdner Foundation International Award (1969); Albert Lasker Award for Basic Medical Research (1970); Dickson Prize (1971); Nobel Prize in Physiology or Medicine (1971); National Medal of Science (1973)
- Scientific career
- Fields: Biochemistry
- Workplaces: Vanderbilt University, Case Western Reserve University, Washington University School of Medicine, University of Miami
- Doctoral students: Ferid Murad

Earl Wilbur Sutherland Jr. (November 19, 1915 – March 9, 1974) was an American pharmacologist and biochemist born in Burlingame, Kansas. Sutherland won a Nobel Prize in Physiology or Medicine in 1971 "for his discoveries concerning the mechanisms of the action of hormones", especially epinephrine, via second messengers, namely cyclic adenosine monophosphate, or cyclic AMP.

== Early life and education ==
Sutherland was born on November 19, 1915, in Burlingame, Kansas. The second youngest of six children, he was raised by his mother, Edith M. Hartshorn, and his father, Earl W. Sutherland. Though his father, who was originally from Wisconsin, had attended Grinnell College for two years, he ultimately led an agrarian lifestyle that took him to both New Mexico and Oklahoma before settling down in Burlingame to raise a family. Edith, a Missouri native, had some training in nursing at what was called a "ladies college". To provide for the family, Sutherland's father ran a dry goods store, where he gave each of his children working jobs. Sutherland began fishing at the age of five, and this became a pastime that he enjoyed for most of his life.

As a high school student, Sutherland played and excelled in several sports, including tennis, basketball, and football.

In 1933, at the age of 17, Sutherland enrolled in Washburn College in Topeka, Kansas and began the pursuit of a Bachelor of Science degree. In order to pay for tuition, he worked throughout his undergraduate years as a medical staff assistant at a local hospital. Sutherland graduated in 1937, at the age of 21. He was then accepted to Washington University School of Medicine in St. Louis, where he developed a strong mentorship with Carl Ferdinand Cori. In 1942, Sutherland graduated with a Doctor of Medicine.

== Career ==
=== Academia and research ===
In 1940, while studying at the Washington University School of Medicine, Sutherland had his first encounter with research as an assistant in pharmacology in the laboratory of Carl Ferdinand Cori, who won a Nobel Prize in Physiology or Medicine in 1947 for his discovery of the mechanism of glycogen metabolism. Under Cori's guidance, Sutherland conducted research on the effects of the hormones epinephrine and glucagon on the breakdown of glycogen to glucose. In 1942, he worked as an intern at Barnes-Jewish Hospital in St. Louis.

After receiving his medical degree from Washington University in 1942, Sutherland served as a World War II army physician. He returned to Washington University in St. Louis in 1945, where he continued to do research in Cori's Laboratory. Sutherland accredits his decision to pursue a research career, as opposed to entering the medical profession, to his mentor Cori.

Sutherland held various teaching titles during his time at the Washington University School of Medicine, including instructor in pharmacology (1945–46), instructor in biochemistry (1946–50), assistant professor in biochemistry (1950–52), and associate professor in biochemistry (1952–53).

In 1953, Sutherland moved to Cleveland a position as a professor of pharmacology and chairman of the department of pharmacology at the school of medicine at Case Western Reserve University. There, he collaborated with Theodore W. Rall, also a professor of pharmacology, who was to become a lifelong research partner. Together, they conducted further research on the mechanism of hormone action at the molecular level. During his ten years at Case Western Reserve University, Sutherland made several ground-breaking discoveries that led to the identification of cyclic adenosine monophosphate, or cyclic AMP, and its role as a secondary messenger.

In 1963, Sutherland became professor of anatomy at Vanderbilt University School of Medicine in Nashville. His position allowed him to devote more time to his research. He continued his work on cyclic AMP, receiving financial support from the Career Investigatorship awarded to him by the American Heart Association in 1967. He held his teaching title at Vanderbilt University until 1973.

In 1973, after spending 10 years at Vanderbilt University, Sutherland moved to Miami, where he joined the faculty at Miller School of Medicine at the University of Miami as a distinguished professor of biochemistry. He continued to be involved in novel research about adenosine monophosphate and guanosine monophosphate, co-authoring four papers in 1973 alone.

=== Discovery of cyclic AMP ===
While working in Cori's laboratory, Sutherland, with the help of his co-workers, made several discoveries concerning the mechanism of glycogen metabolism that, years later, led him to his discovery of the biological activity of cyclic AMP. Cori's laboratory had previously established the basic mechanism of glycogen metabolism, for which they were awarded the Nobel Prize in Physiology or Medicine. Sutherland helped to identify the importance of liver phosphorylase (LP) in the process of glycogenolysis. Of the three basic enzymes involved in glycogenolysis, he found that LP was rate-limiting, meaning that the progression of glycogen metabolism is dependent on this enzyme. LP would become the subject of his research for the next several years, and it was through experimentation on LP and hormone interaction that his most renowned discovery was made.

After identifying the importance of LP, Sutherland moved his research efforts to Western Reserve University. There, he worked in collaboration with Ted Rall, Walter D Wosilait, and Jacques Berthet to publish a series of papers in the Journal of Biological Chemistry, "The Relationship of Epinephrine and Glucagon to Liver Phosphorylase", which was released in four parts. These four papers document the purification of LP and the analysis of several of its properties. First, it was determined that the enzymatic activity of LP depends on the addition or removal of a phosphate group, a process called phosphorylation. In a later experiment, they demonstrated that more phosphate is taken up in liver slices when epinephrine and glucagon are added, suggesting that these hormones were promoting the phosphorylation of LP, activating the enzyme. The results of a later paper in the series suggested that this phosphorylation and activation of LP was a result of the action of phosphorylase kinase. This series also investigated the inactivation of liver phosphorylase and characterized an enzyme they initially called LP-inactivating enzyme, which functions by cleaving the phosphate group. This enzyme was later renamed liver phosphorylase phosphatase. These papers also characterized LP in terms of molecular weight and other factors. During their analysis, they found the unexpected result that LP activation increased with the addition of 5-AMP, which is a precursor of cAMP; however, this was not known at the time.

The fourth paper published in this series, "The Relationship of Epinephrine and Glucagon to Liver Phosphorylase: IV Effect of Epinephrine and Glucagon on the Reactivation of Phosphorylase in Liver Homogenates", was published in 1956. In this paper, Sutherland and associates furthered their investigation of epinephrine and glucagon. The key to the success of this experiment was the use a homogenate of liver cells rather than intact liver cells, as they had been doing in their previous experiments. The general consensus among researchers at that time was that the study of hormones was only possible using intact cells; this was the first instance that a hormone pathway was studied using a cell homogenate. Sutherland and his co-authors were able to observe similar effects in liver homogenate to what was observed in whole liver slices. More importantly, they were able to observe this response in two stages. This stage response was characterized by the particulate fraction producing an unknown heat stable factor in the presence of the hormones epinephrine and glucagon. This factor then stimulates the formation of liver phosphorylase in a fraction of the homogenate where the hormones are not present. This unknown heat stable factor, which was produced in the presence of hormones and ultimately led to the secondary formation of liver phosphorylase, was later termed cyclic AMP.

Even though the discovery of cyclic AMP and the idea of second messengers were of great importance to the world of medicine, Sutherland's findings were actually achieved through strenuous trial and error. First of all, Sutherland and Ted Rall were convinced that a sucrose homogenate of liver cells was absolutely necessary in order to keep their cells healthy and proliferating. This inference was made by Rall from his experience studying mitochondria, which responded well to these sucrose homogenates; however, it had nothing to do with what was being studied at the time. It turned out that this sucrose was not necessary for the homogenate and once they set up the experiment without sucrose they were able to see more effective results. Secondly, Sutherland initially believed that there was something vital about the intact cell, and that disrupting its structure would not produce any hormonal effect. However, after some debate, Rall had convinced Sutherland to use liver homogenates. Once they had witnessed nearly a doubling of the rate of LP activation, they knew this belief in that keeping cells intact was crucial to studying the effects of hormones was not necessarily true, at least in this case. Finally, Sutherland had decided to ignore Jacques Berthet's request to conduct the same experiment using proper lab technique, specifically the Lehninger Hard Pour, where the supernatant material was decanted by pouring the liquid into another test tube once the particulate fraction reached the top of the original tube. Berthet not only demanded this step of the procedure be done through careful aspiration, he also critiqued the lack of specificity during centrifugation with respect to suspension height, rpm and time. The willingness of Sutherland and his associates to modify their experimental procedures and mistaken assumptions allowed them to make the discoveries that they made.

== Personal life ==
Sutherland married Mildred Rice in 1937, the same year that he graduated from Washburn College. In 1944, during World War II, Sutherland was called into service as a battalion surgeon under General George S. Patton, and was later sent to Germany, where he served as a staff physician in a military hospital until 1945. He had two sons and a daughter with Mildred Rice.

In 1962, Sutherland divorced his first wife. A year later, when he became professor of physiology at Vanderbilt University, Sutherland married Claudia Sebeste Smith, the assistant dean at the university, and they were together for the remainder of Sutherland's life.

== Awards and achievements ==
- 1937 – Bachelor of Science from Washburn College in Topeka, Kansas;
- 1942 – Doctor of medicine from Washington University School of Medicine in St. Louis, Missouri;
- 1969 – Torald Sollman Award in Pharmacology | Gairdner Foundation International Award;
- 1970 – Albert Lasker Award for Basic Medical Research;
- 1971 – Nobel Prize in Physiology or Medicine | Achievement Award from the American Heart Association;
- 1971 – Golden Plate Award of the American Academy of Achievement;
- 1973 – National Medal of Science awarded by Richard Nixon.

In 1952, Sutherland was awarded the Banting Memorial Lectureship and, in 1953, was elected as the Chairman of the Case Western Reserve University Department of Pharmacology in Cleveland, Ohio. He was awarded the Career Investigator position at the American Heart Association in 1967 and was elected as member of the National Academy of Sciences in 1973.

Sutherland was also a member of various scientific societies which included the American Society of Biological Chemists, the American Chemical Society, the American Society for Pharmacology and Experimental Therapeutics, the American Association for the Advancement of Science, and Sigma Xi. From 1951 to 1956, Sutherland was a member of the editorial board for the Biochemical Preparations Journal. The editorial board of the Journal of Pharmacology and Experimental Therapeutics sought is attention from 1957 to 1958.

== Death ==
On March 9, 1974, Sutherland died of internal bleeding due to surgical complications following a massive esophageal hemorrhage. He was 58 years old.

== Legacy ==
After Sutherland's death, in 1974, the Miller School of Medicine established the Sutherland Memorial Lecture. In 1976, Vanderbilt University created the Sutherland Prize which is awarded annually to a faculty member whose work has garnered them national, if not international, acclaim and respect. Recipients are awarded $5,000, and their name is engraved on a silver bowl. Vanderbilt honored Sutherland in 1997 by starting a Sutherland lecture, and again in 2001 in the creation of the Sutherland Chair of Pharmacology. Heidi E. Hamm, a member of the Vanderbilt faculty, was appointed to this position upon its establishment and still maintains this title.
