= Burlingame's Fort =

In 1862 the citizens of Burlingame, Kansas, constructed a stone fort around the town well, in an intersection in the business district. This was done to prevent the burning of Burlingame by Confederate guerrilla William Anderson, later known as Bloody Bill Anderson. He and his family had lived in a neighboring county up to 1862, but Anderson got into considerable trouble and was forced to leave. Upon leaving, Anderson threatened to burn Burlingame.

The townspeople constructed the circular fort day and night until it was completed. When completed the fort was twenty-five feet across and had a wall thirty inches thick, constructed of stone. The wall was eight feet high and had twenty-five gun holes for its defenders to fire through if under attack. Supposedly the fort was large enough to contain the entire population of Burlingame within its walls.

The fort was manned periodically by armed men or troops. When troops manned it, they camped nearby, not inside the fort. When the area's men were called to duty to fight Confederates elsewhere, women and children manned the fort. Mrs. G. W. "Aunt Fanny" Hoover commanded the fort during these times.

When the men left in September 1864 to meet the Confederate invasion under Maj. Gen. Sterling Price, Mrs. Hoover received word that the Union forces had been decimated. She abandoned the fort, but the information about the defeat was incorrect.

After the Civil War the fort's stones were used to construct a Baptist church.
