= Ron Thornburgh =

American politician

Ron E. Thornburgh

29th Secretary of State of Kansas
- In office January 9, 1995 – February 15, 2010
- Governor: Bill Graves; Kathleen Sebelius; Mark Parkinson
- Preceded by: Bill Graves
- Succeeded by: Chris Biggs

Personal details
- Born: December 31, 1962 (age 63) Burlingame, Kansas, U.S.
- Party: Republican
- Spouse: Annette Thornburgh
- Children: 2
- Education: Washburn University

Ron E. Thornburgh, (born December 31, 1962, Burlingame, Kansas) was the 29th Secretary of State of Kansas. He was elected into his first term in 1994 and was subsequently re-elected in 1998, 2002, and 2006.

In July 2007, Thornburgh announced his intentions to explore a run for governor of Kansas in 2010 by appointing a state treasurer, which would allow him to begin raising money. He said, "This is a game in which timing is everything. The time feels right for us right now, in that we've got great support around the state of Kansas".

He abandoned his plans for a gubernatorial candidacy after Senator Sam Brownback indicated he would run for the post in the 2010 election. In order to enter the private sector, Thornburgh resigned as Secretary of State of Kansas on February 15, 2010. Democratic Governor Mark Parkinson, a former Republican, appointed Democrat Chris Biggs to the position for the remainder of Thornburgh's term.

== Secretary of State ==
On Thornburg's initiative, the Interstate Voter Registration Crosscheck (commonly referred to as IVRC or Crosscheck) database software system designed to compare voter records from other states and identify voters registered in two or more states was launched. Crosscheck was developed in 2005 by Kansas and Secretary Thornburgh, which was in conjunction with Iowa, Missouri, and Nebraska to compare voter registration data and identify any Americans who may have voted twice in recent elections. Crosscheck has been strongly criticized by critics such as reporter Greg Palast, Indiana State Conference of the National Association for the Advancement of Colored People, and the League of Women Voters of Indiana, for racially motivated voter caging of non-white registered voters in the United States in NAACP and the League of Women Voters.

== Personal life ==
Thornburgh graduated from Burlingame High School in 1981 and from Washburn University in 1985. He identifies himself as a Native American. He and his wife, Annette, have two children.

Party political offices
Preceded by Bill Graves	Republican nominee for Secretary of State of Kansas; 1994, 1998, 2002, 2006	Succeeded by Kris Kobach
Political offices
Preceded by Bill Graves	Secretary of State of Kansas; 1995–2010	Succeeded by Chris Biggs
