= Robert Stephan =

American politician (1933–2023)

39th Kansas Attorney General
- In office 1979–1995
- Preceded by: Curt T. Schneider
- Succeeded by: Carla Stovall

Personal details
- Born: Robert Taft Stephan; January 16, 1933 Wichita, Kansas, U.S.
- Died: January 2, 2023 (aged 89)
- Party: Republican
- Education: Washburn University School of Law

Robert Taft Stephan (January 16, 1933 – January 2, 2023) was an American attorney who served four terms as Kansas Attorney General.

Stephan was born on January 16, 1933, to Taft and Julia Stephan, of Lebanese descent. He graduated from Washburn University School of Law in 1957 and practiced law in Wichita, Kansas. After losing a campaign for local school board, he was appointed a municipal court judge and two years later elected to the district court in Wichita. He first won election as state Attorney General in 1978 and was reelected three times in 1982, 1986, and 1990.

Following the end of his last term, Stephan moved to Lenexa, Kansas, and worked as a consultant in corporate law dealing in consumer protection and Federal Trade Commission regulations.

In 2007, Stephan spoke in support of legalizing medical cannabis in Kansas.

Stephan died on January 2, 2023, two weeks shy of his 90th birthday.

Party political offices
Preceded by Tom Van Sickle	Republican nominee for Kansas Attorney General; 1978, 1982, 1986, 1990	Succeeded by Carla Stovall
Legal offices
Preceded by Curt T. Schneider	Attorney General of Kansas; 1979–1995	Succeeded by Carla Stovall
