= Paul J. Morrison =

American lawyer

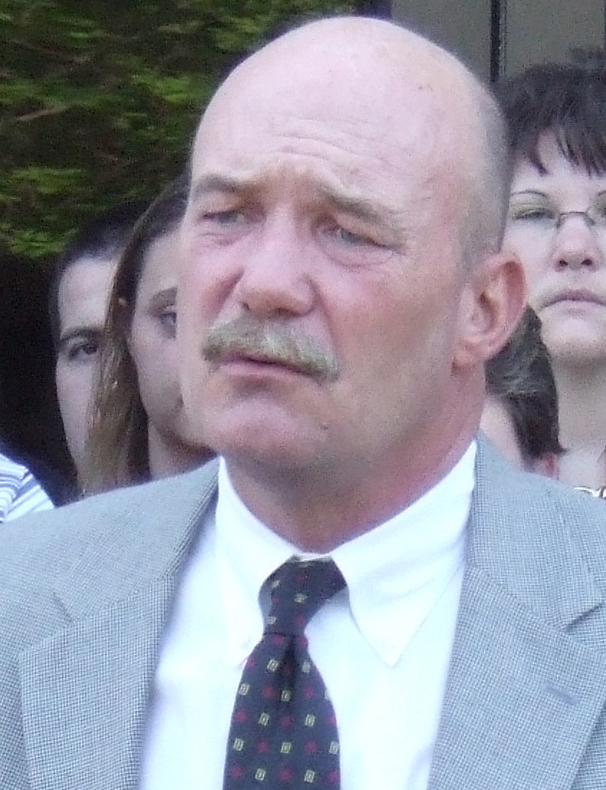

42nd Kansas Attorney General
- In office January 8, 2007 – January 31, 2008
- Governor: Kathleen Sebelius
- Preceded by: Phill Kline
- Succeeded by: Stephen Six

Personal details
- Born: June 1, 1954 (age 72) Dodge City, Kansas, U.S.
- Party: Republican (before 2005); Democratic (2005–present)
- Spouse: Joyce Morrison
- Profession: Attorney

Paul J. Morrison (born June 1, 1954) is an American lawyer and former Attorney General of Kansas. Morrison attended Washburn University and Washburn School of Law, graduating in 1980. While at Washburn, he was a member of the Kansas Beta chapter of Phi Delta Theta.

== Career ==
Morrison was sworn in as the 42nd Kansas Attorney General following a 26-year career in law enforcement. He previously served as the District Attorney for Johnson County, Kansas, from 1990 until January 2007. In 2005, Morrison switched from the Republican to the Democratic Party and announced he would challenge Republican Phill Kline in 2006 for Attorney General. On November 7, 2006, Morrison defeated Kline with 58% of the vote. Morrison took office on January 8, 2007. Kline succeeded Morrison as Johnson County District Attorney. On December 14, 2007, in the midst of a scandal involving a former employee while he was Johnson County District Attorney, Morrison announced his resignation effective January 31, 2008.

During his term, Attorney General Paul Morrison made domestic violence, victim services, and cyber crime a priority, re-organizing the office and providing new resources to fight these important crimes. A career prosecutor, Morrison has personally argued nearly 100 jury trials including the complex murder cases of notorious serial killers Richard Grissom and John Edward Robinson. Morrison continued to personally prosecute cases as Kansas Attorney General.

== Scandal and resignation ==
=== Extramarital affair ===
In December 2007 allegations surfaced that Morrison had an extramarital affair with an office administrator, Linda Carter, in the district attorney's office, that continued after he was elected Attorney General. Carter filed a sexual harassment claim with the EEOC, alleging that Morrison pressured her to obtain sensitive information about Kline and several pending investigations at the district attorney's office. Morrison admitted to the infidelity, but denies any impropriety, sexual harassment, pressure to obtain sensitive information, or undue influence the course of an investigation.

=== Resignation ===
Morrison announced his resignation on December 14, stating that his tenure would end on January 31, 2008. On that date, Morrison was succeeded as Attorney General by Douglas County District Court Judge Stephen Six.

=== Later career ===
Paul Morrison is currently a criminal defense and family law attorney in Olathe, Kansas.

== Awards ==
Morrison is a recipient of the Clarence M. Kelly Award for Excellence in Criminal Justice Administration. The Kansas County and District Attorneys Association honored him with "Prosecutor of the Year" award in 2001 and the "Lifetime Achievement Award" in 2007.

Party political offices
Preceded by Chris Biggs	Democratic nominee for Kansas Attorney General; 2006	Succeeded by Stephen Six
Legal offices
Preceded by Phill Kline	Attorney General of Kansas; 2007–2008	Succeeded by Stephen Six
