= Burlingame, Kansas =

City in Osage County, Kansas

- City
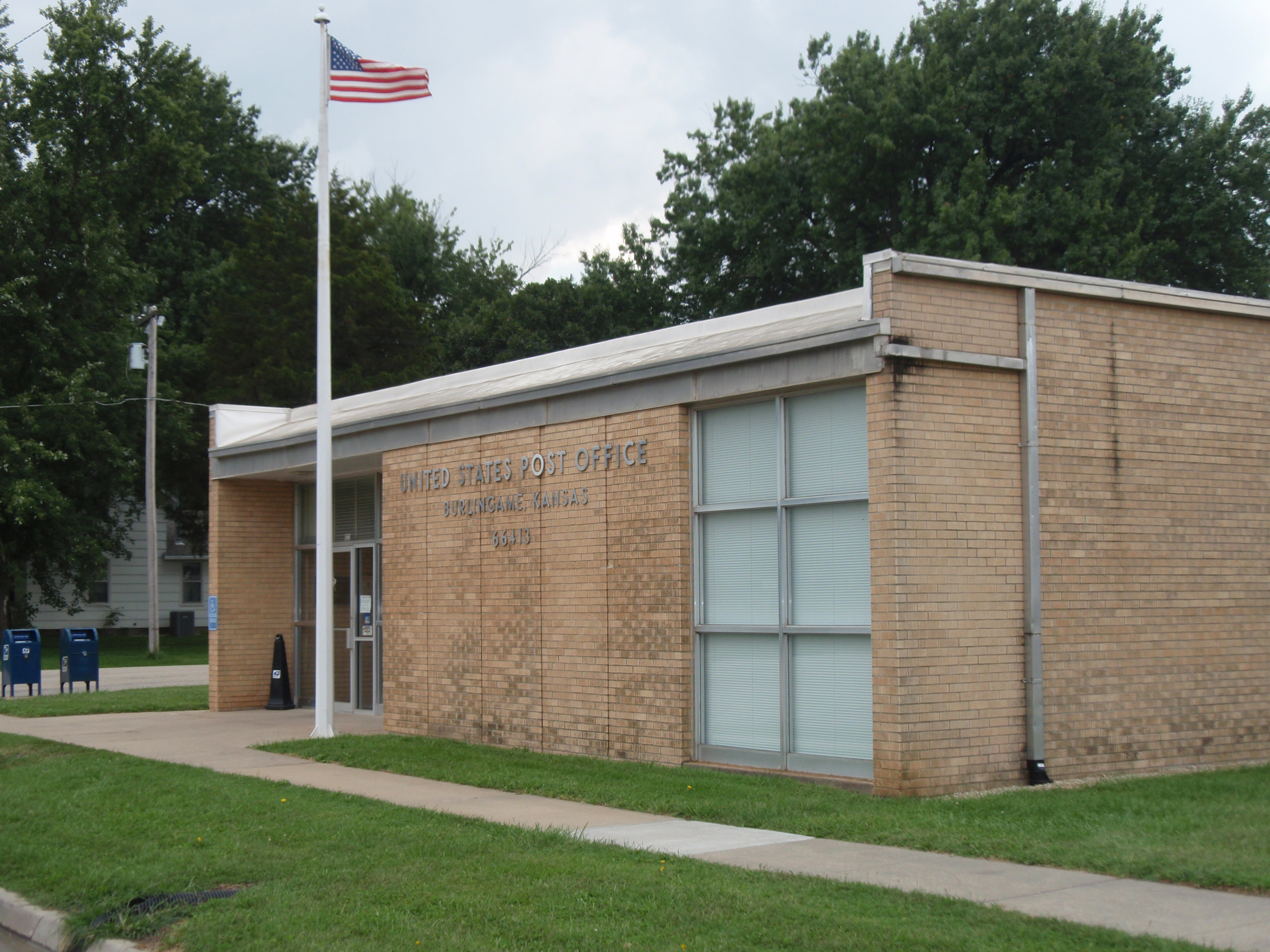
- U.S. post office in Burlingame (2009)

- Location within Osage County and Kansas

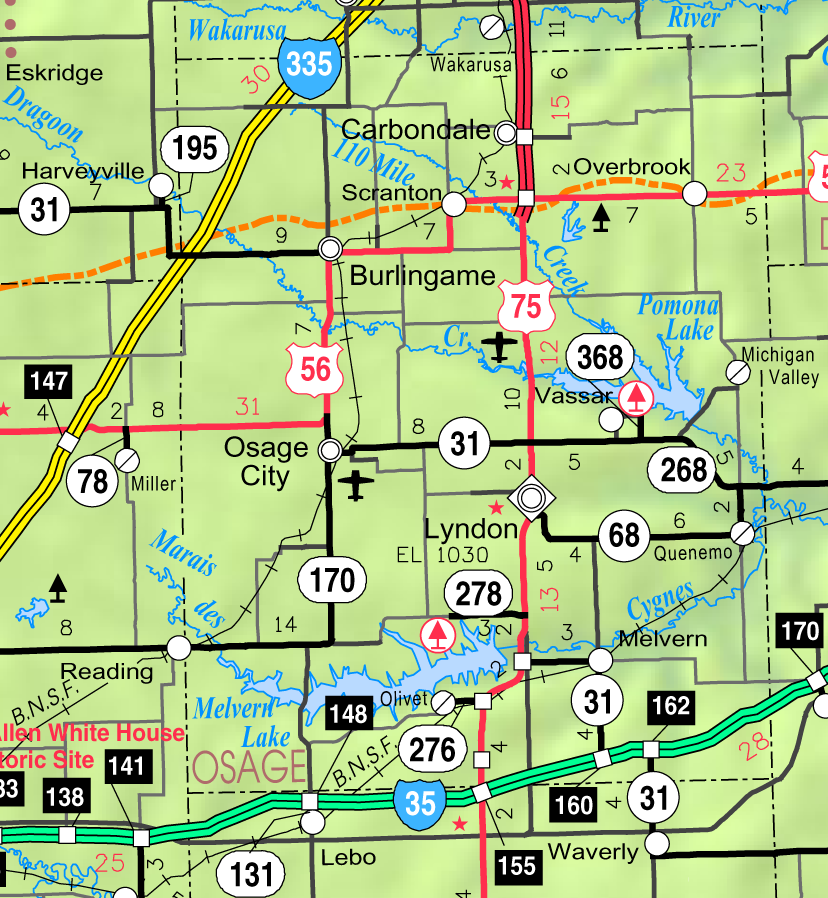
- KDOT map of Osage County (legend)
- Coordinates: 38°45′3″N 95°50′9″W
- Country: United States
- State: Kansas
- County: Osage
- Incorporated: 1861
- Named for: Anson Burlingame

Government
  - Mayor: Michelle Mullinix

Area
  - Total: 0.88 sq mi (2.29 km^{2})
  - Land: 0.88 sq mi (2.29 km^{2})
  - Water: 0 sq mi (0.00 km^{2})
- Elevation: 1,073 ft (327 m)

Population (2020)
  - Total: 971
  - Density: 1,100/sq mi (424/km^{2})
- Time zone: UTC-6 (CST)
  - Summer (DST): UTC-5 (CDT)
- ZIP Code: 66413
- Area code: 785
- FIPS code: 20-09350
- GNIS ID: 479434
- Website: burlingameks.com

Burlingame is a city in Osage County, Kansas, United States. As of the 2020 census, the population of the city was 971.

== History ==
Burlingame was originally established as Council City and was a stop on the Santa Fe Trail. The Council City post office was opened on April 30, 1855. The wide brick main street, Santa Fe Avenue, was built wide enough for an oxen team to be able to make a U-turn. The city and post office name was changed from Council City to Burlingame on January 30, 1858, in honor of Anson Burlingame.

During the Civil War, the townspeople constructed a stone fort in the town center. Burlingame's Fort was torn down after the war.

== Geography ==
Burlingame is located on U.S. Route 56, approximately 20 miles (32 km) south of Topeka. According to the United States Census Bureau, the city has a total area of 0.89 square miles (2.31 km^{2}), all land.

=== Climate ===
The climate in this area is characterized by hot, humid summers and generally mild to cool winters. According to the Köppen Climate Classification system, Burlingame has a humid subtropical climate, abbreviated "Cfa" on climate maps.

== Demographics ==
Historical population
Census	Pop.	Note	%±
1870	655		—
1880	1,370		109.2%
1890	1,472		7.4%
1900	1,436		−2.4%
1910	1,422		−1.0%
1920	1,330		−6.5%
1930	1,127		−15.3%
1940	1,019		−9.6%
1950	1,065		4.5%
1960	1,151		8.1%
1970	999		−13.2%
1980	1,239		24.0%
1990	1,074		−13.3%
2000	1,017		−5.3%
2010	934		−8.2%
2020	971		4.0%
U.S. Decennial Census

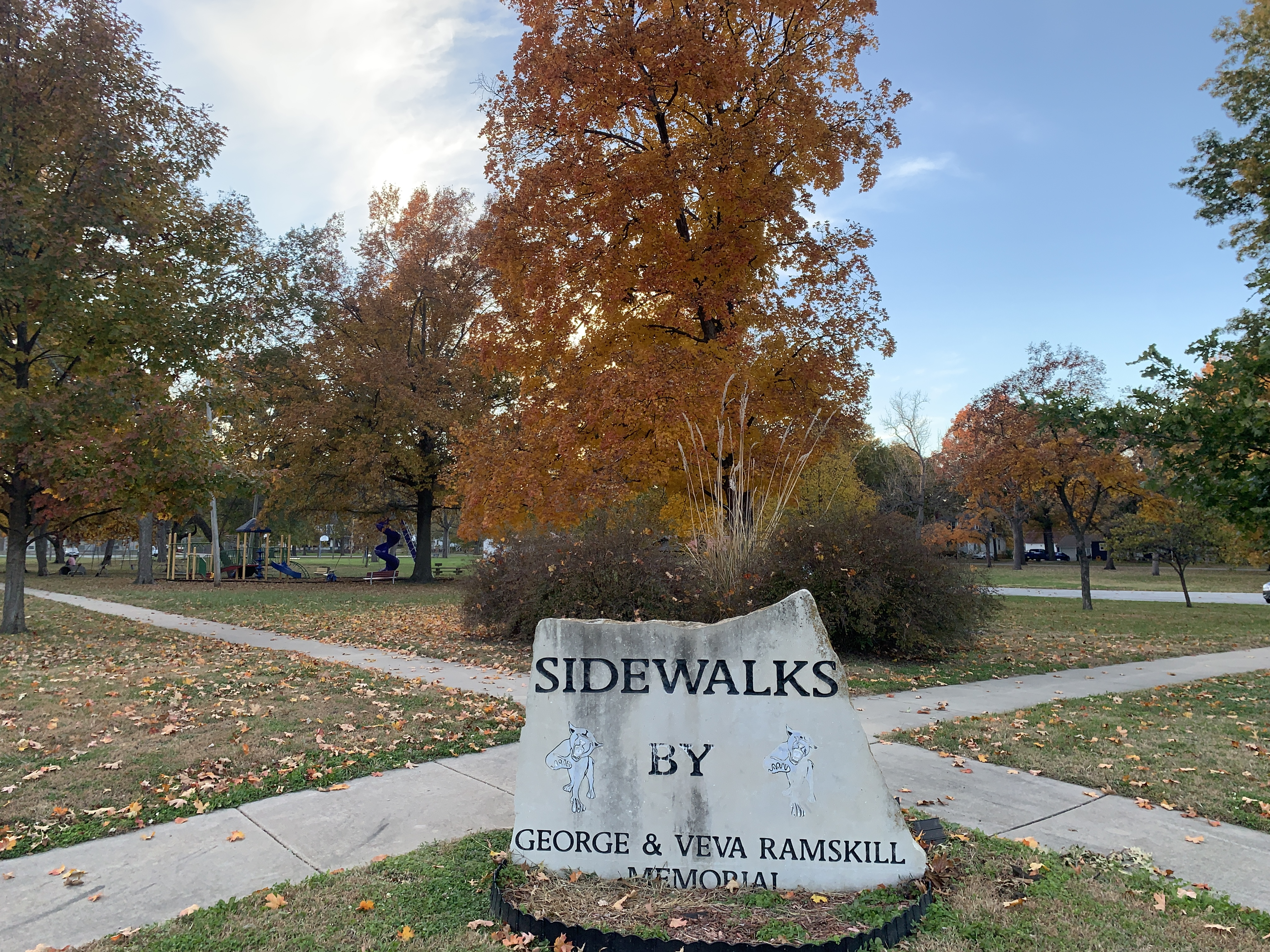
Burlingame City Park (Sumner Park) (2025)

Burlingame is part of the Topeka, Kansas Metropolitan Statistical Area.

=== 2020 census ===
The 2020 United States census counted 971 people, 437 households, and 259 families in Burlingame. The population density was 1,098.4 per square mile (424.1/km^{2}). There were 487 housing units at an average density of 550.9 per square mile (212.7/km^{2}). The racial makeup was 93.92% (912) white or European American (92.38% non-Hispanic white), 0.0% (0) black or African-American, 0.41% (4) Native American or Alaska Native, 0.21% (2) Asian, 0.0% (0) Pacific Islander or Native Hawaiian, 0.41% (4) from other races, and 5.05% (49) from two or more races. Hispanic or Latino of any race was 3.3% (32) of the population.

Of the 437 households, 30.2% had children under the age of 18; 42.8% were married couples living together; 29.1% had a female householder with no spouse or partner present. 34.6% of households consisted of individuals and 17.8% had someone living alone who was 65 years of age or older. The average household size was 1.9 and the average family size was 2.7. The percent of those with a bachelor's degree or higher was estimated to be 9.2% of the population.

25.2% of the population was under the age of 18, 7.7% from 18 to 24, 22.2% from 25 to 44, 24.5% from 45 to 64, and 20.3% who were 65 years of age or older. The median age was 41.0 years. For every 100 females, there were 107.0 males. For every 100 females ages 18 and older, there were 109.8 males.

The 2016–2020 5-year American Community Survey estimates show that the median household income was $41,023 (with a margin of error of +/- $15,423) and the median family income was $52,143 (+/- $13,723). Males had a median income of $42,426 (+/- $3,008) versus $21,850 (+/- $4,368) for females. The median income for those above 16 years old was $33,750 (+/- $12,861). Approximately, 13.1% of families and 16.2% of the population were below the poverty line, including 17.5% of those under the age of 18 and 3.1% of those ages 65 or over.

=== 2010 census ===
As of the census of 2010, there were 934 people, 404 households, and 250 families residing in the city. The population density was 1,049.4 inhabitants per square mile (405.2/km^{2}). There were 501 housing units at an average density of 562.9 per square mile (217.3/km^{2}). The racial makeup of the city was 97.1% White, 0.1% African American, 0.4% Native American, 0.5% from other races, and 1.8% from two or more races. Hispanic or Latino of any race were 1.1% of the population.

There were 404 households, of which 32.9% had children under the age of 18 living with them, 43.1% were married couples living together, 11.6% had a female householder with no husband present, 7.2% had a male householder with no wife present, and 38.1% were non-families. 32.7% of all households were made up of individuals, and 14.8% had someone living alone who was 65 years of age or older. The average household size was 2.31 and the average family size was 2.90.

The median age in the city was 36.9 years. 27.7% of residents were under the age of 18; 7.6% were between the ages of 18 and 24; 23.9% were from 25 to 44; 25.3% were from 45 to 64; and 15.5% were 65 years of age or older. The gender makeup of the city was 47.2% male and 52.8% female.

=== 2000 census ===
As of the census of 2000, there were 1,017 people, 428 households, and 267 families residing in the city. The population density was 1,150.1 inhabitants per square mile (444.1/km^{2}). There were 481 housing units at an average density of 543.9 per square mile (210.0/km^{2}). The racial makeup of the city was 98.43% White, 0.29% African American, 0.10% Native American, 0.49% from other races, and 0.69% from two or more races. Hispanic or Latino of any race were 0.59% of the population.

There were 428 households, out of which 26.4% had children under the age of 18 living with them, 50.7% were married couples living together, 7.7% had a female householder with no husband present, and 37.6% were non-families. 34.3% of all households were made up of individuals, and 21.5% had someone living alone who was 65 years of age or older. The average household size was 2.31 and the average family size was 2.94.

In the city, the population was spread out, with 23.5% under the age of 18, 6.9% from 18 to 24, 24.0% from 25 to 44, 23.1% from 45 to 64, and 22.5% who were 65 years of age or older. The median age was 42 years. For every 100 females, there were 87.3 males. For every 100 females age 18 and over, there were 85.7 males.

The median income for a household in the city was $31,845, and the median income for a family was $42,500. Males had a median income of $26,711 versus $24,250 for females. The per capita income for the city was $17,465. About 3.8% of families and 7.6% of the population were below the poverty line, including 9.9% of those under age 18 and 13.2% of those age 65 or over.

== Government ==
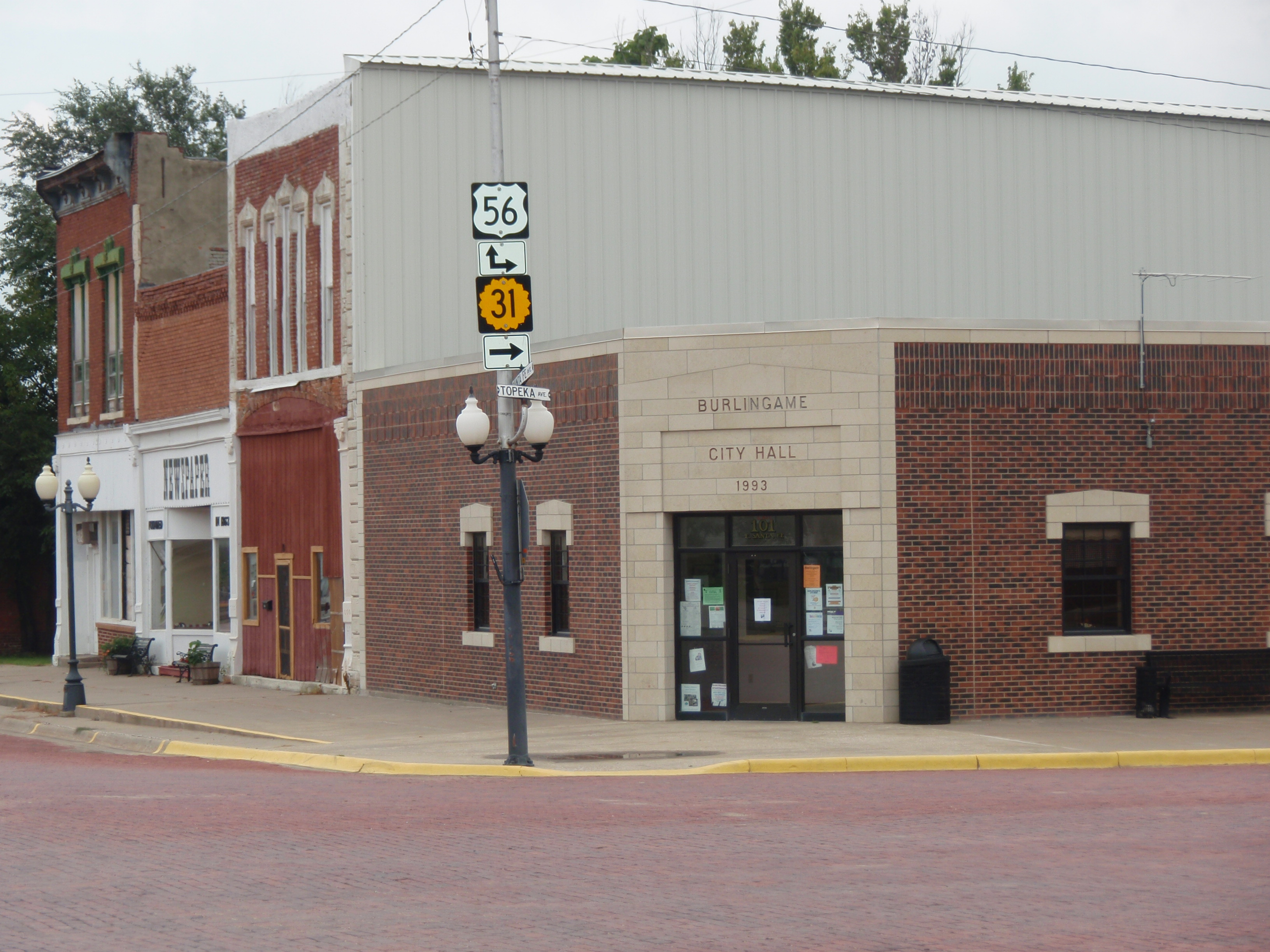
Burlingame City Hall (2009)

The Burlingame government consists of a mayor and five council members. The council meets the 1st and 3rd Monday of each month at 7PM.

- City Hall, 101 E Santa Fe Ave.

== Education ==
=== Primary and secondary education ===
The community is served by Burlingame USD 454 public school district. It operates a high school, junior high, and elementary school. The Burlingame High School mascot is Bearcats.

=== Colleges and universities ===
Allen Community College has maintained a campus in Burlingame since 1991.

== Notable people ==
- Maurice Mehl (1887–1966), paleontologist, was born in Burlingame, Kansas
- Victor Murdock (1871–1945), U.S. Representative from Kansas, Progressive Party presidential nominee, 1916.
- Carla Provost (b. 1970), chief of the Border Patrol
- Kenny Starr (b. 1952), Country and Western singer
- Earl Sutherland, Jr. (1915–1974), winner of the 1971 Nobel Prize in physiology and medicine.
- Ron Thornburgh (b. 1962), former Kansas Secretary of State (1994–2010).
- Muriel Window (1892–1965), vaudeville star, Ziegfeld girl, pilot, businesswoman, born in Burlingame
