= Phill Kline =

American politician

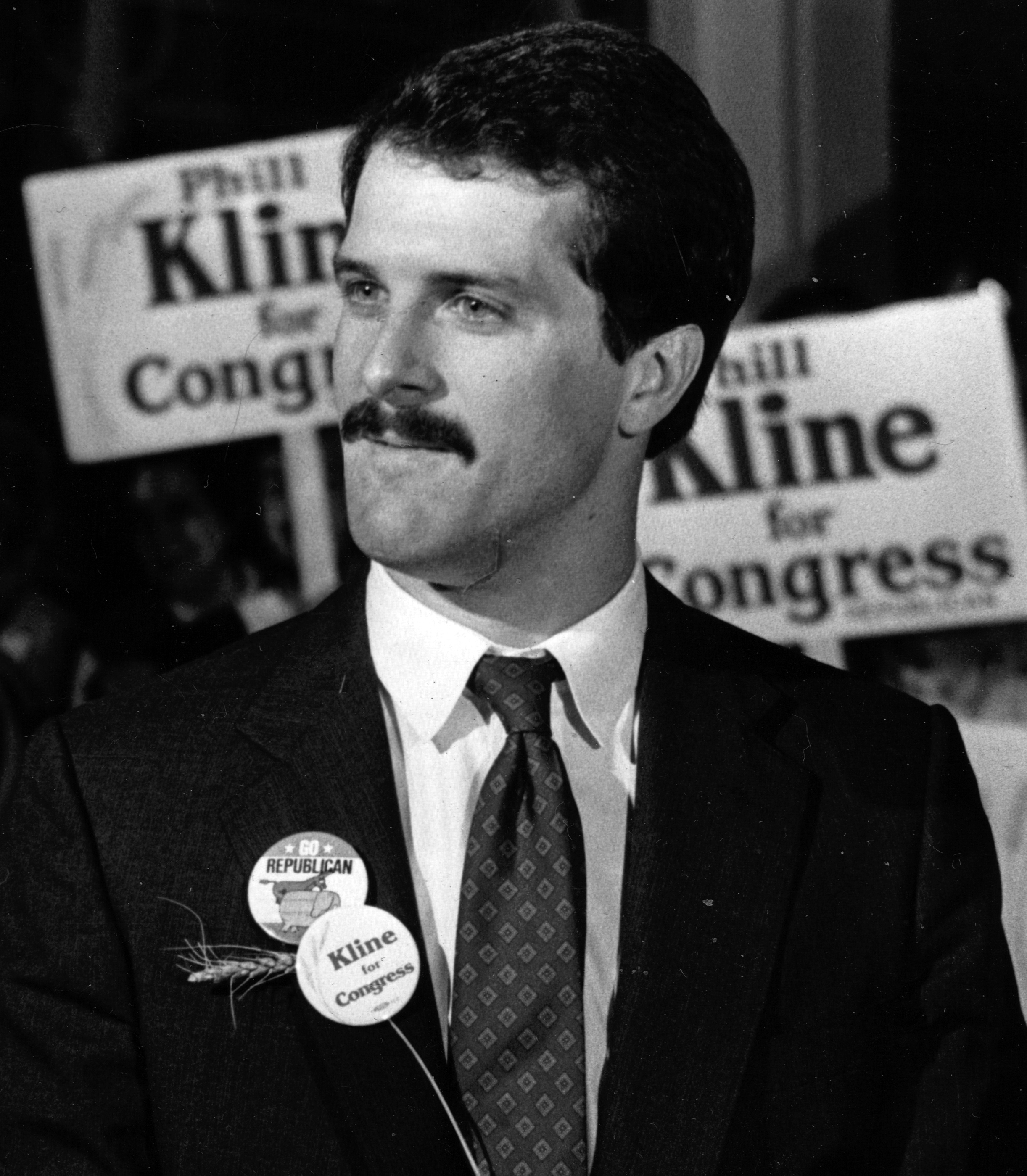
- Phil Kline in 1986

District Attorney of Johnson County, Kansas
- In office January 2007 – January 2009
- Preceded by: Paul J. Morrison
- Succeeded by: Steve Howe

41st Attorney General of Kansas
- In office January 6, 2003 – January 8, 2007
- Governor: Bill Graves; Kathleen Sebelius
- Preceded by: Carla Stovall
- Succeeded by: Paul J. Morrison

Member of the Kansas House of Representatives from the 18th district
- In office January 11, 1993 – January 8, 2001
- Preceded by: Eugene Amos
- Succeeded by: Mary Pilcher-Cook

Personal details
- Born: December 31, 1959 (age 66) Kansas City, Kansas, U.S.
- Party: Republican
- Spouse: Deborah Kline
- Profession: Attorney (license indefinitely suspended)

Phillip D. Kline (born December 31, 1959) is a former American attorney who served as a Kansas state legislator, district attorney of Johnson County, and Kansas attorney general. Kline, a member of the Republican Party, lost re-election as attorney general to Democratic challenger Paul J. Morrison in 2006. Kline was appointed by the Republican County Central Committee to fill the vacancy left by Morrison's election as Kansas attorney general, becoming district attorney of Johnson County on the day he left office as attorney general and essentially switching jobs with Morrison. Kline then ran for a full term as district attorney, but was defeated in the 2008 Republican primary.

Kline was a polarizing figure in state politics, largely surrounding his use of his office to investigate abortion providers. He filed charges against George Tiller, a late-term abortion provider, and led a years-long effort to prosecute Planned Parenthood in Kansas. Kline received a series of official rebukes and reprimands for his legal tactics against abortion providers, and in 2013, his law license was indefinitely suspended by the Kansas Supreme Court, which found "clear and convincing evidence" that Kline committed numerous violations of conduct rules, which included providing false testimony. Kline appealed his license suspension to the U.S. Supreme Court, which declined to intervene, leaving the suspension in place. Kline is currently an assistant professor at Liberty University, an evangelical Christian college in Lynchburg, Virginia.

== Early life and political career ==
Born in Kansas City, Kansas, Kline grew up in Shawnee, a community on the Kansas side of the Kansas City Metropolitan Area. He was the third of five children; his father abandoned the family when Kline was five years old, leaving his mother to be a single parent.

Kline graduated from Shawnee Mission Northwest High School and subsequently attended the University of Central Missouri in Warrensburg, Missouri. He was a member of the varsity wrestling team with a partial wrestling scholarship, and a member of the cross country team. He earned a B.S. in business communications in 1982.

Kline received his J.D. from the University of Kansas School of Law in 1987, and was an associate editor for the Kansas Law Review. He entered private practice as an associate with Blackwell Sanders, a large firm in Kansas City specializing in corporate law. He married his wife, Deborah, in 1989, and settled in Shawnee close to where he grew up. The Klines have one daughter, Jacqueline Hillary (Timmer), born in 1992. They are members of the Central Church of the Nazarene in Lenexa, Kansas.

After leaving Blackwell Sanders, Kline hosted two radio programs: The Phill and Mary Show on Kansas City AM station KMBZ, and Face Off With Phill Kline on Topeka AM station WIBW. He was finance director of the Johnson County Republican Committee.

While still a law student, Kline ran for U.S. Congress in 1986. He won the Republican primary election but was defeated in the general election by the incumbent, Democrat Jim Slattery. In 1992, Kline won election to the Kansas House of Representatives, where he represented the 18th District. which included Shawnee. There, he chaired the House Appropriations Committee and was a member of several oversight committees. He was a member of the advisory committee for Kansas senator Bob Dole's 1996 presidential campaign. Kline remained in the Kansas House until 2000, when he ran for election to the United States House of Representatives, seeking the Third District seat held by Democratic Congressman Dennis Moore. Although Kline won the Republican primary, he lost the general election to Moore, 184,050 to 145,542 votes, 54.8% to 43.3%.

== Attorney General of Kansas ==
In 2002, Kline won election as attorney general of Kansas, defeating fellow Republican David Adkins of Leawood in the primary and Democrat Chris Biggs of Junction City in the general election. On becoming attorney general, Kline and his family moved to Topeka.

=== Kansas v. Marsh ===
In December 2005 and April 2006, he successfully argued before the Supreme Court of the United States in Kansas v. Marsh, wherein the Court reversed a ruling made by the Kansas Supreme Court that the state's death penalty was unconstitutional.

=== Abortion controversy ===
In 2005, Kline began investigating possible cases of child rape and illegal partial-birth and late-term abortions. In doing so, Kline requested the redacted medical records (without names) of 90 women and girls who either gave birth to a child or had an abortion. His office was ultimately granted these redacted records by the Kansas Supreme Court.

On December 21, 2006, Kline charged abortion provider Dr. George Tiller with more than 30 misdemeanors, most involving abortions Tiller allegedly performed on minors. But just hours after the charges were unsealed, a Sedgwick County judge threw them out "at the request of Sedgwick County District Attorney Nola Foulston, who said her office had not been consulted by Kline." However, on June 28, 2007, a 19-count indictment was unexpectedly filed against Tiller by Kline's successor, Paul J. Morrison. On March 27, 2009, Dr. Tiller was found not guilty of all 19 misdemeanor charges stemming from some abortions he performed at his Wichita clinic in 2003. Despite the acquittal, Tiller was charged on December 12, 2008, by the Kansas Board of Healing Arts (KBHA) on 11 counts of illegal late-term abortions. On May 31, 2009, while serving as an usher at his church's Sunday morning services, Tiller was assassinated by Scott Roeder, an Operation Rescue West (ORW) member who had the cell phone number of ORW staff member and convicted clinic arsonist Cheryl Sullenger, on a post-it note on his dashboard when he was apprehended fleeing, a few hours after the murder.

In a related matter, Kline was named a defendant in a suit brought in the United States District Court for the District of Kansas challenging a state law requiring "doctors and other professionals" to report "all consensual underage sexual activity as sexual abuse." On April 18, 2006, Judge J. Thomas Marten agreed and issued a permanent injunction, ruling that such a policy violated the children's rights to informational privacy and could not be justified by Kansas law.

In 2006, Kline and Operation Rescue claimed that Robert A. Estrada, an alleged rapist, was captured with the help of abortion clinic medical records subpoenaed as a result of Kline's investigation. The district attorney who prosecuted Estrada challenged ORW's claims, stating that Kline and the records had no involvement in the prosecution.

Kline was suspended from practicing law due to the fact that he illegally accessed the private medical records of women who made the choice to have an abortion. He obtained some records provided on his demand to Dr. Kristin Neuhaus, whose prosecution he pursued after Dr. Tiller's assassination, and illegally disclosed them, including discussing them with then-Fox News host Bill O'Reilly on television. The Kansas Supreme Court stated:

"Ultimately, we unanimously conclude the weight of the aggravating factors—i.e., Kline's inability or refusal to acknowledge the line between overzealous advocacy and operating within the bounds of the law and his professional obligations; his selfish motives; and his lengthy and substantial pattern of misconduct—weigh more heavily than the mitigating factors and merit his indefinite suspension."

=== State v. Limon ===
During his tenure, in the case of State v. Limon, Kline defended a Kansas law which provided substantially higher sentencing guidelines for acts of homosexual statutory rape compared to equivalent heterosexual acts. A Kansas trial court upheld the law, the Kansas Court of Appeals affirmed that decision, and the Supreme Court of Kansas declined to hear the case. The party challenging the law was barely 18 at the time of the offense, and both Limon and the other boy were residents of a home for the mentally disabled. Kline had repeatedly referred to the older boy as a "predator." His counsel applied to the Supreme Court of the United States for a writ of certiorari.

In June 2003, the Supreme Court issued a GVR Order, remanding the case for reconsideration in light of the Supreme Court's then-recent decision in Lawrence v. Texas, which held that a similar Texas law violated the Equal Protection Clause of the 14th Amendment. The attorney general's office continued to pursue the matter, seeking to distinguish the Kansas law from the Texas law. The Kansas Court of Appeals upheld the earlier decision 2-1, but the Kansas Supreme Court ruled unanimously in favor of Limon and overturned his conviction in 2005. By the time of his release, he had served 5 1/2 years of a seventeen-year sentence. If the participants had been of opposite sexes, the maximum sentence for the older one would have only been 15 months.

=== 2006 and 2008 re-election campaigns ===
Kline ran for re-election as attorney general in 2006. On November 7, 2006, he lost to Democratic challenger and Johnson County District Attorney Paul J. Morrison. Kline received 41 percent of the vote. To oppose Kline in the general election, Morrison had changed his political affiliation from Republican to Democratic in the fall of 2005.

On December 11, 2006, Johnson County Republican Precinct committeepersons narrowly selected Kline over fellow Republican Steve Howe to serve the remaining two years of Morrison's term as county district attorney. With 60% of the vote, Howe defeated Kline in the August 5, 2008, Republican primary for a full term as district attorney.

==== Church memorandum controversy ====
In late September 2006, an internal election campaign memo from Kline to his campaign staff was leaked to The Interfaith Alliance and quickly was picked up by bloggers, resulting in much discussion and controversy. In the memo, Kline tells his staff how to form a campaign committee for him at each church that will educate and register voters, "encourage people to contribute and volunteer," and network with their own email lists. Kline has defended the memo and the mobilization of churches it calls for, insisting it does not violate IRS regulations governing the tax-exempt status of churches, under which a church stands to lose its tax-exempt status for officially supporting a political candidate, if the commissioner of Internal Revenue so determines.

== Work attendance and residency controversy ==
KCTV, a Kansas City CBS affiliate, aired an investigative report that addressed accusations that Kline did not reside within Johnson County as required by state law, and that he spent an inadequate amount of time at the district attorney's office. He had rented a small apartment in Stilwell, and was registered to vote from that location. The KCTV reporters said in their report they were unable to observe Kline or his family at the address. On two occasions, Kline was tailed by reporters from Johnson County back to Topeka, the location of his primary residence.

The Johnson County Sheriff's Office initially refused KCTV-5 access to records that log ID card passes at the Johnson County Courthouse garage, citing security concerns. Through a public records request, KCTV initially received redacted and incomplete records via the Johnson County Sheriff's Office. According to the report, the security system only saves 90 days worth of data and purged much of the electronic records in question. The KCTV report, based on the incomplete records, also suggested that Kline spent an inadequate amount of time in the Johnson Country District Attorney's Office, averaging only 29 hours per week. KCTV5 devoted an entire 10pm newscast to deal with criticisms leveled at KCTV5's handling of the investigation the following day.

== Post-electoral career ==
In January, 2009, Kline left Kansas to become a visiting professor at the Liberty University School of Law, in Lynchburg, Virginia. He is now an assistant professor at the school.

=== License to practice law suspended ===
In 2010 the Kansas Supreme Court Disciplinary Administrator brought formal professional ethics charges against Kline before the Kansas Supreme Court based on perjury, an illegal file transfer, misleading legal guidance that Kline had provided to the grand jury in the Johnson County clinic case, the O'Reilly appearance, and several other matters. Kline's ethics trial began on February 21, 2011. He testified that he had the right to deceive state agencies to gain information in abortion investigations and that he had no duty to promptly notify a trial judge that he had provided flawed information.

On October 13, 2011, the Kansas Board of Discipline of Attorneys recommended that Kline's law license be indefinitely suspended, citing a pattern of repeatedly misleading statements, "dishonest and selfish motives", and a failure to "take any responsibility for his misconduct." Kline disputed the board's findings as politically motivated. The recommendation to suspend his license went to the state's Supreme Court, where Kline's demands resulted in the unusual recusal of five Justices and a substitute appeals court judge from the case. The court indefinitely suspended Kline's law license on October 18, 2013. The costs to the taxpayers of defending his license came to nearly $600,000.

The United States Supreme Court – the only level of federal court which could overrule the state supreme court decision – announced on April 28, 2014, that it was declining to hear Kline's request to review the suspension of his Kansas license to practice law. However, Kline continued to pursue the matter as a federal case, in federal District court, where he lost in 2016. He then appealed that decision to the 10th U.S. Circuit Court of Appeals in Denver — losing again, July 3, 2017, by the decision of a three-judge panel who refused to allow the case to be reopened in federal court.

Party political offices
Preceded by Carla Stovall	Republican nominee for Kansas Attorney General; 2002, 2006	Succeeded by Derek Schmidt
Kansas House of Representatives
Preceded by Eugene Amos	Member of the Kansas House of Representatives from the 18th district 1993–2001	Succeeded by Mary Pilcher-Cook
Legal offices
Preceded by Carla Stovall	Attorney General of Kansas; 2003–2007	Succeeded by Paul J. Morrison
Preceded by Paul J. Morrison	District Attorney of Johnson County, Kansas; 2007–2009	Succeeded by Steve Howe
