= Burlingame High School (Kansas) =

Burlingame Junior-Senior High School

Location
- 417 N Dacotah Street; Burlingame, Kansas 66413; United States; 38°45′27.2592″N 95°50′12.8148″W

Information
- Funding type: Public
- Status: Open
- School board: BOE website
- School district: Burlingame USD 454
- Superintendent: Marcy Cassidy
- Principal: Taylor Montgomery
- Teaching staff: 12.20 (FTE)
- Grades: 7-12
- Gender: coed
- Enrollment: 149 (2023–2024)
- Student to teacher ratio: 12.21
- Schedule type: Traditional
- Colors: Purple; White
- Athletics: Yes
- Athletics conference: Lyon County League
- Sports: Basketball, Cheerleading, Cross Country, Football, Golf, Track and Field, Volleyball
- Mascot: Bearcat
- Nickname: Burlingame Bearcats
- Newspaper: The Bearcat Pause
- Affiliations: KSHSAA
- Website: Burlingame Schools

Burlingame Junior-Senior High School is a fully accredited public high school located in Burlingame, Kansas, in the Burlingame USD 454 school district, serving students in grades 7-12. Burlingame has an enrollment of approximately 171 students. The principal is Taylor Montgomery. The school mascot is the Bearcat and the school colors are purple and white.

== Extracurricular activities ==
The Bearcats compete in the Lyon County League. The KSHSAA classification is 2A, the second lowest class. The school also has a variety of organizations for the students to participate in.

=== Athletics ===
The Bearcats compete in the Lyon County League and are classified as 2A the second lowest classification in Kansas according to KSHSAA. A majority of the sports are coached by the same coaches. Burlingame Junior-Senior High School offers the following sports:

Fall Sports

- Cheerleading
- Boys' Cross-Country
- Girls' Cross-Country
- Football
- Volleyball

Winter

- Boys' Basketball
- Girls' Basketball
- Cheerleading
- Wrestling

Spring

- Baseball
- Golf
- Softball
- Boys' Track and Field
- Girls' Track and Field

=== Organizations ===
- Band
- Future Business Leaders of America (FBLA)
- KAY Club
- National Honor Society (NHS)
- Scholars Bowl
- Student Council (StuCo)

== Carla Provost, Chief of U.S. Border Patrol, 2017-2020 ==
- Ron Thornburgh, Kansas Secretary of State, 1995-2010

== See also ==
- List of high schools in Kansas
- List of unified school districts in Kansas
