= Carla Stovall =

American politician (born 1957)

40th Kansas Attorney General
- In office January 9, 1995 – January 13, 2003
- Governor: Bill Graves
- Preceded by: Robert Stephan
- Succeeded by: Phill Kline

Personal details
- Born: March 18, 1957 (age 69) Hardtner, Kansas, U.S.
- Party: Republican
- Education: Pittsburg State University; University of Kansas

Carla J. Stovall (born March 18, 1957, Hardtner, Kansas), also known as Carla Stovall Steckline, is a Republican politician from Marion, Kansas who served as attorney general of the State of Kansas from 1995 to 2003. During her tenure, she also served as president of the National Association of Attorneys General.

== Early life and education ==
Stovall, from rural Marion County, Kansas, is the daughter of Carl and Juanita Stovall. In 1975, she graduated from Marion High School. In 1979, she graduated from Pittsburg State University with a social science degree, and, in 1982, from the University of Kansas School of Law with a Juris Doctor degree.

Her law career started in 1982 at a private law practice in Pittsburg, Kansas.

== Political career ==
=== Early government career ===
A Republican, in 1985, Stovall was elected Crawford County attorney, serving until 1988, and served as a member of Kansas Parole Board (which she eventually chaired).

=== Kansas attorney general ===
Stovall was elected attorney general of the State of Kansas in 1994, serving from 1995 to 2003. In 1998, she was re-elected with 75% of the vote.

Among her most noted activities were her work against sex offenders (advocating for stricter sex-crime laws, and more severe punishment for convicted offenders) and against the tobacco industry (particularly as it affected children).

==== Tobacco battles ====
In 1996, Stovall sued the tobacco industry—the 11th state attorney general to do so, and one of the nation's first Republican AGs to file suit against the tobacco industry. The largest settlement in all her cases as A.G. was a $1.6 billion judgment against the tobacco industry, and an injunction ordering large tobacco companies to stop marketing their products to children.

Some controversy arose in Stovall's handling of the tobacco case, when she hired her former law firm, Entz & Chanay, to serve as "local counsel" during the state's settlement negotiations with the tobacco defendants, despite their lack of experience in tobacco litigation. Her local colleagues subsequently made donations to Stovall's campaign. After the courts awarded lawyers for Kansas $54 million, Stovall (by then no longer Kansas attorney general) was summoned before a legislative committee to explain why her former law firm had gotten half of the money ($27 million).

In 1999, Stovall was among the founding board members of the American Legacy Foundation, an organization formed to reduce teen tobacco use and warn all people of tobacco-related disease (particularly through their familiar "truth" campaign). Stovall also pushed for tobacco prevention measures as a member of the Kansas Children's Cabinet (a board advising the Kansas Legislature on how to spend money from tobacco lawsuit settlements).

=== National Association of Attorneys General ===
During her tenure as Kansas attorney general, she served as president of the National Association of Attorneys General from 2001 to 2002.

== 2002 gubernatorial race ==
During the 2002 election, Stovall briefly campaigned for the Republican nomination for the office of governor of Kansas. Kent Glasscock, a former speaker of the Kansas House of Representatives, served as her running mate.

In 2001, Kansas Republican party moderates had united behind Stovall for the gubernatorial race, in hopes of defeating the conservative wing of the party in a one-on-one contest with its standard-bearer, State Treasurer Tim Shallenburger. However, the late entry of former Wichita mayor Bob Knight complicated matters.

Initially, Stovall was one of the presumed "front-runner" candidates, and her anticipated run against the probable Democratic nominee, Kansas Insurance Commissioner Kathleen Sebelius, drew national attention as becoming possibly a rare "woman-vs.-woman" gubernatorial race.

Though the front-runner among moderate candidates — and confident that she would win if she stayed in the race — Stovall dropped out in April, 2002, citing a lack of enthusiasm for campaigning, and for the job of governor, and announced plans to marry Kansas media mogul Larry Steckline, whom she married in August.

Stovall's abrupt withdrawal threw the moderate wing of the Kansas Republican Party into chaos, as they scrambled to replace her. Kent Glasscock, her running mate, was the heir-apparent, and claimed entitlement to Stovall's campaign funds, but opponent Shallenburger, the incumbent State Treasurer, argued that the funds—per his interpretation of state law—had to be returned to the state Republican party, or to the donors, a charity, or the state government's general revenue fund. Additional Republican candidates began to emerge, further complicating the race. Glasscock ultimately became a running mate for gubernatorial candidate Bob Knight.

Stovall's withdrawal was credited with giving advantage to the Democratic nominee (and ultimate victor), Katheleen Sebelius.

== Post-political life ==
Stovall abandoned her gubernatorial candidacy, abruptly retiring from politics, married Kansas media mogul Larry Steckline, and settled into domestic family life. She became legal counsel for some of Steckline's enterprises, and hosted Fox Consumer Report on KSAS-TV (Wichita), and a consumer-education program on KFTI radio (Wichita). With Steckline, she acquired and operated a dinner cruise boat, the Cherokee Queens, on Grand Lake O' the Cherokees, near Grove, Oklahoma.

== Awards and recognition ==
- 1996: Distinguished Service to Children Award, Kansas Children's Service League
- 1998 Alumnus of the Year Award, Leadership Kansas (political orientation program of the Kansas Chamber of Commerce)
- 2001: Kelley-Wyman award for outstanding attorney general, National Association of Attorneys General, during the first year of her term as the organization's president
- 2002: Champion Award, the Campaign for Tobacco-Free Kids

Party political offices
Preceded by Robert Stephan	Republican nominee for Kansas Attorney General; 1994, 1998	Succeeded by Phill Kline
Legal offices
Preceded by Robert Stephan	Attorney General of Kansas; 1995–2003	Succeeded by Phill Kline
