= Kansas Attorney General =

Attorney general for the U.S. state of Kansas

Attorney General of of Kansas
- Seal of the attorney general of Kansas

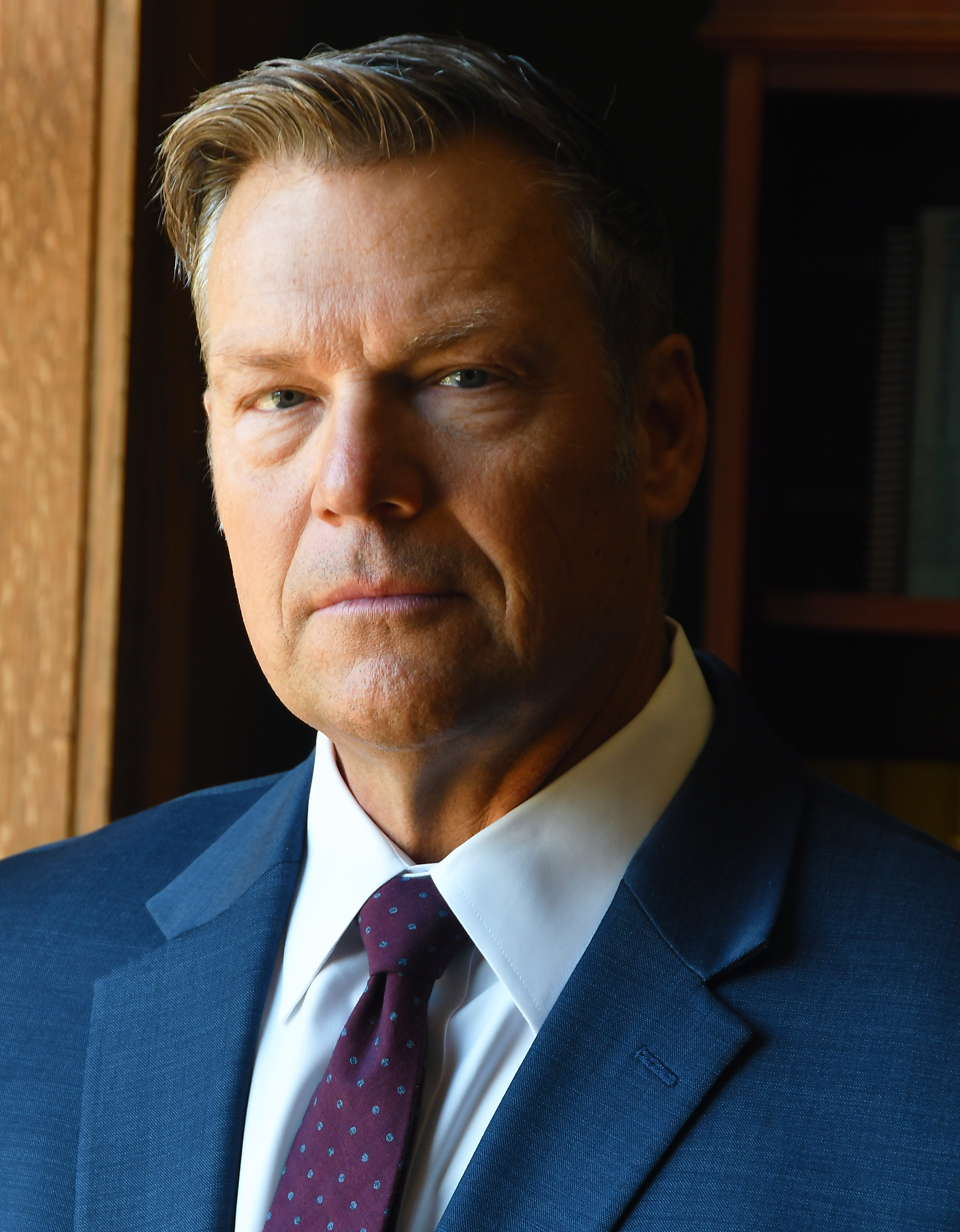
- Incumbent; Kris Kobach since January 9, 2023
- Inaugural holder: Andrew Jackson Isacks
- Formation: June 30, 1854
- Succession: Fifth
- Website: www.ag.ks.gov

The attorney general of Kansas is a statewide elected official responsible for providing legal services to the state government of Kansas. Kris Kobach assumed the office on January 9, 2023.

== Divisions ==
- Administration Division
- Civil Division
- Criminal Division
- Kansas Bureau of Investigation
- Office of the Medicaid Inspector General
- Office of the Solicitor General
- Public Protection Division
- Special Litigation & Constitutional Issues Division
- Victim Services Division
- Youth Services Division

== Officeholders ==
=== Kansas Territory attorneys general ===
Name	Term	Party
Andrew Jackson Isacks	1854–1857	
William Weer	1857–1858	
Alson C. Davis	1858–1861	

=== State attorneys general ===
Image	Name	Term	Party
	Benjamin Franklin Simpson	1861	Republican
	Charles Chadwick	1861	Republican
	Samuel Adams Stinson	1861–1863	Democratic
	Warren William Guthrie	1863–1865	Republican
	Jerome D. Brumbaugh	1865–1867	Republican
	George Henry Hoyt	1867–1869	Republican
	Addison Danford	1869–1871	Republican
	Archibald L. Williams	1871–1875	Republican
	Asa Maxson Fitz Randolph	1875–1877	Republican
	Willard Davis	1877–1881	Republican
	William Agnew Johnston	1881–1884	Republican
	George Price Smith	1884–1885	Democratic
	Simeon Briggs Bradford	1885–1889	Republican
	Lyman Beecher Kellogg	1889–1891	Republican
	John Nutt Ives	1891–1893	Democratic
	John Thomas Little	1893–1895	Populist
	Fernando Brenton Dawes	1895–1897	Republican
	Louis C. Boyle	1897–1899	Populist
	Aretas Allen Godard	1899–1903	Republican
	Chiles Crittendon Coleman	1903–1907	Republican
	Fred Schuyler Jackson	1907–1911	Republican
	John Shaw Dawson	1911–1915	Republican
	Sardius Mason Brewster	1915–1919	Republican
	Richard Joseph Hopkins	1919–1923	Republican
	Charles Benjamin Griffith	1923–1927	Republican
	William A. Smith	1927–1930	Republican
	Roland Boynton	1930–1935	Republican
	Clarence Victor Beck	1935–1939	Republican
	Jay S. Parker	1939–1943	Republican
	Alexander Baldwin Mitchell	1943–1947	Republican
	Edward F. Arn	1947–1949	Republican
	Harold Ralph Fatzer	1949–1956	Republican
	John Anderson Jr.	1956–1961	Republican
	William M. Ferguson	1961–1965	Republican
	Robert C. Londerholm	1965–1969	Republican
	Kent Frizzell	1969–1971	Republican
	Vern Miller	1971–1975	Democratic
	Curt T. Schneider	1975–1979	Democratic
	Robert Stephan	1979–1995	Republican
	Carla J. Stovall	1995–2003	Republican
	Phill Kline	2003–2007	Republican
	Paul J. Morrison	2007–2008	Democratic
	Stephen Six	2008–2011	Democratic
	Derek Schmidt	2011–2023	Republican
	Kris Kobach	2023–present	Republican
