= Kris Kobach =

American lawyer and politician (born 1966)

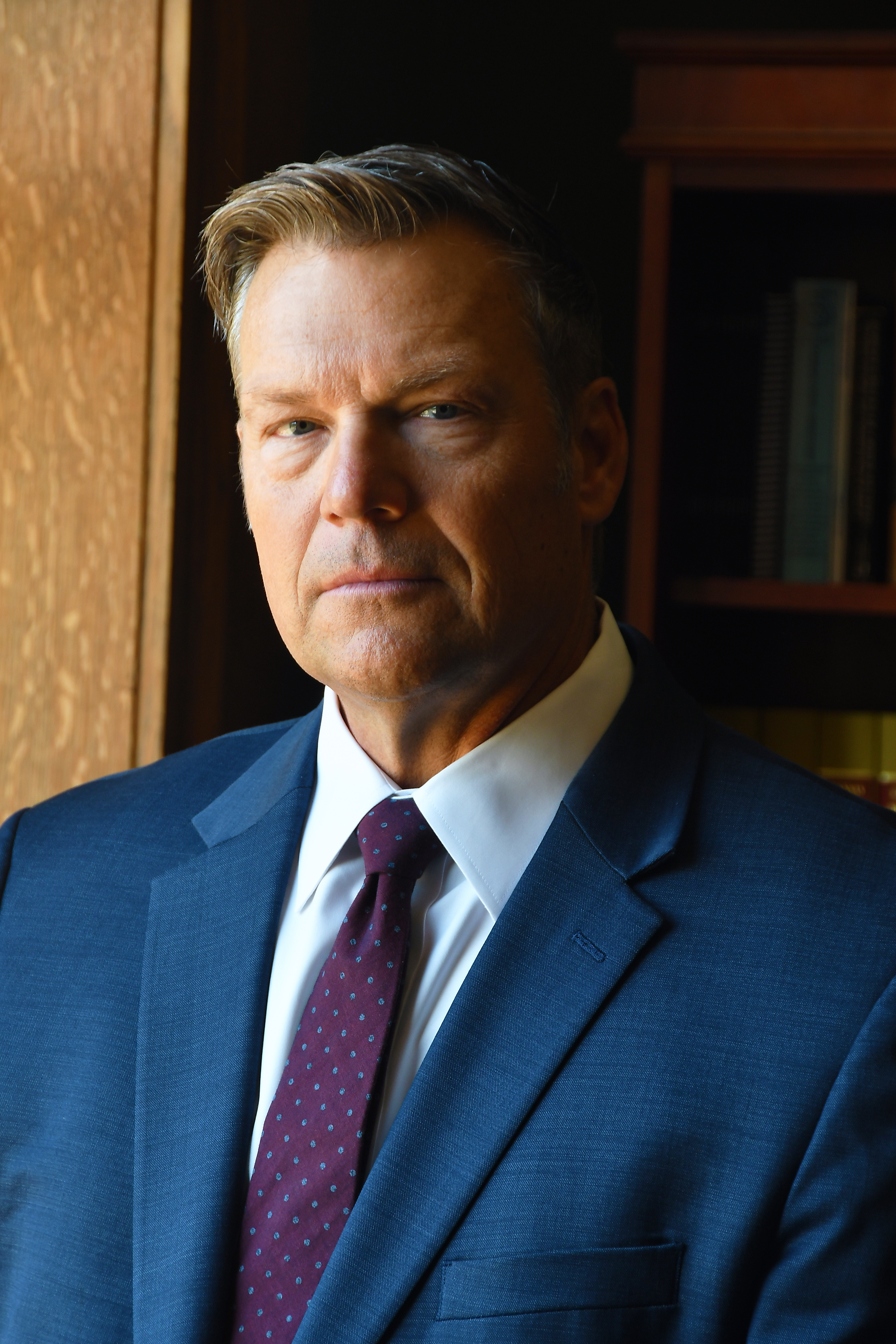
- Kobach in 2024

45th Attorney General of Kansas
- Incumbent
- Assumed office January 9, 2023
- Governor: Laura Kelly
- Preceded by: Derek Schmidt
- Succeeded by: Chris Mann (elect)

31st Secretary of State of Kansas
- In office January 10, 2011 – January 14, 2019
- Governor: Sam Brownback; Jeff Colyer
- Preceded by: Chris Biggs
- Succeeded by: Scott Schwab

64th Chair of the Kansas Republican Party
- In office January 28, 2007 – January 31, 2009
- Preceded by: Tim Shallenburger
- Succeeded by: Amanda Adkins

Personal details
- Born: Kris William Kobach; March 26, 1966 (age 60) Madison, Wisconsin, U.S.
- Party: Republican
- Spouse: Heather Mannschreck (m. 2001)
- Children: 5
- Education: Harvard University (BA); Brasenose College, Oxford (MPhil, DPhil); Yale University (JD)
- Website: Campaign website
- Kobach's voice Kobach's opening statements on the Presidential Advisory Commission on Election Integrity. Recorded July 24, 2017

Kris William Kobach (/ˈkoʊbɑːk/ KOH-bahk; born March 26, 1966) is an American lawyer and politician who has served as the attorney general of Kansas since 2023. He previously served as the 31st secretary of state of Kansas from 2011 to 2019. Kobach rose to national prominence as a hardliner on immigration, including his involvement in implementing high-profile ordinances targeting illegal immigration in various American cities.

Raised in Topeka, Kansas, he earned degrees from Harvard University, the University of Oxford, and Yale Law School before working as a law professor and serving in the U.S. Department of Justice. After an unsuccessful congressional campaign in 2004, Kobach was later elected chairman of the Kansas Republican Party in 2007, serving until January 2009. He was elected secretary of state in 2010, and re-elected in 2014. He was a candidate for governor of Kansas in 2018, defeating Jeff Colyer—who had recently become governor after Sam Brownback's resignation—in a close Republican primary, but losing in the November general election to Democrat Laura Kelly 48.01%–42.98%–6.50% in a three-way race with independent candidate Greg Orman.

He later ran unsuccessfully for U.S. Senate in 2020, placing second in the Republican primary. He returned to elected office after being elected Attorney General of Kansas in 2022. He ran for reelection in 2026, but lost to Democrat Chris Mann.

== Early life, education, and academic career ==
Kobach was born in Madison, Wisconsin, on March 26, 1966. His family moved to Topeka, Kansas, when he was seven years old, where his father owned a Buick dealership, that Kobach worked at while in high school. In 1984, Kobach graduated from Washburn Rural High School in Topeka, Kansas, where he was co-valedictorian, and the student body class president.

He earned his Bachelor of Arts degree in Government from Harvard University, graduating summa cum laude and first in his department. Kobach was also elected to Phi Beta Kappa. The director of Harvard's Center for International Affairs, Professor Samuel P. Huntington, was Kobach's faculty advisor from 1984 to 1988. Huntington believed that migration, especially from Mexico and Latin America, represented the most perilous threat to what he called the "American identity". When Kobach taught law at the University of Missouri–Kansas City, Huntington's writings were required reading in the course.

From Harvard, Kobach went on to earn a Doctor of Philosophy in politics from Brasenose College of Oxford University, having been selected for a Marshall Scholarship. Returning to the U.S., he earned a J.D. from Yale Law School in 1995, and became an editor of The Yale Law Journal. During this time, Kobach published two books: The Referendum: Direct Democracy in Switzerland (Dartmouth, 1994), and Political Capital: The Motives, Tactics, and Goals of Politicized Businesses in South Africa (University Press of America, 1990).

== Legal career ==
From 1995 to 1996, Kobach clerked for Judge Deanell R. Tacha of the Tenth Circuit Court of Appeals in Lawrence, Kansas. He began his professorship at the University of Missouri–Kansas City School of Law (UMKC) shortly thereafter. In 2001, President George W. Bush awarded him a White House Fellowship to work for Attorney General John Ashcroft. At the end of the fellowship, he stayed on as counsel to the attorney general. Shortly after the attacks of September 11, 2001, he led a team of attorneys and researchers who formulated and established the National Security Entry-Exit Registration System. In addition, he took part in work to reshape the Board of Immigration Appeals in 2002. After his government service ended, he returned to UMKC to teach law until he was elected Kansas Secretary of State.

== Immigration-related activism ==
=== Litigation ===
While running for Congress in 2004, Kobach represented out-of-state students on behalf of the Federation for American Immigration Reform (FAIR), in a lawsuit against the state of Kansas, challenging a state law which grants in-state tuition to illegal immigrants. The suit was dismissed for lack of legal standing for the plaintiffs. In 2005, Kobach filed a lawsuit on behalf of FAIR's Immigration Reform Law Institute (IRLI), challenging a similar law in California. In September 2008, the California Court of Appeal held that California's law granting in-state tuition rates to illegal immigrants was preempted by federal law. (Martinez v. Regents, 166 Cal. App. 4th 1121; 2008). In November 2010, the California Supreme Court unanimously reversed, finding that the law was not so preempted, because it was based on attendance for three years and graduation from a California high school.

In 2010, Kobach filed a third similar tuition lawsuit, this time in Nebraska. The case was dismissed in a Nebraska district court in December of that year, for plaintiffs' lack of legal standing.

Kobach has litigated numerous lawsuits defending cities and states that adopt laws to discourage illegal immigration. He served as lead lawyer defending the city of Valley Park, Missouri in a federal case concerning an ordinance that requires businesses to use a federal worker verification program known as E-Verify in order to maintain a business license. The ordinance was upheld by Missouri federal judge E. Richard Webber on January 31, 2008 (Gray v. Valley Park, 2008 U.S. Dist. LEXIS 7238). The American Civil Liberties Union (ACLU), representing the plaintiff, appealed the case to the Eighth Circuit Court of Appeals. Kobach prevailed on appeal, and the Court allowed the Valley Park ordinance to stand (Gray v. Valley Park, 567 F.3d 976 (8th Cir. 2009)), saying that the ordinance "addresses the employment of illegal aliens, not Hispanics."

Kobach was the lead attorney defending the city of Hazleton, Pennsylvania, whose ordinances prohibiting employing and renting to illegal immigrants had been struck down by a federal judge in Pennsylvania and again before the Third Circuit Court of Appeals. In June 2011, the U.S. Supreme Court vacated the Third Circuit's decision and remitted the case back to the Third Circuit for reconsideration. Sup. Ct. No 10-722. In July 2013, the Third Circuit concluded again that both the employment and housing provisions of the Hazleton ordinances were preempted by federal immigration law.

Kobach became counsel in another lawsuit, in part involving a Farmers Branch, Texas, ordinance that attempted to prevent landlords from renting to illegal immigrants. That case was appealed to the Fifth Circuit Court of Appeals where it was first heard by a three-judge panel that largely decided against the city. In addition to the costs of the immigration suits, the City had spent $850,000 defending two voting rights lawsuits. The City appealed the panel's ruling, in Case No. 10-10751, with the Fifth Circuit granting an en banc rehearing by the entire Court. After losing there with the costs to the City by that December reaching $6.1 million, the City appealed to the U.S. Supreme Court, which refused to hear its appeal in 2014. The city had engaged Kobach to help write the ordinance in October 2006. The plaintiffs in the case, including the Mexican American Legal Defense and Education Fund (MALDEF), the ACLU and the ACLU's National Immigrants' Rights Project, were awarded $1.4 million in June 2014.

As of January 2011, it was estimated that Kobach had received $6.6 million from jurisdictions as he defended their anti-immigration ordinances he had helped to create and/or defend.

As of September 2017, Kobach was listed as "Of counsel" by IRLI, the legal arm of FAIR, which is described as a "hate group" by the Southern Poverty Law Center (SPLC).

In August 2018, ProPublica and The Kansas City Star reported that none of the towns where Kobach helped to enact anti-immigration ordinances over a 13-year period still had those ordinances on the books. The ordinances were costly to defend in court, with some localities going bankrupt. At the same time, Kobach personally profited, earning more than $800,000 on legal work for the localities over a 13-year period, paid both by the localities and an anti-immigration advocacy group.

=== Arizona immigration law ===
Kobach played a significant role in the drafting of Arizona SB 1070, a state law that attracted national attention as the country's broadest and strictest—at the state level—illegal immigration measure, and has assisted in defending the state during the ongoing legal battle over SB 1070's legality. On February 7, 2008, Federal Judge Neil V. Wake ruled against a lawsuit filed by construction contractors and immigrant organizations who sought to halt a state law that imposes severe penalties on employers who knowingly hire illegal immigrants. The plaintiffs appealed the ruling, but Arizona prevailed (with Kobach's assistance) in the Ninth Circuit Court of Appeals (Chicanos por la Causa v. Arizona, 558 F.3d 856; 2009). The case was further appealed to the Supreme Court of the United States. In June 2012, the U.S. Supreme Court ruled on the case Arizona v. United States, upholding the provision requiring immigration status checks during law enforcement stops but striking down three other provisions as violations of the Supremacy Clause of the United States Constitution.

A 2015 ruling by the United States District Court for the District of Arizona limited the effectiveness of the lone provision of SB 1070 that had been upheld as constitutional. Sheriff Joe Arpaio, who had hired Kobach, lost re-election in 2016. The suit cost the county over $56,000,000 in legal fees and costs. During this litigation, it was revealed that Kobach was paid $300 per hour to train the Maricopa County Sheriff's Office in regard to immigration matters.

=== Alabama immigration law ===
Kobach was cited as a primary author of Alabama HB 56, passed in 2010, which was described as tougher than Arizona's law. Much of the law was invalidated on appeal at various levels of appeals courts or voluntarily withdrawn or reworded.

=== Border security initiatives ===
Kobach visited Coolidge, Arizona to observe North Dakota's Fisher Industries demonstration of how it would build a border fence. Fisher maintained it could erect 218 miles of the barrier for $3.3 billion and be able to complete it in 13 months. Spin cameras positioned atop the fence would use facial recognition technology. Fiber optic cables buried in the ground could detect and differentiate between human activity, vehicles, tunneling, and animals as distant as 40 feet away. The Arizona barrier would be constructed with 42 miles near Yuma and 91 miles near Tucson, Arizona, plus 69 miles near El Paso, Texas, and 15 more miles near El Centro, California. It would reportedly cost $12.5 million per mile. Louisiana Republican U.S. Senator Bill Cassidy said he traveled with the group of politicians over the Easter recess to Coolidge, which is 120 miles north of the Mexico border, because he felt that not enough barrier and border enhancements had been erected since Donald Trump became president 27 months previously. North Dakota's junior U.S. Senator, Republican Kevin Cramer, was there to promote his state's firm, Fisher Industries, which demonstrated its ability by constructing a 56-foot fence in Coolidge, located 120 miles north of the Mexican border. However, Arizona's then-U.S. Senator, Republican Martha McSally said that a barrier would not resolve the border crisis.

In late 2018, Kobach joined with other right-wing political operatives, including billionaire Erik Prince, Trump's chief political strategist and former Breitbart editor Steve Bannon, Breitbart manager Brandon Darby, former Milwaukee County, Wisconsin, Sheriff David Clarke, former Congressman Tom Tancredo and social media "fake news" scion Brian Kolfage to form an organization to raise funds ostensibly to facilitate construction of a barrier. Kolfage, a prodigious Internet fundraiser associated with a long history of dubious schemes using Facebook and GoFundMe to collect both money and potential contacts for exploitation, had raised tens of millions of donated dollars and asserted the organization would raise such private funds to construct hundreds of miles of their proposed border wall on private lands in Arizona, New Mexico, and Texas. As its prime organizer, in December 2018, Kolfage launched what he represented as an attempt to raise $1 billion via GoFundMe for the wall's construction. Kolfage stated that the target figure was achievable, adding "This won't be easy, but it's our duty as citizens".

In December 2018, he emailed the Washington Post, stating that he started the fundraiser because "political games from both parties" had held back funding for the proposed wall. Within three days, over $9 million had been raised. In January 2019, Kolfage posted a message to the GoFundMe page that he had decided raising money instead through a nonprofit would be more productive. His new 501(c)(4) nonprofit was called We Build The Wall Inc. through which he described his plans to have segments of the wall privately erected through negotiations with U.S. landowners along the border. GoFundMe however issued a statement after Kolfage's statement that it would give refunds unless the donor chose to opt into the change to where the donations would go. Kobach said that 94% of the donors agreed to have their contributions disbursed to the 501(c)4.

By January 2019, Kobach joined Kolfage's advisory board, saying he was currently unpaid, but might take a paid position with Kolfage's organization. Kobach indicated the most substantial problems along the border were "litter and security". Regarding a phone call between him and the president on January 23, 2019, Kobach reported that Trump endorsed the project saying, "...the project has my blessing, and you can tell the media that," though the White House had not independently confirmed that contention. In addition to Kolfage's history, another basic problem with the scheme was that almost all the land on the border is in the hands of the federal government, border states, and Native American tribes. The small number of privately owned border parcels in proximity to the demarcation are widely dispersed, leaving few opportunities to allow for the construction of any connected barriers. That left open the question, for what purpose would all that money actually be used? As the money Kolfage was accumulating was going to a 501(c)4, it could all be spent as "dark money" in political campaigns, with next to no public reporting of expenditures required.

However, in May–June 2019, We Build the Wall succeeded in constructing approximately a half mile of border wall in an area that the U.S. Army Corps of Engineers had previously described as too difficult to build wall. It begins at the Texas-New Mexico border and climbs 300 feet in elevation on the side of Mount Cristo Rey in Sunland Park, New Mexico. In completing the section of wall, We Build the Wall closed a major drug and alien smuggling gap on the southern border. The Border Patrol sector chief for the area called the newly constructed wall, "a game changer" in her remarks to the press.

In early June, 2019, at the eastern end of the newly constructed wall, the We Build the Wall constructed an access gate on federal land under the jurisdiction of the United States element of the International Boundary and Water Commission (IBWC). That is the body that, partnered with Mexico, administers control of rivers along the border. The commission noted the gate impermissibly blocked a U.S. Government-owned levee road. "We Build the Wall" kept the gate closed, according to the commission, despite repeated requests to allow access. On June 10, the commission took the step of securing the gate open with a lock and chain in the daytime, only keeping it locked at night.

On August 20, 2020, a federal grand jury indictment was unsealed against We Build the Wall advisory board member Steve Bannon, Kolfage, and two others, charging them with conspiracy to commit wire fraud and money laundering. Each charge has a maximum penalty of 20 years in prison upon conviction. Federal prosecutors of the U.S. Attorney's Office for the Southern District of New York allege that Bannon, United States Air Force veteran Kolfage, and the two other defendants used funds received from the We Build the Wall fundraising campaign, marketed to support the building of a border wall between the U.S. and Mexico, in a way which was "inconsistent" with how they were advertised for use to the public. According to the indictment, donations were collected through a GoFundMe campaign that was launched in December 2018. Bannon promoted the project until the day before the indictment, saying "You've been the leader of this, assisting President Trump in building this wall in these tough areas" in his War Room: Pandemic podcast. On January 20, 2021, eight hours before he left office, Trump issued a pardon for Bannon.

== Political career ==
=== Early political involvement ===
Kobach won a seat on the Overland Park City Council, in April 1999. Following the September 11 attacks, Kobach helped construct a program that mandated that men from 24 predominantly Muslim countries and North Korea be fingerprinted, photographed and questioned at government offices. Of the 83,000 plus men who did so, the government moved to deport 13,740 of them for immigration violations.

Kobach ran for Kansas State Senate in 2000, finishing third out of four Republican primary candidates.

In the 2004 election cycle, Kobach was the Republican nominee for Congress in the 3rd District, narrowly besting primary opponent and 2002 party nominee Adam Taff by 207 votes, with state representative Patricia Lightner far behind. He lost to incumbent Dennis Moore, 55%–43%. The victory was the largest of Moore's congressional campaigns. The campaign thrust Kobach onto the national stage, mostly due to his stance on illegal immigration. Kobach advocated for the imposition of a national consumption (sales) tax. He was given a speaking role on the opening day of the 2004 Republican National Convention and used his slot to call for the U.S. military to be sent to the Mexican border to block illegal immigration.

=== Chairman of the Kansas Republican Party ===
On January 28, 2007, Kobach was elected chairman of the Kansas Republican Party (GOP), serving until January 2009. Kobach's chairmanship was noted for the broad changes he introduced to election efforts. As chairman, he raised money for targeted statewide and legislative races and instituted a direct-role policy for the state party in those races. He also pushed the State Committee to create a "loyalty committee", which was charged with sanctioning Republicans who assisted Democratic candidates in contested races.

This led to several party officers being stripped of voting rights in party matters as punishment for giving campaign contributions to Democratic Candidates. After Kobach left office, a Federal Election Commission (FEC) audit strongly criticized Kobach's financial management of the Kansas GOP. The FEC audit found that when Kobach served as chairman, the state party failed to pay state and federal taxes. It was also discovered that illegal contributions were accepted.

In December 2007, Kobach sent an email saying, "[T]o date, the Kansas GOP has identified and caged more voters in the last 11 months than the previous two years."

=== Kansas Secretary of State ===
On May 26, 2009, Kobach announced his candidacy for Kansas Secretary of State. His opponents in the Republican primary were Shawnee County Election Commissioner Elizabeth Ensley and J.R. Claeys, former president of the National Association of Government Contractors. Kobach won the Republican nomination with 50.6% of the vote. Ensley and Claeys finished with 27.0% and 22.4%, respectively.

On November 2, 2010, Kobach defeated incumbent Democrat Chris Biggs, 59%–37%. Kobach was endorsed by Tennessee's former U.S. Senator Fred Thompson, as well as former U.S. Attorney General John Ashcroft (his former boss at the Dept. of Justice). Joe Arpaio, Arizona's controversial then-Sheriff of Maricopa County, Arizona, campaigned for Kobach as well.

Although Kobach's campaign treasurer, Tom Arpke, possessed campaign experience, losing a state senate race in 2008, winning a Salina City Council seat the next year, and a state House seat in 2010, he was found to have under-reported contributions by $35,000 and nearly $43,000 in expenditures in Kobach's 2010 campaign, resulting in a maximum $5,000 fine. Kobach complained that he was being discriminated against because former Republican governor Bill Graves received a much smaller fine for similar violations. Kobach alleged, "The only real distinction I can see is that I'm a conservative and he's a moderate." The chairman of the Kansas Ethics Commission said "The commission does not condone lack of candor before the commission." Commission members questioned Arpke's honesty, a recurrent theme in his subsequent career. When he obtained convictions of Kansans for interstate voting irregularities in 2016, Kobach said, "The fines are "exactly what I wanted to see in cases like this when I made the case before Kansas Legislature that this authority was needed ... A $5,000 fine is very significant, and hopefully something no one would want to have to pay", he said.

The 2012 Republican Party platform included self-deportation as a response to illegal immigration to the United States. Kobach proposed the measure, stating "If you really want to create a job tomorrow, you can remove an illegal alien today."

In 2013, the League of Women Voters joined a challenge to Kobach's "proof of citizenship" requirements for Kansas Voters.

In response to a caller on his March 1, 2015 radio show, Kobach agreed that it would not be "a huge jump" for the Obama administration to call for an end to the prosecution of all African-American suspects. The Kansas Democratic Party decried Kobach's comment as "hate speech" and termed it "a new low". Wichita's Oletha Faust-Goudeau, the only African-American woman in the Kansas Senate, called Kobach's comments ridiculous. Kobach said that he stood by his allegations declaring, "My point was to bring attention to the Obama Justice Department's position that some civil rights statutes can't be enforced against people of color", Kobach said. "For example, one of the Obama administration's first actions it took in 2009 was to drop the slam-dunk charges against the New Black Panther Party for voter intimidation." One Republican member of the Civil Rights Commission disagreed, however. Abigail Thernstrom, writing in National Review, described the incident as "small potatoes". She warned that exaggerating its importance could hurt conservatives, noting that in 45 years there had only been three successful prosecutions. She said only two "Panthers", one of whom displayed a billy club, had been at a single, majority-black precinct in Philadelphia. After months of hearings, testimony, and investigation, no actual evidence was found that any voters were afraid to vote. She continued, "Too much overheated rhetoric filled with insinuations and unsubstantiated charges has been devoted to this case."

On September 2, 2015, representatives of groups most likely to be affected by Kobach's plan to shorten a deadline for tens of thousands of suspended voters to produce proof of citizenship, including the ACLU, the League of Women Voters (LWV), the National Association for the Advancement of Colored People (NAACP) and the National Organization for Women (NOW), all testified in a Topeka hearing conducted by Brian Caskey, a Kobach appointee, against the implementation of Kobach's policy. Although Kobach's office was in the building adjacent to the courthouse, he failed to appear for the rule change hearing and to answer questions. Instead, his request was supported by Andrew Howell, a Shawnee county elections official whom Kobach also had appointed.

In response to criticism levied by the campaign staff of former secretary of state Hillary Clinton, Kobach characterized them as "left-wing knuckleheads". He remarked that Clinton was getting her "pant suit in a twist", over his stance in favor of implementing some of the most strictly enforced voter ID laws in the United States. Clinton had claimed Kobach's interventions were an attempt to make voting more difficult for key Democratic constituencies, such as young people and racial minorities.

In October 2015, Kobach spoke at a conference organized by Social Contract Press, an organization that the Southern Poverty Law Center (SPLC) has designated as a hate group.

While speaking on February 20, 2016, to a committee of the Kansas 2nd Congressional District delegates, regarding their challenges of the proof-of-citizenship voting law he championed in 2011, Kobach said: "The ACLU and their fellow communist friends, the League of Women Voters—you can quote me on that, sued".

In February 2016, Kobach endorsed Donald Trump's campaign for the U.S. Presidency, citing his stance on immigration. He proposed a halt to what he said was $23 billion in annual remittances by Mexican nationals illegally living in the U.S. unless Mexico makes a one-time $5–10 billion payment for Trump's proposed wall along the U.S.-Mexico border.

On August 1, 2018, Kobach's office was ordered by federal judge Julie A. Robinson to pay $26,000 in attorney fees to the Kansas American Civil Liberties Union for court costs in a proof-of-citizenship case which he lost.

=== Election ruling in 2014 U.S. Senate race ===
In September 2014, Democrat Chad Taylor announced he was withdrawing from that year's U.S. Senate race in Kansas. Kobach ruled that he had improperly filed his withdrawal, and his name had to remain on the ballot. Taylor claimed to have followed the instructions of Assistant Secretary of State Brad Bryant on his filing, which was completed within the appropriate time frame. Citing concurrence from Attorney General Derek Schmidt, Kobach's move was cheered by the Kansas Republican Party. Both Kobach and Schmidt were members of Republican U.S. Senator Pat Roberts' honorary campaign committee. Taylor's attempt to withdraw left the race more open for independent Greg Orman, strengthening his challenge to Sen. Roberts.

On September 18, 2014, the Kansas Supreme Court ruled that Taylor's withdrawal was proper and that Kobach had to remove Taylor's name from the ballot.

On October 1, 2014, a panel of three Shawnee County judges ruled that the Kansas Democratic Party was not required by state law to fill the vacancy on the ballot; Kobach ordered the ballots to be printed the next day. Kobach was re-elected in November 2014 over moderate former Republican state senator and Democratic candidate Jean Kurtis Schodorf by a margin of nearly 19%.

=== Kansas Secure and Fair Elections (SAFE) Act ===
In 2009, records indicated that just seven allegations of voter fraud had been referred for investigation and possible prosecution, and just a single one had been prosecuted since 2004. In 2008, a similar bill was vetoed by then-Governor Kathleen Sebelius, a Democrat.

However, on April 18, 2011, Governor Brownback signed Kobach's voter ID "SAFE" Act. Its core provisions are as follows:

1. newly registered Kansas voters must prove U.S. citizenship when registering to vote;
2. voters must show photographic identification when casting a vote in person; and
3. voters must have their signature verified and provide a full Kansas driver's license or non-driver ID number when voting by mail.

=== Travel issues ===
Under Governor Sam Brownback, who left office on January 31, 2018, Kansas endured major fiscal deficits that affected highway funding and school transportation funding. In an effort to critically examine government expenditures, the Associated Press (AP) examined records of all flights taken by top government officials (regardless of which state agency paid for the trip) taken within the 15-month period from January 2015 to March 24, 2016. The Governor of Kansas is required to reimburse the state for personal or political travel, but the AP discovered that Kobach had not reimbursed the state for flights totaling more than 4,350 miles in the state Highway Patrol (KHP) nine-passenger, Raytheon King Air 350. A number of Kobach's trips aboard the state plane seemed to provide no apparent benefits to Kansans, nor were they undertaken in pursuit of official duties. Kobach is alleged to have scheduled negligible state business to coincide with Republican Party functions, taking his family along with him.

In August, he and two of his daughters made a $360 flight to Newton to meet the county clerk before attending the county Republican Ice Cream Social. Two days later he flew to Wichita, at a cost of $524, to be the keynote speaker at the Sedgwick County Republican Party fundraising picnic. He spoke there about Republican party partisan issues.

He was unable to reserve the Beechcraft to fly to Washington, D.C., for a hearing and deposition on a lawsuit which he had joined in support of Brian Newby, whom he had helped get appointed as the federal Election Assistance Commission (EAC) director. Newby had previously been appointed by Kobach as a Kansas elections official. Kobach and a staff member's commercial flights and other expenses cost $6,594. Newby, without public notice, unilaterally changed a national voter registration form in order to require residents of Kansas, Georgia and Alabama to show proof of citizenship. Representative Jim Ward criticized Kobach's use of the state plane to promote national voter ID policies, an action he contended was intended to "suppress votes". State Senate Democratic Minority Leader Anthony Hensley said Kobach should reimburse Kansas for trips to Republican Party events, characterizing claims that the political functions coincided with official business was "probably just a ruse".

=== Voter fraud claims ===
As Secretary of State of Kansas, Kobach has implemented some of the strictest voter ID laws in the United States. In September 2016 it was reported he "agreed last month to add nearly 20,000 properly registered voters to the state's rolls only after being threatened with contempt of court." In response to a sufficient citizens petition that, as somewhat uniquely allowed in Kansas, requesting the convening of a grand jury for the purpose of investigating Kobach's actions, the state Court of Appeals ruled against him. He complained to the Kansas Supreme Court that Derek Schmidt, the Kansas Attorney General, who had withdrawn from the case, failed to properly represent him in the Appeals court. In deciding the merits, the state Supreme Court ruled on August 31, 2018 that a grand jury to investigate the matter must be convened in Douglas County, where he resided. The Brennan Center for Justice described him as "a key architect behind many of the nation's anti-voter and anti-immigration policies." Kobach has periodically made unsubstantiated claims about the extent of voter fraud in the United States.

In a 2010 press conference, Kobach asserted there could be as many as 2,000 people who were using the identities of dead people to vote in Kansas, mentioning it "certainly seems like a very real possibility" that "Albert K. Brewer" was an example of one such deceased individual who had voted in a recent primary. When The Wichita Eagle followed up on Kobach's assertion, it discovered Brewer, 78 years old, was still alive, although his father, who was born in 1904 and had a different middle initial, had died in 1996. Brewer told the Eagle reporter, "I don't think this is heaven, not when I'm raking leaves."

Kobach has also said that there are 18,000 non-citizens registered to vote in Kansas, a claim that NBC News described as "misleading" and "debunked".

Kobach supported Trump's false claims that millions of non-citizens voted in the 2016 presidential election. Kobach estimated that 3.2 million non-citizens voted, citing a widely debunked study. Kobach complained that, during one of his appearances, CNN ran text on the screen saying Kobach's claims that millions illegally voted in the 2016 election were "false". CNN also asked him if he had any proof of his allegation that thousands of Massachusetts voters actually had voted in New Hampshire in 2016. He replied that he had none.

In September 2017, Kobach claimed to have proof that voter fraud swung the 2016 Senate race in New Hampshire and may have swung New Hampshire's 2016 presidential vote; fact-checkers and election experts found that Kobach's assertion was false. Kobach claimed that more than 5,000 individuals voted by using out-of-state driving licenses as identification, even though New Hampshire residents are required to update their licenses in order to drive. However, New Hampshire state law allows residents of the state who happen to have out-of-state driving licenses to vote. There are a number of reasons why some voters may use out-of-state driving licenses, with the most likely being that they are out-of-state college students. Numerous legitimate New Hampshire voters said that this was the case with them; they were students at colleges in New Hampshire who had yet to update their driving license. New Hampshire Public Radio also found that most instances of out-of-state driving licenses being used were in college towns. Another reason is that they may be military personnel on active duty. FactCheck.Org described Kobach's claim as "baseless" and "bogus", noting that Kobach "hasn't provided evidence of any illegal voting". Later that September, Kobach backtracked on his claims, but said that there have been "anecdotal reports" about voter fraud.

Richard L. Hasen, the Chancellor's Professor of Law and Political Science at the University of California, Irvine, an election law expert, has described Kobach as a "charlatan", "provocateur" and "a leader nationally in making irresponsible claims that voter fraud is a major problem in this country."

=== Prosecutions of voter fraud ===
In 2015, Kobach received from the legislature and the governor the right to prosecute cases of voter fraud, after claiming for four years that Kansas had a massive problem of voter fraud that the local and state prosecutors were not adequately addressing. At that time, he "said he had identified more than 100 possible cases of double voting." Testifying during hearings on the bill, questioned by Rep. John Carmichael, Kobach was unable to cite a single other state that gives its secretary of state such authority. By February 7, 2017, Kobach had filed nine cases and obtained six convictions. All were regarding cases of double voting; none would have been prevented by voter ID laws. One case was dropped while two more remained pending. All six convictions involved older citizens, including four white Republican men and one woman, who were unaware that they had done anything wrong.

One of those Kansans prosecuted, Randall Kilian, thought he was expressing his preference about marijuana legalization as it affected his new Colorado retirement property after receiving a mail-in ballot in 2012, when he was 59 years old. He did not want pot growing next to his home, so he marked that issue only, and mailed it in as instructed. The sheriff and county attorney of Ellis County, Kansas, learned of this and questioned Kilian. Both concluded he had not intentionally broken the law and decided not to prosecute. However, after Kobach got prosecutorial authority in such cases, a year later, he reopened the case. Trying to avoid the expense of a trial, Kilian pleaded guilty in 2016 and paid a $2,500 fine.

In another case, also filed in 2015, Kobach prosecuted registered Republican sexagenarians Betty and Steven Gaedtke, who in 2010 had voted in both Arkansas and Olathe, Kansas. The cases were eventually heard by separate judges. Mr. Gaedtke was fined $500. The case against his wife was dropped. Though his office had original jurisdiction, Johnson County, Kansas District Attorney Steve Howe declined to comment on the Gaedtke matter though he had provided written testimony on behalf of the Kansas County & District Attorneys Association at a March 2015 legislative hearing against granting Kobach prosecutorial power. He contended that allowing Kobach's office to assume jurisdiction would be "unnecessary and wasteful given that there are already officials more appropriately positioned and resourced to deal with such matters." At that hearing, Kobach shared details regarding cases in which local prosecutors had declined to prosecute, including the Johnson County cases where the couple were alleged to have also voted in Arkansas. Wichita Democratic representative John Carmichael recalled that Howe had been asked about this case during that hearing explaining that the two were former Johnson County residents who had cast advance ballots in Kansas by mistake.

In the last of 15 such cases brought by Kobach, which was transferred in 2017 before Kobach departed office, to Howe, the D.A. dropped the charges against Sergio Salgado-Juarez, due to lack of sufficient evidence that the accused was actually the person who cast the votes. Sherman County, Kansas Trump-supporting Republican Lincoln Wilson spent $50,000 fighting his cases, pleaded guilty in 2017 to having voted in Kansas and Colorado in 2010, 2012 and 2014. He was fined $6,000 plus $158 in court costs. While traveling back and forth at the time of his father's death, Michael Hannum voted in Nebraska and Kansas. He was fined $5,500 and court costs. After James H. Criswell voted in both Kansas and Colorado during the 2016 presidential election, he was fined $1,000 plus $158 in court costs after pleading no contest. Ron Weems voted in Kansas and Colorado, but only for federal or statewide candidates in one state, which cost him $5,000.

Critics of Kobach, including the Southern Poverty Law Center, claimed he overreached on cases that district attorneys deemed not worth prosecuting, and alleged that he was motivated by racism. In his 2020 U.S. Senate campaign, Kobach hired a white supremacist who had also backed his 2018 gubernatorial campaign. In 2017, while vetting Kobach as a potential appointee for the administration of Donald Trump, the Republican National Committee raised "white supremacy" as a possible problem affecting such an action. Ron Weems, intending only to vote in local elections in Kansas and Colorado, paid a $5,000 fine. Sharon Farris pleaded guilty to having voted in Kansas and Colorado, which cost her $3,000 plus $158 in court costs. Lee Orr took an Alford Plea and paid $500 for voting early in Wyandotte County, Kansas and casting a ballot in church across the border in Missouri, as well as $200 in attorney's fees. Preston Christensen voted in both Kansas and Texas which cost him $1,000. David Haddock paid a thousand dollar fine plus $558 more in a lab fee and court costs. Que Fullmer paid the same for false swearing. College student Bailey McCaughey, voting in Kansas for the first time did not realize her mother had cast a mailed ballot for her in Colorado, an "honest mistake". She paid a $500 fine plus $158 in court costs. Kobach had warned Kansans about swarms of conspirators waiting across the U.S. southern border to vote and a non-citizen, V.D. Garcia Bebeck, voted twice in 2012 and once again in 2014. It cost him $5,000.

Kobach had examined 84 million votes that were cast in 22 states, but referred only 14 cases for prosecution. University of Kansas assistant professor of political science Patrick Miller includes voter intimidation as a form of fraud. "The substantially bigger issue with voter fraud has been election fraud being perpetrated by election officials and party officials tampering with votes ... It is not the rampant problem that the public believes that is there. Kris Kobach says it is. Donald Trump says it is. And the data just aren't there to prove it. It's a popular misconception that this is a massive problem."

A Brennan Center for Justice report calculated that rates of actual voter fraud are between 0.00004 percent and 0.0009 percent. The Center calculated that someone is more likely to be struck by lightning than to commit voter fraud.

=== Crosscheck ===
In his role as Kansas Secretary of State, Kobach directed the Interstate Voter Registration Crosscheck Program, which compared state records to find people possibly registered to vote in more than one place. The program had been launched in 2005 by a predecessor of Kobach, Republican Ron Thornburgh. From 2011 until the program's temporary suspension in early 2018, Kobach oversaw its rapid expansion to 30 states.

The program was dogged with accusations of voter suppression enabled by its primitive data matching. According to the New York Times, "The program searches for double registrations using only voters' first and last names and date of birth, and it generates thousands of false matches—John Smith in Kansas can easily be confused with John Smith in Iowa." Due to its tendency to produce false matches, the program could be implemented to suppress the vote and wrongly remove legitimate voters from voter rolls.

The large numbers of false positives produced by the program led to sensational and misleading headlines: for example, 35,750 voters in the 2012 North Carolina general election matched with voters with supposedly identical voters in other states, but upon close investigation only "eight cases of potential double voting were referred to prosecutors and two people were convicted." A 2016 paper by researchers at Stanford, Harvard, Yale and the University of Pennsylvania found that if the program were fully implemented "200 legitimate voters may be impeded from voting for every double vote stopped." By 2017, doubts over the accuracy of Crosscheck had led four states to withdraw from the program.

In 2017, researchers revealed that Crosscheck's massive database was poorly secured. Tech reporter Dell Cameron wrote in Gizmodo "It would be difficult to overstate Crosscheck's carelessness when it comes to handling voter records". Fourteen national security experts wrote an amicus brief asserting that "large-scale databases containing personal information are particularly attractive targets for malicious cyber actors" to argue against Kobach building a second, similar database. As Crosscheck member states grew concerned over the safety of their voter data, Kobach suspended the program temporarily in early 2018.

The program's suspension became federally mandated upon the settlement of Moore v Kobach (later referred to as Moore v Schwab) in December 2019 which accused the Crosscheck program of violating voters' privacy rights through their careless handling of voter data.

=== Kobach's data leaks ===
The technology website Gizmodo discovered that Kobach's office had made the last four digits of the Social Security (SS) numbers of thousands of state employees and legislators available to anyone doing an Internet search. It informed Kobach's office of the problem and was informed it would be remedied. Gizmodo analyzed conflict of interest forms filed by the current 125 state House members, and those of 40 senators, and found the partial SS numbers for 117 of the Kansas House members, and those of 34 senators, as well as the numbers of former legislators. In a separate instance, the state of Florida, which had received Social Security numbers of hundreds of Kansas voters from Kobach in 2013 via participation in the Crosscheck program, made them publicly available in 2017 leading to the federally mandated suspension of the program after a lawsuit accused Kobach of violating voters' privacy rights.

=== Proof of citizenship requirement laws ===
From 2013–2015, more than 36,000 Kansas residents (14% of those trying to register to vote) were placed on a suspense list because they failed to meet the proof of citizenship requirements that had been introduced in a 2013 law. Kobach justified the law, saying that it stopped what he described as the rampant problem of non-citizens voting; Reuters noted that "there is little evidence" of non-citizen voting being a problem. A federal judge ordered Kobach to register more than 18,000 voters kept off the rolls by the proof of citizenship law; in her ruling, she wrote, "The court cannot find that the state's interest in preventing non-citizens from voting in Kansas outweighs the risk of disenfranchising thousands of qualified voters". The judge noted that there was only evidence of three non-citizens in Kansas voting between 2003 and 2013.

A Reuters analysis of the individuals on a suspense list found that "more than 60 percent were age 25 or under. They were clustered in the high-population areas of Wichita, Topeka and the Kansas City suburbs, and the college towns of Lawrence and Manhattan." 41 percent were unaffiliated, 35 percent registered as Democrats and 23 percent as Republicans. Reuters noted that the proof of citizenship requirement "has created a chaotic two-tier system where some Kansans can vote in state elections and some cannot, some need to provide proof of citizenship and others do not, and many county election officials are uncertain how to proceed."

An appellate case, No. 16-5196, requesting an injunction by the federal courts to prevent the implementation of revised voter registrations in Kansas, Georgia and Alabama, was argued on September 8, 2016, and decided in favor of the appellants on September 26, 2016. The relief was granted by the United States Court of Appeals for the District of Columbia Circuit. It prevented the use of the revised forms. The case was the League of Women Voters of the United States, et al., versus Brian Newby, in his capacity as the Executive Director of the United States Election Assistance Commission. On June 18, 2018, a federal judge ruled that proof of citizenship voting requirements were unconstitutional, and ordered Kobach to take six hours of legal education before he could renew his law license.

=== Fish v. Kobach trial ===
On February 18, 2016, the American Civil Liberties Union filed suit against Kobach and Kansas Secretary of Revenue Nick Jordan on behalf of Steven Wayne Fish and others alleging that the Documentary Proof of Citizenship requirement of the Kansas Secure and Fair Elections (SAFE) Act violated the National Voter Registration (Motor Voter) Act of 1993. A temporary injunction was issued on May 17, which was upheld by the appellate court in Denver on October 19. On June 23, 2017, Kobach was fined $1,000 for "deliberately attempting to mislead the court" on whether he was complying with the court orders in this case.

In April 2018, Kobach was found to be in contempt of court for failing to follow an order by a federal judge to notify the approximately 18,000 voters whose voting registration was being held up by Kobach that they were fully registered and could vote. Kobach had at the time of the order assured the judge that he would notify these voters via postcard. More than 18 months later, the ACLU noted to the judge that Kobach had yet to do so. Trial hearings had run from March 6 to 19, 2018, with a contempt hearing for Kobach on March 20.

On April 18, 2018, Julie A. Robinson the chief judge of the U.S. District Court of Kansas, officially ruled that Kobach was in contempt. He was not fined but was ordered to pay court costs, including more than $26,000 in attorney fees for the American Civil Liberties Union, which sought the contempt ruling and that "any further remedial measures" would be taken upon her ruling on the case. Moriah Day, a spokeswoman for Kobach's campaign for governor, said the secretary of state's office would appeal the decision and would have no other comment. Governor Jeff Colyer, who was competing against Kobach for the Republican gubernatorial nomination, said Kobach should be required to personally pay those fees that had been awarded. The response of the Secretary's office was that Kobach is shielded from any such liability. Kobach did pay a $1,000 fine, per Judge Robinson's order, but he did so with a credit card belonging to a staff member who was detailed to Ukraine with the U.S. military. He accepted a diversion agreement the details of which remain confidential, in response to complaints made over his actions in the citizenship requirements case. In the agreement, he stipulated that he had failed to properly supervise attorneys and support staff.

=== Voter identification laws ===
Kobach traveled to Alaska both to testify in the legislature on behalf of photo I.D. laws and to recruit its participation as another state in his "Kansas Project". Opposing the change, representatives of indigenous Alaskan Natives said a photo I.D. rule would impede voting in remote, roadless, Native majority areas, referred to as "the bush". Republican Lt. Governor Treadwell declined to support the bill, however, despite Kobach's claim that it was Treadwell who recruited him to push for its passage.

Treadwell's opposition was based on concerns that the legislation in question would suppress voting in that demographic due to inherent difficulties for remote village residents in obtaining such identification, for whom getting driver's licenses can be burdensome and which are not mandated to have photos. Treadwell said he had no recollection of ever talking to Kobach directly about it although the subject had arisen in a roundtable discussion with NASS convention attendees. Responding to reporter Richard Mauer, he claimed he was unaware that Kobach had testified in his state, firmly rebutting the notion that he had any role in advancing the bill. Mauer, validated that Treadwell had not taken any position on it in testimony nor had he supported it via correspondence.

On October 31, 2018, 6 days before the gubernatorial general election, Kobach appeared on CNN with Anderson Cooper and Jeffrey Toobin. After Cooper mentioned Kobach's efforts to require proof of U.S. citizenship while voting being struck down by a federal judge and leading to Kobach being ordered to attend a legal class, Toobin accused Kobach of having racially motivated intentions with the law, stating Kobach "has devoted his career to stopping black people and poor people from voting," leading to a visibly offended Kobach calling Toobin's charge "an outrageous accusation", to which Toobin responded "Well, it's completely true." Kobach accused Toobin of displaying unsubstantiated claims, stating that "the vast majority of African-Americans approve of photo ID." Toobin called Kobach's voter suppression committee "a preposterous joke" stating that the commission was disbanded because it could not prove high rates of voter fraud in the United States. Toobin accused Kobach of supporting electoral fraud, stating that Kobach's problem was "that some people vote for Democrats, and you want to stop that by establishing voter requirements." Cooper then turned the conversation to the Deferred Action for Childhood Arrivals policy. The conflict received heavy media attention, and HuffPost stated that Kobach "has cultivated a reputation for voter suppression."

=== Discarding of provisional ballots ===
In January 2017, Kansas election officials tossed thousands of uncounted provisional ballots cast in November 2016, saying that there was no record that those residents were registered voters. Kobach's office did not compile a count of how many ballots were tossed, but an assessment by the Associated Press and the League of Women Voters of the state's 11 largest counties out of a total of 105 counties, show that at least 8,864 ballots cast were discarded without being counted, slightly more than 1 percent of total votes in those counties.

=== Commission on Election Integrity ===
Trump issued executive order 13799 establishing the Presidential Advisory Commission on Election Integrity on May 11, 2017. White House officials reported that Kobach would be serving as vice-chairman (with Vice President Pence as chairman) of the twelve-member, Republican majority commission, which will "review claims of improper registrations and voting, fraudulent registrations and voter suppression."

Although Pence was the titular head of the Commission on Voter Integrity, Kobach was its operational leader. In that capacity, Kobach, who serves on the elections committee of the National Association of Secretaries of State (NASS), wrote to the top election official in every state requesting they turn over voter data ostensibly to aid a countrywide search for evidence of election irregularities. Besides information such as the names and party affiliations of all registered voters, Kobach sought birth dates, felony conviction records, voting histories for the past decade and the last four digits of all voters' Social Security numbers. This precipitated a resounding bipartisan rejection of his inquiries with 22 states quickly rejecting his requests. Ironically, Indiana's secretary of state, Connie Lawson, and even Kobach himself, indicated that their state laws forbade them from complying.

Kentucky's secretary of state, Democrat Alison Lundergan Grimes, said the supposed basis for creation of the commission in the first place—that voter fraud was pervasive and needed to be restrained—was essentially a pretext. She continued, "Kentucky will not aid a commission that is at best a waste of taxpayer money and at worst an effort to legitimize voter suppression efforts across the country". Mississippi's Republican secretary of state, Delbert Hosemann, said, "They can go jump in the Gulf of Mexico, and Mississippi is a great state to launch from ... Mississippi residents should celebrate Independence Day and our state's right to protect the privacy of our citizens by conducting our own electoral processes."

The ACLU, representing plaintiffs in a voting rights case, asked the presiding federal judge to prevent Kobach from withholding the public documents he was photographed carrying as he met with Trump, by virtue of marking them "confidential". The plaintiffs demanded the public release of those documents they have received, that had been prepared with state funds. They claimed Kobach "made statements to the public, the Court, and the President, suggesting that noncitizen registration fraud is a serious, widespread problem", at the same time he tried to hide those same documents that debunked his claim, to prevent having to testify himself in open court about those same materials.

In June 2017, a federal magistrate judge, James O'Hara, found that Kobach had made "patently misleading representations" to the court when he claimed he did not possess the materials sought by the plaintiffs, in the course of the document dispute. Kobach had been photographed with the president with the documents under his arm, and much of the cover page was readable in that photograph. In light of Kobach's "deceptive conduct and lack of candor", he was fined $1,000 by the court and ordered to submit to questioning by the ACLU about the documents.

A student at Topeka's Washburn University took note of the magistrate judge's action and filed a complaint with the Disciplinary board of the Kansas Supreme Court, alleging that by his conduct, Kobach had "shown a lack of respect for the courts." She informed the local press that the board had notified her by mail that it was investigating her complaint.

On July 3, 2017, a complaint was filed with the United States Department of Justice by Lawyers' Committee for Civil Rights Under Law, a progressive activist group, to investigate whether Kobach violated the Hatch Act, accusing him of using his position as a federal employee, vice chairman of the Commission, to promote his current campaign for governor of Kansas, and to solicit campaign contributions.

Non-profit organizations are plaintiffs in different lawsuits including the ACLU (ACLU v. Trump and Pence and Joyner v. Presidential Advisory Commission on Election Integrity) and the NAACP (NAACP v. Trump), contesting practices engaged in by the Commission. They include the American Civil Liberties Union, the Lawyers' Committee for Civil Rights Under Law, the NAACP, Public Citizen, and the Electronic Privacy Information Center (EPIC). The lawsuits by the first two groups involve the lack of transparency of the Commission's meetings, whereas the lawsuits by the second two groups involve the collection by the Commission of personal private data.

On July 24, United States District Court for the District of Columbia Judge Colleen Kollar-Kotelly denied EPIC's request for a temporary restraining order (TRO) and preliminary injunction against the Commission, ruling that the Commission was not required to conduct a privacy review before gathering data. On August 29, the government's attorney told the judge that "confusion" at the Department of Justice had resulted in the failure to disclose relevant documents to the plaintiffs, and Kollar-Kotelly ordered the defendants to provide a "Vaughn Index" listing those documents they wanted to withhold in whole or part, and how it would comply with the Federal Advisory Committee Act.

In January 2018, in the Joyner case the Department of Justice disclosed that the White House would not be turning over any state voter data to the Department of Homeland Security, despite the White House's and Kobach's earlier statements to the contrary.

Fellow Commission member Hans Von Spakovsky of The Heritage Foundation described Kobach's efforts to expose the alleged existence of extensive voter fraud as, "carefully described research". An email sent by Von Spakovsky, the director of the Foundation's Election Law Reform Initiative, on Foundation letterhead, surfaced in September 2017, in which he had also urged United States Attorney General Jeff Sessions to block any Democrats and "moderate Republicans and/or academics", from being appointed to the Commission.

The commission was disbanded by the Trump administration on January 3, 2018, without issuing a report. Richard L. Hasen, an election law expert, described its chairman as "a leader nationally in making irresponsible claims that voter fraud is a major problem in this country."

=== 2018 Kansas gubernatorial primary ===
On June 8, 2017, Kobach formally announced his campaign for Governor of Kansas in the 2018 election. In 2017, he was appointed the vice chairman and "driving force" behind Trump's Commission on Election Integrity, which purported to quantify the extent of voter fraud in the United States, but which critics said was intended to disenfranchise or deter legal voters. The Trump administration dissolved the commission on January 3, 2018.

During this campaign for governor, Kobach repeatedly used a slogan asserting that Kansas was the "sanctuary state of the Midwest." The Associated Press noted that Kobach's slogan was "false for several reasons, including the state's laws, compliance with federal immigration authorities and the undocumented immigrant population. Kansas has not passed any laws that limit cooperation with federal immigration authorities, unlike another Midwest state, Illinois." Kobach did not identify any sanctuary cities in Kansas when asked by the Associated Press.

On August 7, 2018, Kobach defeated incumbent governor Jeff Colyer in the Republican gubernatorial primary in a tight vote. Kobach finished with a 343-vote margin.

=== 2018 Kansas gubernatorial general election ===
Democratic state senator Laura Kelly easily won the Democratic nomination. In the general election, she defeated Republican primary winner Kobach and Independent Greg Orman, who had finished second in the 2014 U.S. Senate race against incumbent Republican Pat Roberts.

Kelly had benefited from Republican defections. On September 13, 2018, three prominent Republicans endorsed Kelly: Former governor Bill Graves, former U.S. Senator Sheila Frahm, and former Kansas Senate president Dick Bond. On September 18, they were joined by former U.S. Senator and Republican from Kansas, Nancy Kassebaum, the daughter of former Governor Alf Landon, the 1936 Republican presidential nominee. She said: "I'm a Republican, but that doesn't mean you walk lock step always with the party." "...Kobach has developed a record that shows a focus on ways and how to accomplish his end goals that I think are not the best for Kansas." Regarding Kelly, Kassebaum said, "...her experience, 18 years in the Kansas Legislature..., has given her a real understanding of what it takes to work across the aisle." On October 19, Governor Mike Hayden, a Republican who served from 1987 through 1991, also joined Kelly's endorsers who included former Governors Mark Parkinson, a Republican who became a Democrat, Democrats Kathleen Sebelius and John Carlin. Every living former governor of Kansas had endorsed Kelly, except Sam Brownback. Hayden said, "This is a critical year for the state of Kansas. No one can sit on the sidelines in this election." Hayden continued, "I've been a registered Republican for over 50 years. I seldom vote for Democratic candidates, but in this race, I strongly support Laura Kelly." Hayden said that, "after much thought and analyzing", he felt that Orman could not win the governor's race. Former state senator Tim Owens, was the campaign treasurer for independent candidate Orman, but he stepped down on October 30, 2018, then endorsed Kelly. State Senate President and former chairwoman of the American Legislative Exchange Council Susan Wagle enthusiastically endorsed Kobach, though two years later she filed to run against him for the U.S. Senate seat of the retiring Pat Roberts. Wagle had said he was the "strongest candidate", and, "I ask my fellow Republicans to stand with the candidate who best reflects Kansas values."

Kobach received political contributions from US Immigration Reform PAC, a political action committee (PAC) which was headed by the widow of John Tanton, a white supremacist known for founding exclusionary and "English-Only" groups that were the core of the modern American anti-immigrant movement. It previously gave him $4,000 in his congressional race in 2004, but raised that to $20,000 when he was running for governor.

=== State Objections Board ===
In 2018, after allegations that appointed incumbent, Republican representative Michael Capps, did not live as required in the electoral district in which he was running, a complaint was submitted by the Democratic party to the board. In 2018, Capps ran for the seat in House District 85, having given his residence address as 3103 North Governeour, Wichita, with a mailing address of 6505 East Central Ave #110. Capps had first filed to run for seat 97, but after Representative Chuck Weber resigned his District 85 seat, Capps said he lived at the Governeour street address, a home which had been scheduled to be sold at auction on June 27, 2018. Democrats complained it was not Capps' true address, but the state Objections Board, composed of Republicans Lieutenant Governor Tracey Mann, Attorney General Derek Schmidt and Kobach, refused to uphold the complaint and allowed Capps to stay on the ballot. Capps received 54% of the vote to 46% for Democrat Monica Marks. When a Wichita Eagle reporter went to the home in the wake of October 2019 accusations about a fabricated attack video made by Capps against Wichita mayoral runoff candidate Brandon Whipple, an unidentified young man living there said he was "house sitting" and had not seen Capps, "in a while".

=== 2020 U.S. Senate election ===
In 2019, Kobach announced he was running for the United States Senate seat being vacated by the retiring Pat Roberts. Roberts was opposed to his candidacy, however, as was the National Republican Senatorial Committee (NRSC). Its officials privately informed Kansas Republicans that should Kobach enter the race, the NRSC would labor to assure he did not win the primary. Referring to the theme, he said, "I've been on the southern border constantly in the past six months and I can tell you stories that will make your skin crawl." A spokesperson confirmed Kobach had spoken to Trump about the announcement of his candidacy on July 4. "I don't talk about what the president and I say in our communications, but let me just say he was very encouraging when we spoke a few days ago."

Kobach was credited with introducing the controversial tactic of adding a citizenship question to the 2020 census questionnaires, but it was thought his advocacy may have led to the Supreme Court ruling against the initiative, as the Trump administration informed the court that U.S. Secretary of Commerce Wilbur Ross had initiated the divisive proposal. Joanna Rodriguez, the NRSC press secretary, stated, "Just last year Kris Kobach ran and lost to a Democrat. Now, he wants to do the same and simultaneously put President Trump's presidency and Senate Majority at risk. We know Kansans won't let that happen and we look forward to watching the Republican candidate they do choose win next fall." Kobach said he thought the NRSC had not taken such a position, responding to an inquiry, "The race in the Kansas Senate is going to be about President Trump. It's certainly not going to endanger President Trump." Kobach's 2020 campaign employed Joe Suber, an Olathe, Kansas, man who regularly makes posts to a white nationalist, Holocaust-denialist website, The Unz Review. Suber had set up and became the registered agent for a limited liability corporation, "Kobach for Senate".

==== Campaign finance violation questions ====
Kobach's involvement with the 501(c)(4) "We Build the Wall" (WBtW) has given cause for concern, as the fundraising and campaign mailing lists it is accumulating are prohibited from coordinating with his Senate campaign, but the ability and appetite for effective oversight within the Trump administration are anticipated to likely be inadequate. On August 1, 2019, Kobach sent out a campaign fundraiser using both the corporate name and email list of WBtW donors. Common Cause Vice President for policy and litigation Paul S. Ryan said, "At a minimum, this Kobach for Senate fundraising solicitation email appears to violate the 'paid for by' disclaimer requirement" for official campaign communications. Ryan specified the requirement that mandates disclosure of the financial sponsors who originate official political communications. Kobach's email might be legal if his campaign paid fair market value for the use of WBtW's list. If that were the case, a "paid for by" disclaimer would be required but was not present in the solicitation. Ryan said, "If the Kobach committee did not pay fair market value for the cost of disseminating this email, then the Kobach committee has arguably committed the more serious campaign finance law violation of receiving a corporate contribution in the form of a coordinated expenditure." We Build The Wall is legally prohibited from financing federal political campaigns, in any fashion. Besides the concerns raised about Kolfage himself, a week prior to the mailer, right-wing anti-immigrant, WBtW board member and former congressman Tom Tancredo sat on the stage alongside Kobach and endorsed him in a New Mexico rally pushing the Wall. The Kobach campaign said after Common Cause filed a formal complaint and request for an investigation into the apparent violations, that it is a "radical leftist organization" that the complaint was without substance and, "This attack by Common Cause also includes a frivolous letter to the Department of Justice, asking the Department of Justice to launch a pointless investigation. This is also typical of Common Cause tactics and it is intended to cause distraction wherever conservative Republicans are leading in important political campaigns."

On July 23, 2019, Kansas Senate President Susan Wagle of Wichita filed the paperwork with the Federal Election Commission necessary to run. She criticized Kobach's employment in his controversial privately financed and constructed scheme to build the southern border wall. Wagle supports the building of a federally designed, bid, and funded wall while saying Kobach's group undermines federal involvement. "We don't need some rogue organization going out and building the wall," she said. In July 2018, Wagle had supported Kobach in the gubernatorial primary, saying, "I am proud to endorse Kris Kobach." The endorsement was unlawfully sent out by Wagle's staff spokeswoman on a state computer, thus violating Kansas ethics rules.

==== Primary debate ====
In a live-streamed debate on May 22, 2020, in a ballroom devoid of spectators due to the COVID-19 pandemic, all candidates praised president Donald Trump. Kobach took on his opponents who all agreed that he could not win the general election against presumptive Democratic nominee, Barbara Bollier. They were Wagle, former Kansas City Chiefs defensive end Dave Lindstrom, wealthy businessman Bob Hamilton, and incumbent congressman Roger Marshall. Marshall said, "We cannot afford to send a failed candidate back this fall who will lose to Barbara Bollier and hand the Senate majority over to Chuck Schumer." "Instead, we need to send a tried and trusted friend of President Trump." Referring to Marshall, Kobach replied, "Do you want a go-along-to-get-along kind of senator, a gutless wonder who never takes a stand, or, do you want someone who poses a threat?" Hamilton said voters didn't have to choose between Kobach, who couldn't win, and a moderate Marshall, in whose behest the state party leaders had urged Senator Wagle and Lindstrom, to drop out of the race. Objecting to the party pressure, Lindstrom characterized his opponents as "shortsighted, self-serving...career politicians who are divisive, controversial," and, "have a record of losing elections." Wagle touted her own candidacy, saying, "It's very, very important that we send a leader to the U.S. Senate who is articulate, who is persuasive, who other people respect." "I'm the one who's already debated Barbara Bollier." "I win on the Senate floor. I've beat (sic) her numerous times," "...the conservative voice that can beat that liberal voice in the U.S. Senate." In response to a claim that Marshall would not prioritize agriculture, Marshall said, "Fake news and another lie by Kris Kobach."

=== Connections with Trump administration ===
Kobach was a member of the Platform Committee of the 2016 Republican National Convention. It was subsequently reported that Kobach was being considered for Secretary of Homeland Security. He was photographed carrying a document into a meeting with Trump the title of which could be read as being, "Department of Homeland Security, Kobach Strategic Plan for First 365 Days". This plan reportedly included a register of Muslims as part of a suite of proposals, which included the "extreme vetting" of immigrants. The New York Times described Kobach as "close to the White House inner circle, including the president and his chief strategist, Steve Bannon", and having told the Associated Press that he met Trump in May 2017 through his son Donald Trump Jr., "with whom he has a mutual friend". He was named vice chairman of the new Presidential Advisory Commission on Election Integrity by Trump in 2017. In June 2017 he told supporters that he has had "the honor of personally advising President Trump, both before the election and after the election, on how to reduce illegal immigration."

In a March 14, 2019 hearing, Commerce Department Secretary Wilbur Ross was questioned about his conversations regarding the adding of a citizenship question to the 2020 census surveys, which he had with immigration hardliners Kobach, Bannon, and Attorney General Jeff Sessions. Missouri Democratic representative Lacy Clay accused Ross of being "complicit" regarding his efforts to weaken minority group voting rights, accusing Ross of committing perjury. He called for Ross to tender his resignation, saying, "You lied to Congress. You misled the American people and you are complicit in the Trump administration's intent to suppress the growing political power of the non-white population." The United States Supreme Court heard arguments on April 23, 2019, regarding appeals of rejections by three circuit courts of the proposed inclusion of the survey question. The court affirmed the appeals, rejecting the question's inclusion, and it was felt Kobach's initial advocacy of the initiative undermined the rationale of the Census Bureau's case.

When asked by ABC News about Trump's false claim that he (Trump) had "won the popular vote if you deduct the millions of people who voted illegally," Trump advisor Kellyanne Conway gave Kobach as a source of the claim. Kobach later told reporters in Kansas that, "I think the president-elect is absolutely correct when he says the number of illegal votes cast exceeds the popular-vote margin between him and Hillary Clinton," pointing to a 2014 study led by Jesse Richman, that claimed that "6.4 percent of noncitizens voted in 2008". However, Richman's results, when reviewed by other researchers, were thoroughly rejected. Richman claimed to have found 489 noncitizens within a Harvard survey of 55,400 American adults, called the Cooperative Congressional Election Study. Two years later, three coordinators of the original C.C.E.S. study went back and re-interviewed 19,000 of the respondents, finding only 85 who said they were noncitizens and not one could be matched to a valid voting record. "Thus the best estimate of the percentage of noncitizens who vote is zero", the researchers wrote.

In late March 2019, the Associated Press reported that President Donald Trump was considering creating a post of "immigration czar" to coordinate efforts among federal agencies involved in the issues, with Kobach being one of two top candidates for the job.

In the spring of 2019, Kobach presented a 10-point list of conditions that would have to be fulfilled for him to become Trump's "immigration czar". The list included: A West Wing office; "walk in" access to the Oval Office; 24-hour access to a government jet so he could fly to the border on a moment's notice and travel back to Kansas on weekends; an assurance that he would be made Secretary of Homeland Security by November 2019; a guarantee that he would be the administration's primary spokesman on immigration policy; a guarantee that other Cabinet secretaries whose positions relate to immigration would defer to him, with Trump mediating disputes as needed; a seven-person staff; a security detail if necessary; and the title of assistant to the president. Some Trump administration officials were shocked by Kobach's presumptuousness. The position would not require Senate confirmation; Trump, however, was certain Kobach would have difficulty winning Senate confirmation for the position.

After Joe Biden won the 2020 presidential election and Donald Trump refused to concede, Kobach led a group which sought to aid Trump in his efforts to overturn the election results.

=== Kansas Attorney General ===
==== Election ====
In 2022, Kobach filed to run for the post of Kansas Attorney General ("AG"), as a Republican. In the 2022 Kansas Attorney General election, Kobach defeated two other GOP candidates—state legislator Kellie Warren and former federal prosecutor Tony Mattivi—to become the party nominee for AG.

In a campaign somewhat toned down from his previous showy, controversial campaigns, Kobach nevertheless, again, talked (less) about illegal immigration, and repeated his desire to tighten voting procedures, making undocumented claims of voter fraud (repudiated by fellow Republican, Kansas Secretary of State Scott Schwab, the state's top election official). He also vowed to establish a team in the Kansas Attorney General's office dedicated to suing President Biden and his administration.

In the general election, Kobach faced novice Democratic politician Chris Mann, a former police officer, prosecutor, and state securities regulator, who is an attorney in private practice. While attacking Kobach's professional competency, Mann promised to run the AG's office in a non-political manner, and focus on public safety concerns and consumer protection.

Mann initially raised more campaign funds than Kobach, drawing in $952,000 in campaign contributions since late July, while Kobach, in the same period, reported $465,000 raised. However, in his overwhelmingly Republican-dominated state, Kobach was narrowly elected to the post November 8, 2022, with 51% of the vote (to Mann's 49%).

==== Tenure ====
In 2024, Kobach sued the Biden administration for its push to replace the 9 million remaining lead pipes in the United States. Kobach asserted that the benefits of replacing lead pipes "may be entirely speculative". However, lead is toxic and the harms of lead exposure, including permanent brain damage to children, are well-established. Secretary of Transportation Pete Buttigieg criticized Kobach's statement, writing, "The benefit of *not being lead poisoned* is not speculative. It is enormous. And because lead poisoning leads to irreversible cognitive harm, massive economic loss, and even higher crime rates, this work represents one of the best returns on public investment ever observed."

On June 10, 2024, Kobach led a coalition of 17 states in filing a lawsuit against the Biden administration in the Southern District Court of Georgia. The complaint alleged that the administration's 2024 farmworker protection rule unconstitutionally granted farmworkers on H-2A visas the rights to collective bargaining and unionizing. It argued that the National Labor Relations Act of 1935 intentionally excluded these workers from such protections. Additionally, they argued that the Department of Labor did not have the authority to "grant H-2A workers better working conditions than their American counterparts are statutorily allowed to have." On August 26, 2024, U.S. District Judge Lisa Godbey Wood issued an injunction stopping the rule from being enforced in the 17 plaintiff states.

== Political positions ==
Kobach advocated for the Convention of States, and has frequently voiced his support for states' rights. Kobach supports strict abortion regulations and identifies as pro-life. He has also stated that he "supports mandatory prison sentences for selling illegal drugs."

=== Anti-immigration views ===
Kobach initially came to prominence in U.S. politics over his hardline views on immigration, and his involvement in the implementation of high-profile anti-immigration ordinances in various American towns.

In October 2017, Kobach wrote a column in Breitbart News which said that immigrants commit a disproportionate share of crimes, and that the United States should limit the number of immigrants admitted on a yearly basis. According to The Kansas City Star, the claims made in the article have "been debunked by numerous studies over multiple years. In fact, studies have found immigrants are less likely to commit crimes than people born in the U.S." To support his claims, Kobach cited a column by Peter Gemma, who is associated with white supremacist groups and the American Holocaust denial movement.

=== Barack Obama's citizenship ===
Kobach repeatedly called on President Barack Obama to release his birth certificate and defended those who persisted in claiming that Obama may have been born outside the United States, specifically in Kenya. As Kansas Secretary of State, he requested additional evidence of Obama's birth before he would allow Obama to appear on Kansas ballots for the 2012 presidential election, even after the release of Obama's long-form birth certificate. In 2009, Kobach "joked at a GOP barbecue that Obama and God had something in common because neither has a birth certificate." Kobach responded to criticism of the joke with "Lighten up. It's just a joke... Are they really suggesting it is forbidden to tell jokes about Barack Obama?"

In 2010, during his candidacy for the Kansas secretary of state, Kobach said Obama could end the controversy over his citizenship by producing a "long-form" birth certificate. In the preceding two years, judges had termed such suits "frivolous". These included U.S. District Judge R. Barclay Surrick of Philadelphia, who had thrown out a lawsuit on the issue, saying it was a waste of the court's time. Kobach said that the certificate released by Obama "doesn't have a doctor's signature on it. ... Look, until a court says otherwise, I'm willing to accept that he's a natural U.S. citizen. But I think it is a fair question: Why just not produce the long-form birth certificate?"

In September 2012, while leading the three-person State Objections Board, and joined by Kansas Attorney General Derek Schmidt and Kansas Lieutenant Governor Jeff Colyer, Kobach requested additional evidence, including the product of investigations from Mississippi and Arizona, that Obama was born in the United States. Kobach said he did not have enough evidence to determine if Obama could appear on the Kansas ballot for the 2012 presidential election. The New York Times editorialized that the actions of the Kansas authorities "reignited long-running conspiracy theories that the president was not born in the United States." CNN reported that "the Kansas ballot measure is one of several examples of the birther movement's still-persistent presence." At the time, Obama had released his long-form birth certificate but CBS News noted that "so-called 'birthers' persist with a variety of arguments that he is ineligible for the presidency. Generally, they claim that the birth certificate as released by the president is a forgery or that he is not eligible for the presidency despite being born in Hawaii." Kobach maintained that the questioning of Obama's citizenship was not frivolous. Later that September, after a complainant dropped his challenge of Obama's eligibility for the Kansas ballot and after Hawaii officials sent a note to Kobach saying that Obama's birth certificate was genuine, Kobach allowed Obama to remain on the ballot and said, "That, for me, settles the issue".

In 2016, Kobach said that there are "interesting things" about the question of Obama's citizenship that "just made you scratch your head." Kobach said that Obama's opposition to the Kansas proof of citizenship requirement law was possibly because the president was not a citizen himself: "maybe that's why he doesn't talk about proof of citizenship, because he, you know, he would rather not bring up the citizenship issue."

=== Guns ===
Kobach is against most gun control and identifies himself as a supporter of the rights of gun owners. He supported extending concealed carry rights down from age 21 to age 18 and the idea that school teachers, coaches, and staff should be allowed to carry guns.

== Personal life and activities ==
Kobach was born in Madison, Wisconsin, to Janice Mardell (née Iverson) and William Louis Kobach. His great-grandparents were Polish on his father's side and Norwegian on his mother's side; they came to Wisconsin in the 1890s, where they were mostly farmers.

At the age of seven, in 1974, Kobach moved to Kansas with his parents and two sisters, and grew up mostly in Topeka where his father owned the Bill Kobach Buick-GMC car dealership.

On June 23, 2001, Kobach married Heather Mannschreck, a former environmental systems engineer who now has a part-time photography business in addition to homeschooling their five daughters. Kobach, his wife, and their children live on their farm near Lecompton, north of Lawrence, Kansas. Their residence is in a building, the permits for which Kobach originally received lower taxation and permitting fees due to agricultural exemptions, rather than residential use. Kobach said he intends to build a residential home on the property. When building it, Kobach "closed in" the plumbing and electric work so it was not possible for the building inspector to examine it without tearing up the floor and removing walls that covered wiring. There was no septic system or water source. Despite those difficulties, he was granted permit waivers by the county administration, precipitating public controversy.

Kobach did missionary work in Uganda in 2005 and 2006. Previously, he had volunteered to help build a school in a South African township through the Get Ahead Foundation. He served as a Big Brother. He was a national rowing champion (men's pair event, master's division in 1998; men's double event, master's division, 2001, 2002). He is an Eagle Scout.

On February 7, 2018, the Better Business Bureau (BBB) issued an "F" rating, its lowest possible rating, for a Missouri-based group called Veterans in Defense of Liberty (VIDOL). The BBB found that the 501(c)(4) organization received less than 6% of $1.4 million in donations solicited for the organization. Over 94% of funds went to American Target Advertising (ATA), a Virginia-based company which mailed solicitations for donations. Kobach, who has no military background, said he joined the group's advisory board because he cares "deeply about veterans and veterans' issues" and would review the organization's financial records to determine whether to sever ties with the group. In July 2019, VIDOL said it had revised its previous IRS 990 form to reflect a much lower percentage of its revenues going to Richard Viguerie's conservative fundraising apparatus, ATA. Seventeen months later, on July 12, 2019, it was reported that despite the VIDOL organization's difficulties, Kobach still remained on its board of directors. The St. Louis Better Business Bureau indicated it did not have sufficient evidence to revive its original "F" rating. Chris Thetford, spokesman for the Bureau, said Magill's group does not currently have a revised rating because its IRS form 990 for 2017 was not yet publicly available, so the bureau backed its initial consumer warning, one remaining online with a clarification from the advertising firm about the prodigious costs of outsourcing direct mailings. He said if consumers desire to write a check to the organization they should be told that their contributions are not being solicited for a charitable cause. Thetford further said, "The real issue here...It was not conspicuously disclosed to people on their marketing materials that donations were not tax deductible."

In October 2020, amid the COVID-19 pandemic, Kobach and businessman Daniel Drake pitched a line of products to Kansas legislators, claiming that their Sarus Systems products would "kill COVID" and bring hundreds of jobs to the state. An independent review by the Kansas Reflector and the Journalism school at Columbia University found no evidence to support either claim.

== Electoral history ==
Republican primary results, 2004 Kansas's 3rd Congressional district election
Party	Candidate	Votes	%
Republican	Kris Kobach	39,129	44.0
Republican	Adam Taff	38,922	43.7
Republican	Patricia Lightner	10,836	12.1

Kansas's 3rd Congressional district election, 2004
Party	Candidate	Votes	%
Democratic	Dennis Moore (incumbent)	184,050	54.8
Republican	Kris Kobach	145,542	43.3
Libertarian	Joe Bellis	3,191	0.9
Reform	Richard Wells	2,956	0.8

Republican primary results, 2010 Kansas Secretary of State election
Party	Candidate	Votes	%
Republican	Kris Kobach	156,462	50.6
Republican	Elizabeth "Libby" Ensley	90,680	26.9
Republican	J. R. Claeys	69,039	22.3

Kansas Secretary of State election, 2010
Party	Candidate	Votes	%
Republican	Kris Kobach	489,640	59.0
Democratic	Chris Biggs (incumbent)	308,641	37.2
Libertarian	Phillip Horatio Lucas	17,336	2.0
Reform	Derek Langseth	13,896	1.6

Republican primary results, 2014 Kansas Secretary of State election
Party	Candidate	Votes	%
Republican	Kris Kobach (incumbent)	166,793	64.7
Republican	Scott Morgan	90,680	35.2

Kansas Secretary of State election, 2014
Party	Candidate	Votes	%
Republican	Kris Kobach (incumbent)	508,926	59.2
Democratic	Jean Kurtis Schodorf	350,692	40.7

Republican primary results, 2018 Kansas gubernatorial election
Party	Candidate	Votes	%
Republican	Kris Kobach	128,549	40.62
Republican	Jeff Colyer (incumbent)	128,204	40.51
Republican	Jim Barnett	27,910	8.82
Republican	Ken Selzer	24,763	7.83
Republican	Patrick Kucera	3,204	1.01
Republican	Tyler Ruzich	2,270	0.72
Republican	Joseph Tutera Jr.	1,555	0.49
Total votes		316,455	100.0

Kansas gubernatorial election results, 2018
Party	Candidate	Votes	%
Democratic	Laura Kelly	506,727	48.0
Republican	Kris Kobach	453,645	43.0
Independent	Greg Orman	68,590	6.5
Libertarian	Jeff Caldwell	20,020	1.9
Independent	Rick Kloos	6,584	0.6
Total votes		1,055,566	100.0

Kansas United States Senate Primary Election Results 2020
Party	Candidate	Votes	%
Republican	Roger Marshall	158,788	40.3%
Republican	Kris Kobach	103,476	26.2%
Republican	Bob Hamilton	74,283	18.8%
Republican	Dave Lindstrom	25,562	6.5%
Republican	Steve Roberts	7,605	1.9%
Republican	Brian Matlock	6,443	1.6%
Republican	Lance Berland	6,061	1.5%
Republican	John Miller	4,120	1%
Republican	Derek Ellis	3,741	0.9%
Republican	Gabriel Robles	3,494	0.9%
Republican	John Berman	797	0.2%
Total votes			100.0%

Republican primary results, 2022 Kansas Attorney General election
Party	Candidate	Votes	%
Republican	Kris Kobach	200,904	42.3
Republican	Kellie Warren	180,367	37.9
Republican	Tony Mattivi	94,155	19.8
Total votes		475,426	100.0

Kansas Attorney General election, 2022
Party	Candidate	Votes	%
Republican	Kris Kobach	506,817	50.80
Democratic	Chris Mann	490,925	49.20
Total votes		997,742	100.00

== See also ==
- List of American conservatives

Party political offices
Preceded by Tim Shallenburger	Chair of the Kansas Republican Party; 2007–2009	Succeeded by Amanda Adkins
Preceded by Ron Thornburgh	Republican nominee for Secretary of State of Kansas; 2010, 2014	Succeeded by Scott Schwab
Preceded by Sam Brownback	Republican nominee for Governor of Kansas; 2018	Succeeded by Derek Schmidt
Preceded by Derek Schmidt	Republican nominee for Attorney General of Kansas; 2022, 2026	Most recent
Political offices
Preceded by Chris Biggs	Secretary of State of Kansas; 2011–2019	Succeeded by Scott Schwab
Legal offices
Preceded by Derek Schmidt	Attorney General of Kansas; 2023–present	Incumbent
