= 2026 Kansas Attorney General election =

- November 3, 2026

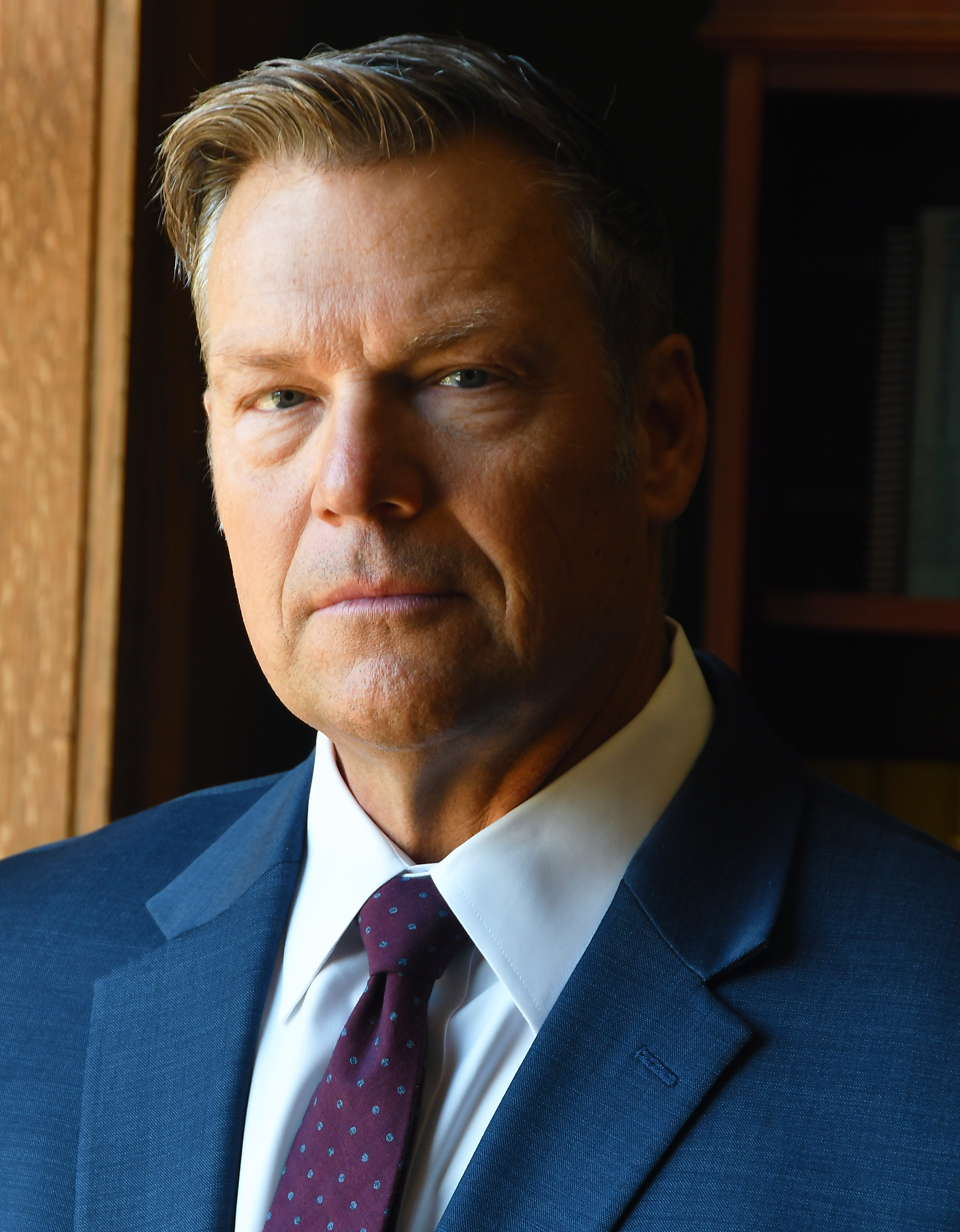
Nominee	Chris Mann	Kris Kobach
Party	Democratic	Republican
Popular vote	552,753	539,297
Percentage	50.62%	49.38%
- Mann: 50–60% 60–70% 70–80% Kobach: 50–60% 60–70% 70–80% 80–90%
Attorney general before election
Kris Kobach
Republican
Elected Attorney general
Chris Mann
Democratic

The 2026 Kansas Attorney General election was held on November 3, 2026, to elect the attorney general of Kansas. Democratic lawyer and former nominee Chris Mann defeated Republican one-term incumbent Kris Kobach. The election was a rematch of the 2022 election.

Kobach and Mann won their respective primaries unopposed on August 4.

== Republican primary ==
=== Candidates ===
==== Nominee ====
- Kris Kobach, incumbent attorney general (2023–present)

=== Endorsements ===
Kris Kobach

Local officials

- 51 county sherriffs

=== Results ===
Republican primary results
Party	Candidate	Votes	%
Republican	Kris Kobach (incumbent)	280,973	100.0
Total votes		280,973	100.0

== Democratic primary ==
=== Candidates ===
==== Nominee ====
- Chris Mann, lawyer and 2022 attorney general nominee

=== Endorsements ===
Chris Mann

Labor unions

- Kansas AFL-CIO
- United Auto Workers

Organizations

- Council on American–Islamic Relations
- Democratic Attorneys General Association
- End Citizens United
- Planned Parenthood Great Plains
- Reproductive Freedom for All

=== Results ===
Democratic primary results
Party	Candidate	Votes	%
Democratic	Chris Mann	202,358	100.0
Total votes		202,358	100.0

== General election ==
=== Predictions ===
Source	Ranking	As of
Sabato's Crystal Ball	Lean R	October 29, 2026

=== Polling ===
Poll source	Date(s) administered	Sample size (Note: Key: A – all adults RV – registered voters LV – likely voters V – unclear)	Margin of error	Kris Kobach (R)	Chris Mann (D)	Undecided
Global Strategy Group (D) (Note: Poll sponsored by the Democratic Attorneys General Association)	September 27 – October 1, 2026	700 (LV)	± 3.5%	45%	49%	6%
Global Strategy Group (D)	September 13–16, 2026	800 (LV)	± 3.5%	46%	47%	7%
Pulse Decision Science (R)	January 12–14, 2026	503 (LV)	± 4.4%	47%	37%	16%
Global Strategy Group (D)	November 12–16, 2025	600 (LV)	± 4.0%	46%	44%	10%

== Results ==
2026 Kansas Attorney General election Unofficial results – 99% reporting
Party	Candidate	Votes	%	±%
Democratic	Chris Mann	552,753	50.62	+1.42
Republican	Kris Kobach (incumbent)	539,297	49.38	−1.42
Total votes		1,092,050	100.00	
Democratic gain from Republican				

== See also ==
- 2026 United States elections
- 2026 Kansas elections

== Notes ==
Partisan clients
