= Patrick Penn =

American politician

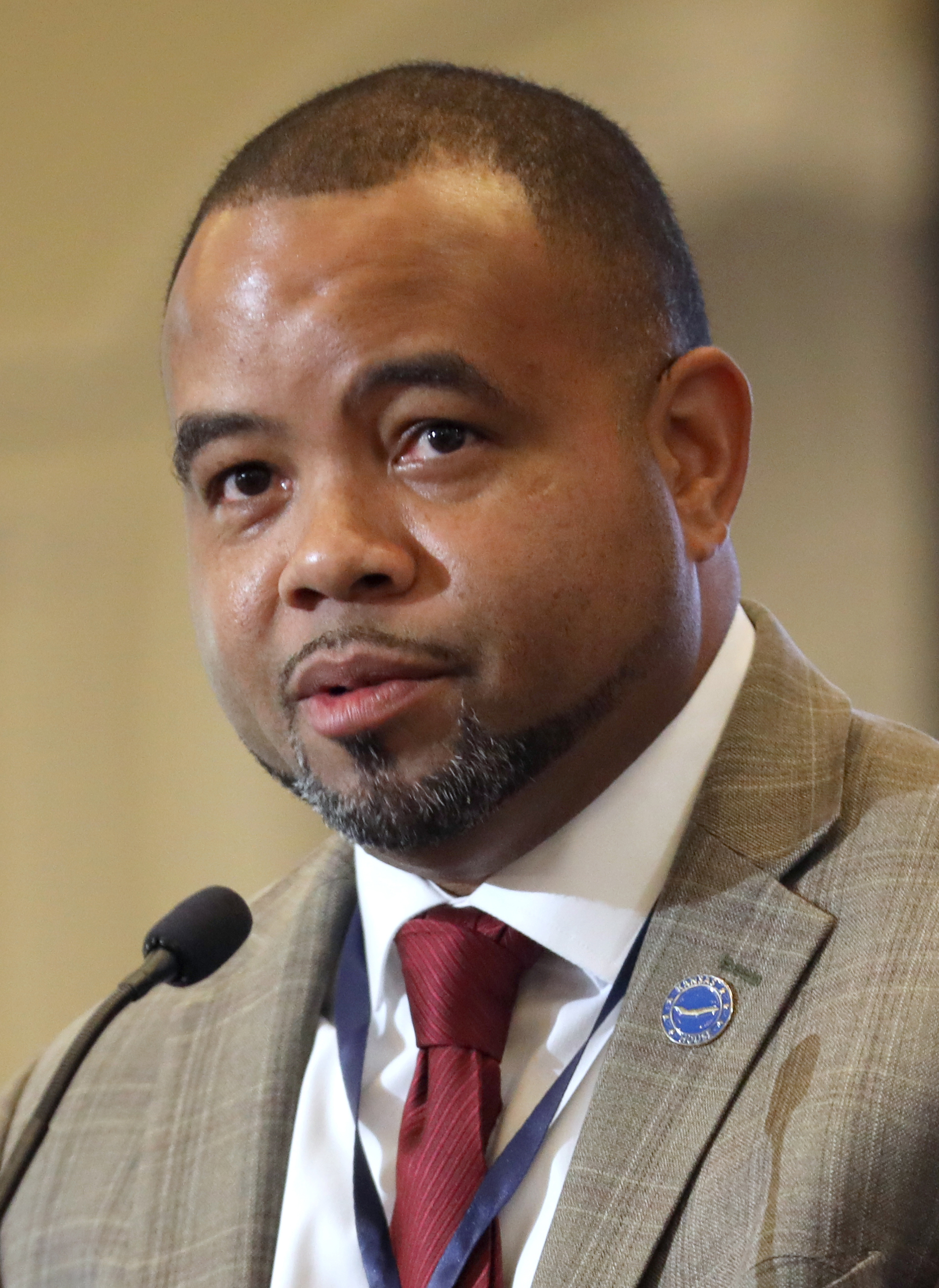

Deputy Under Secretary of Agriculture for Food, Nutrition, and Consumer Services
- Incumbent
- Assumed office June 13, 2025

Member of the Kansas House from the 85th district
- In office January 11, 2021 – June 13, 2025
- Preceded by: Michael Capps
- Succeeded by: Steven Brunk

Personal details
- Party: Republican
- Spouse: Talia Penn
- Children: 4
- Education: Colorado State University (BS); George Mason University (MS)

Military service
- Branch/service: United States Army
- Rank: Captain
- Battles/wars: Iraq War; War in Afghanistan

Patrick Penn is an American politician who served as a member of the Kansas House of Representatives from the 85th district from 2021 through 2025. Currently, Penn is the Deputy Under Secretary of Agriculture for Food, Nutrition, and Consumer Services.

== Early life and education ==
Penn was raised in the foster care system. After graduating from high school, he joined the United States Army. During his tenure, Penn earned a Bachelor of Science in sociology/criminology from Colorado State University and a Master of Science in applied Information technology from the Volgenau School of Engineering of George Mason University.

While in the United States Army, Penn was a captain and was deployed to Iraq and Afghanistan.

== Career ==
Once Penn had retired from the U.S. Army, he worked for Textron Aviation.

=== Kansas House of Representatives ===
In 2020, Penn sought election to the Kansas House of Representatives. In August, he defeated incumbent Michael Capps, and was elected in the general election in November. He assumed office on January 11, 2021. New Politics describes him as a Christian conservative.

=== Trump Administration ===
Penn resigned from the Kansas House of Representatives in June 2025 to be Deputy Under Secretary of Agriculture for Food, Nutrition, and Consumer Services under president Donald Trump. United States Secretary of Agriculture Brooke Rollins stated that Penn's "personally invested in ensuring farmers and rural America prosper."
