= 2022 Kansas Attorney General election =

- November 8, 2022
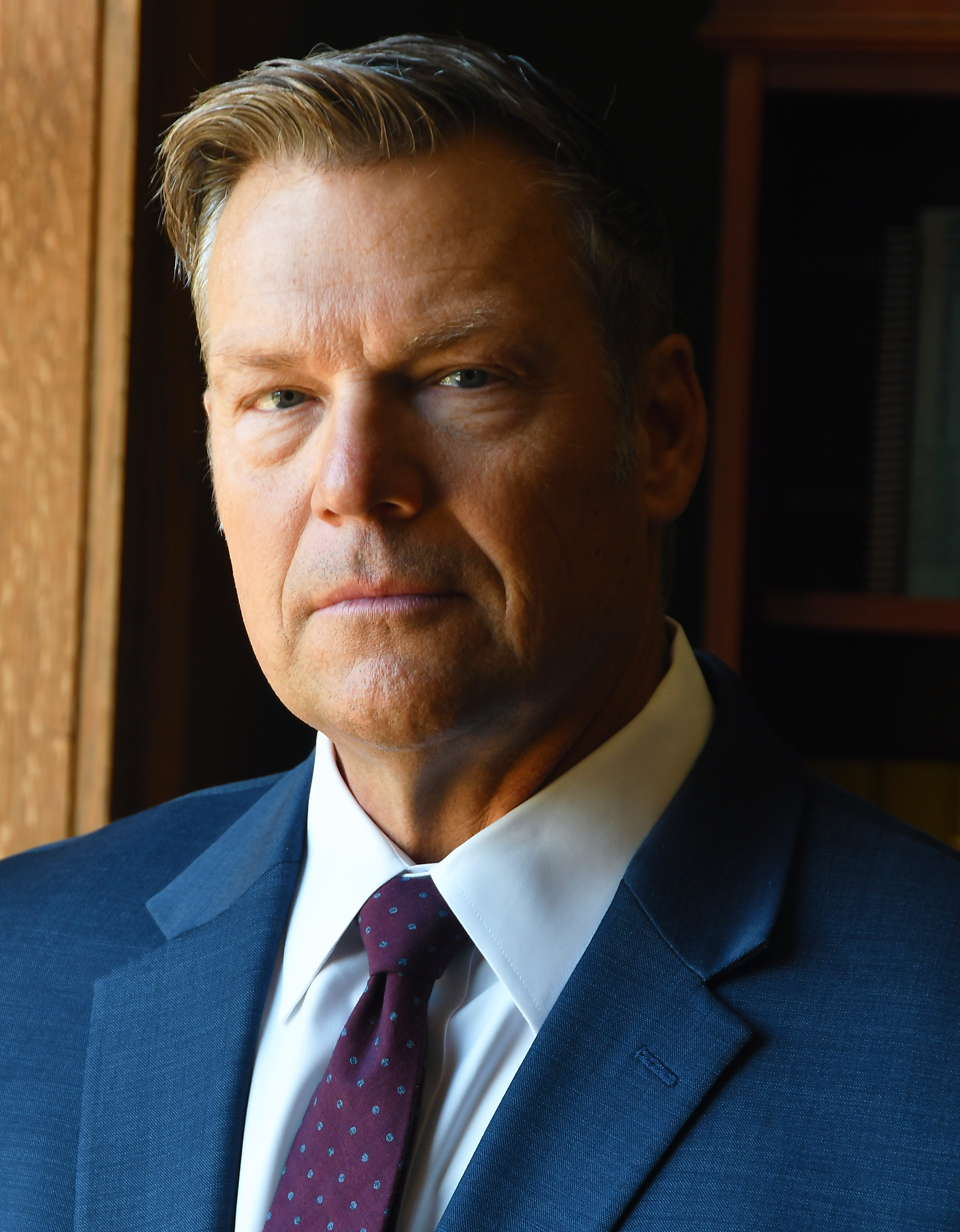

Nominee	Kris Kobach	Chris Mann
Party	Republican	Democratic
Popular vote	506,817	490,925
Percentage	50.80%	49.20%
- Kobach: 50–60% 60–70% 70–80% 80–90% >90% Mann: 50–60% 60–70% 70–80% 80–90% >90% Tie: 50% No votes
Attorney General before election
Derek Schmidt
Republican
Elected Attorney General
Kris Kobach
Republican

The 2022 Kansas Attorney General election took place on November 8, 2022, to elect the Attorney General of Kansas. Incumbent Republican Attorney General Derek Schmidt announced he would retire to run for governor. The Republican nominee was former Kansas Secretary of State Kris Kobach, and the Democratic nominee was former police officer, prosecutor, and state securities regulator Chris Mann. Kobach narrowly won, taking 50.80% of the general election vote to Mann's 49.20%. Kobach later lost re-election in 2026 in a rematch with Mann.

== Republican primary ==
=== Candidates ===
==== Nominee ====
- Kris Kobach, former Secretary of State of Kansas, former Chair of the Kansas Republican Party, and board member of We Build the Wall; candidate for governor in 2018 and U.S. senator in 2020

==== Eliminated in primary ====
- Tony Mattivi, retired federal prosecutor
- Kellie Warren, state senator for the 11th district

==== Declined ====
- Blaine Finch, speaker pro tempore of the Kansas House of Representatives
- Mike Kagay, district attorney for Kansas's 1st district court
- Derek Schmidt, incumbent attorney general (ran for governor)
- Todd Thompson, district attorney for Kansas's 3rd district court

=== Endorsements ===
Kris Kobach

U.S. Executive Branch officials

- John Ashcroft, former U.S. Attorney General (2001–2005)
- Steve Bannon, former Senior Counselor to the President (2017)

U.S. Senators

- Ted Cruz, U.S. Senator from Texas (2013–present)

County sheriffs

- Bill Carr, Ford County sheriff
- Kris Casper, Wichita County sheriff
- Andy Dedeke, Leavenworth County sheriff
- Kevin Friend, Linn County sheriff
- Brian Hill, Shawnee County sheriff
- Scott King, Pawnee County sheriff
- John Merchant, Brown County sheriff
- Brandon Mitchell, Ness County sheriff
- Tim Morse, Jackson County sheriff
- Vernon Valentine, Anderson County sheriff
- Chris Well, Osage County sheriff

Organizations

- Republicans for National Renewal
Kellie Warren

U.S. Executive Branch officials

- Mike Pompeo, former U.S. Secretary of State (2018–2021) and former Director of the CIA (2017–2018)

U.S. Senators

- Roger Marshall, U.S. Senator from Kansas (2021–2027)

Organizations

- Americans for Prosperity
- Kansas Chamber of Commerce

=== Debates & forum ===
2022 Kansas Attorney General Republican primary debates & candidate forum
No.	Date	Host	Moderator	Link	Republican	Republican	Republican
Key: P Participant A Absent N Not invited I Invited W Withdrawn							
Key: P Participant A Absent N Not invited I Invited W Withdrawn					Kris Kobach	Tony Mattivi	Kellie Warren
1	May 19, 2022			YouTube	P	P	P
2	Jun. 15, 2022	Johnson County; Bar Association; KCPT	Nick Haines	YouTube	P	P	P
2	Jun. 26, 2022	Saline County; Granny Brigade		YouTube	P	P	P

=== Polling ===
Poll source	Date(s) administered	Sample size (Note: Key: A – all adults RV – registered voters LV – likely voters V – unclear)	Margin of error	Kris Kobach	Tony Mattivi	Kellie Warren	Undecided
Cygnal (R) (Note: Poll was sponsored by Mattivi's campaign)	June 30 – July 1, 2022	500 (LV)	± 4.4%	31%	9%	16%	44%
Battleground Connect (R) (Note: Poll was sponsored by a pro-Kellie Warren PAC)	May 22–25, 2022	539 (LV)	± 4.2%	38%	4%	19%	39%
WPA Intelligence (R) (Note: Poll was sponsored by Kobach's campaign)	April 18–20, 2022	518 (LV)	± 4.3%	52%	7%	12%	28%
Remington Research Group (R) (Note: Poll was sponsored by Keep Kansas Conservative PAC, which supports Kobach)	September 1–2, 2021	800 (LV)	± 3.3%	43%	7%	15%	35%

=== Results ===
Results by county: Kobach: 30–40%; 40–50%; 50–60%; 60–70%; Warren: 40–50%; 50–60%

Republican primary results
Party	Candidate	Votes	%
Republican	Kris Kobach	200,904	42.26
Republican	Kellie Warren	180,367	37.94
Republican	Tony Mattivi	94,155	19.80
Total votes		475,426	100.0

== Democratic primary ==
=== Candidates ===
==== Declared ====
- Chris Mann, attorney, former police officer, and former prosecutor

=== Results ===
Democratic primary results
Party	Candidate	Votes	%
Democratic	Chris Mann	248,846	100.0
Total votes		248,846	100.0

== General election ==
=== Debate ===
2022 Kansas Attorney General debate
No.	Date	Host	Moderator	Link	Republican	Democratic
Key: P Participant A Absent N Not invited I Invited W Withdrawn						
Key: P Participant A Absent N Not invited I Invited W Withdrawn					Kris Kobach	Chris Mann
1	Oct. 25, 2022	KTWU; Washburn University; Department of Political Science	Nick Haines	YouTube	P	P

=== Predictions ===
Source	Ranking	As of
Sabato's Crystal Ball	Tossup	November 3, 2022
Elections Daily	Leans R	November 1, 2022

=== Post-primary endorsements ===
Kris Kobach (R)

U.S. Senators

- Roger Marshall, U.S. Senator from Kansas (2021–2027)

Organizations

- Kansans for Life PAC
- National Right to Life Committee
- NRA Political Victory Fund
Chris Mann (D)

U.S. Attorneys

- Stephen McAllister, former United States Attorney for the District of Kansas (2018–2021)

Sheriffs and police chiefs

- Ellen Hanson, former Lenexa police chief

Organizations

- American Federation of Teachers
- End Citizens United
- Kansas AFL-CIO
- Kansas Livestock Association
- Kansas State Council of Fire Fighters
- Let America Vote
- United Auto Workers Region 4

Newspapers

- The Kansas City Star
- The Wichita Eagle

=== Polling ===
Poll source	Date(s) administered	Sample size	Margin of error	Kris Kobach (R)	Chris Mann (D)	Other	Undecided
Emerson College	October 27–29, 2022	1,000 (LV)	± 3.0%	43%	44%	3% (Note: "Someone else" with 3%)	11%
Jayhawk Consulting (Note: Poll was sponsored by Patrick Schmidt's campaign for Kansas's 2nd congressional district)	October 10–12, 2022	500 (LV)	–	37%	38%	–	25%
Emerson College	September 15–18, 2022	1,000 (LV)	± 3.0%	41%	39%	–	16%
WPA Intelligence (R)	April 26–27, 2022	500 (LV)	± 4.4%	44%	41%	–	15%

=== Results ===
2022 Kansas Attorney General election
Party	Candidate	Votes	%	±%
Republican	Kris Kobach	506,817	50.80	▼8.18
Democratic	Chris Mann	490,925	49.20	▲8.18
Total votes		997,742	100.00	
Republican hold				

==== By congressional district ====
District	Kobach	Mann	Representative
1st	57%	43%	Tracey Mann
2nd	52%	48%	Jake LaTurner
3rd	41%	59%	Sharice Davids
4th	55%	45%	Ron Estes

== See also ==
- 2022 Kansas elections

== Notes ==
Partisan clients
