= Nile Dillmore =

American politician

Member of the Kansas House of Representatives from the 92nd district
- In office January 8, 2001 – September 5, 2013
- Preceded by: Douglas E. Johnston
- Succeeded by: John Carmichael

Personal details
- Born: September 4, 1947 (age 78) Neodesha, Kansas, U.S.
- Party: Democratic
- Spouse: Janet Miller
- Children: 3
- Education: Wichita State University

Nile J. Dillmore (born September 4, 1947) was a Democratic member of the Kansas House of Representatives, representing the 92nd district. Born in Neodesha, Kansas, Dillmore served from 2001 until his resignation on September 5, 2013, the day after his 66th birthday. His reason for leaving, he said, was that he "...wanted to look around for some other things to do."

Dillmore, who has his BBA from Wichita State University, currently works as a land/home development specialist and a supervisor of specialized assets at Emprise Bank.

He has been active in a number of organizations including Wichita Independent Neighborhoods, Wichita Alternative Correctional Housing Board, the Historic Midtown Citizen Association, Sedgwick County Community Corrections Advisory Board, and SRS Advisory Board of Alcohol and Drug Abuse.

== Committee membership ==
- Taxation
- Corrections and Juvenile Justice
- Financial Institutions
- Insurance (Ranking Member)
- Joint Committee on Information Technology

== Major donors ==
The top 5 donors to Dillmore's 2008 campaign:

1. Kansas National Education Assoc $1,000
2. Kansans for Lifesaving Cures $1,000
3. Kansas Credit Union Assoc $1,000
4. Kansas Assoc of Insurance & Financial Advisors $650
5. HSBC North America $600
