= Michael Capps (politician) =

American politician (born 1978)

Member of the Kansas House of Representatives from the 85th district
- In office July 28, 2018 – January 11, 2021
- Preceded by: Chuck Weber
- Succeeded by: Patrick Penn

Personal details
- Born: Michael Ray Capps; January 17, 1978 (age 48) Valley Center, Kansas
- Party: Republican
- Children: 1

Michael Capps is an American politician who was born in Wichita, Kansas. A Republican, he was a member of the Kansas House of Representatives for the 85th district from 2018 to 2021.

== Early life and family ==
Capps was born in 1978. In profile interviews, he reported that he was born and raised in the northwest Wichita suburb of Valley Center, by a single mother, and never knew his biological father until age 18. As a kid, he said, he participated in wrestling, but was not interested in sports, and preferred involvement with computers, software and gadgets. He reported graduating high school in 1996, subsequently becoming involved with his church, "mentoring disciple students."

Four years later, he joined the U.S. Air Force, serving around the globe, including in combat situations in the Middle East, until 2003. He indicated he was a radio operator on C-130 transports, including in combat service during the events of 9/11.

Capps reported that, when he returned to Kansas, he again became involved in his church. At age 27, he became a single father to a seven-year-old boy who was assigned to him while Capps volunteered with Big Brothers Big Sisters in 2005. Capps adopted the boy - the son of a disabled, terminally ill mother. However, she entered remission, and by mutual arrangement remained engaged with her son, who lived with his adoptive father, Capps, until adulthood.

== Business activity ==
Capps engaged in various businesses, particularly in computers and business consulting. He founded Integrated Technologies of Kansas ("itKansas" or "ITK"), a computer services firm, reportedly in 2005 (another report says 2008). The firm developed experience working in federal government support. In 2015, Capps sold ITK to Cybertron International, Inc., a larger local computer services firm, and became Cybertron's employee, as vice president of technology services, for less than a year.

In 2016, Capps reported that he was the CEO of Ray Alan and Associates, Inc., a "business coaching and consulting firm" serving "small business owners."

== Electoral career ==
=== 2016 ===
In 2016, Capps ran for the Kansas House of Representatives for the 95th District against incumbent Democrat Tom Sawyer. Each was unopposed in the primary. Sawyer won with 54.4% against 45.5% of the vote for Capps.

=== 2018 ===
In 2018, Capps filed to run for the seat in Kansas House District 97, using an address on South Chase Street, in south Wichita.

But, several months before the election, Chuck Weber, the incumbent Representative for House District 85 - a staunchly Republican district that includes parts of north Wichita, plus suburbs to the north (Bel Aire and Kechi) and Benton northeast of Wichita - decided to withdraw from his run for re-election.

Capps changed his campaign filing, and ran for the District 85 seat, instead, reporting his address as 3103 North Governeour, Wichita, with a mailing address of 6505 E Central Ave #110.

When Capps said he lived at the Governeour street address, a home which had been scheduled to be sold at auction on June 27, 2018, Democrats complained it was not Capps' true address. However, the state Objections Board, all Republicans - Lieutenant Governor Tracey Mann, Kansas Attorney General Derek Schmidt, and Kansas Secretary of State Kris Kobach - refused to uphold the complaint.

In 2018, Capps reported that he was endorsed by the Kansas Chamber of Commerce, Family Policy Alliance of Kansas, and Kansans for Life.

During the summer before the election, incumbent Weber resigned his 85th District seat in the Legislature, effective July 14, 2018. The Sedgwick County Republican Central Committee appointed candidate Capps to fill the remainder of Weber's 85th District term, while Capps was running for that seat, though the legislature did not meet during those months.

==== Abuse allegations ====
Not long after Capps's appointment to the vacant seat, allegations of child abuse surfaced. The Kansas GOP cut ties with Capps after it was revealed that the Kansas Department of Children and Families (DCF) had found him responsible for emotional abuse of boys, in 2017, in his work as a volunteer Court-appointed special advocate (CASA). Capps denied the allegations, countering that the agency had investigated him in retaliation for his reporting of a foster parent's misconduct. (The agency's findings against Capps were reversed by the state Office of Administrative Hearings, which found them "unsubstantiated", and cited DCF procedural errors). The local CASA office said it suspended Capps from his role. He resigned from CASA, and was subsequently decertified from the work.

Republican Speaker of the Kansas House of Representatives, Ron Ryckman Jr., asked him to withdraw from the November election race for his District 85 seat. "Unfortunately, he has chosen to remain a candidate," the party's letter said. "Mr. Capps has been made aware that his decision to stay in the race is not supported by the Kansas Republican Party."

==== State House elections ====
Capps won the 2018 election with 54% of the vote, to 46% for Democrat Monica Marks, but remained ostracized by his own party. In 2020, he lost the Republican primary to Patrick Penn, who received 74.4%, 3,349 votes.

=== 2019 ===
Capps was sworn in to serve a full two-year term as a Kansas State Representative on January 14. 2019. Prior to the start of the 2019 legislative session, Capps pre-filed his first piece of legislation, HB 2025, aimed at including a person who has filed a petition for adoption in the definition of an interested party in the child in need of care code. While HB 2025 never emerged from committee, Capps spoke frequently during the 2018 election campaign on the importance of reforming the Kansas Department of Children and Families. Capps also introduced HB 2285, a bill creating the Kansas legal tender act; providing for sales exemption from and modification for sales of specie legal tender. This was ultimately consolidated into other legislation passed in the 2019 session.

The Kansas Policy Institute gave him a 94% fiscally conservative evaluation in 2019.

== 2019 Wichita mayoral election slander allegations ==
=== Attack ad project ===
During a contested Wichita mayoral runoff nonpartisan election to be held on November 5, 2019, in an attack on the challenging candidate, Brandon Whipple, a Democrat, a salacious video appeared on-line. The anonymously produced and circulated video was created by Matthew Colborn at the behest of Wichita Republican political officeholders.

The video made a false claim of sexual harassment against Whipple. The allegation had, in fact, been copied word-for-word from an actual claim, made against an anonymous Republican state senator in a Kansas City Star article two years earlier.

=== Cover-up ===
Elaborate covers had allegedly been implemented by the perpetrators of the smear against Whipple, in Wyoming and New Mexico, where state laws permit registered agents for mail forwarders and corporation principals to conceal the actual identities of the parties they represent. An investigation by the Wichita Eagle revealed that the producer of the defamation was Capps. The video had been filmed a downtown Wichita office building that Capps shared with Wichita City Councilman James Clendenin, an alleged ally of the then-incumbent mayor, Jeff Longwell.

After the Sedgwick County, Kansas Republican party chair, Dalton Glasscock, publicly called for Capps to resign, Capps then falsely claimed, less than two days before the November 2019 election, that it was Glasscock who had actually approved the production of the video, an allegation which Glasscock denied.

However, in August 2020, Colborn originally said that he was first approached by Glasscock to make the video, for which he was given a script and promised $20,000 for the work. Colborn further said that Capps had nothing to do with the making of the video, but that Sedgwick County Commissioner Michael O'Donnell, provided him with the intended script. Colborn said he was paid by a $10,000 check drawn on a firm owned by Capps. Glasscock truthfully denied any role in the making of the video.

When a Wichita Eagle reporter went to the claimed Capps' residence in the wake of the October 2019 accusations about the fabricated attack video against Whipple, an unidentified young man living in the home said he was "house sitting" and hadn't seen Capps "in a while."

=== Initial lawsuit ===
Whipple, who was elected Wichita mayor, sued videographer Colborn and two unnamed parties for slander. In his suit, others were subpoenaed to testify. O'Donnell, who faced reelection on November 3, 2020, was subpoenaed and was scheduled to give testimony by October 15, 2020, though conditions specified in the judge's order made it unlikely that it would be made public before election day. O'Donnell and Clendenin admitted they raised the money for the smear but had been misled to believe it was going to be used for billboard rentals.

After the Wichita Eagle investigation revealed Capps involvement in the attack ad project, Sedgwick County Republican Party leaders unanimously decided to make a public demand for Capps to resign. Capps, however, when informed before the announcement, November 1, 2019, threatened to drop a "nuclear bomb" on the local party leaders if they followed through on the plan - "naming" people, threatening to bring down the whole party with him. A surreptitious audio recording of the exchange had been made by Colburn, but would not become public for nearly a year.

Two days later, on November 3, 2019, Capps met with co-conspirators Michael O'Donnell (by then Sedgwick County Commissioner) and Wichita City Councilperson James Clendenin, to find a way to attribute the blame for the ad on the county party chair, Glasscock. Unbeknownst to the three elected public officials, that meeting too, was secretly recorded by a fourth party—their video producer Colborn—for which evidence would emerge in late October, 2020.

=== 2020 lawsuit and recordings revealed ===
==== Investigation and charges ====
In February 2020—represented by the area's former U.S. Attorney, Randy Rathbun—now-Mayor Whipple brought suit against the person who produced the video, Matthew Colborn, and an obscure group calling itself "Protect Wichita Girls, LLC." In the process, Whipple's attorney issued a subpoena for e-mails between O'Donnell and Sedgwick County Republican Party Chair Glasscock.

In October 2020, through Rathbun, Whipple amended the defamation and conspiracy lawsuit to include Capps, O'Donnell (now Sedgwick County Commissioner), and Wichita City Councilman James Clendenin as defendants. The suit alleged that the co-conspirators attempted to blame their complex, interstate conspiracy on the Sedgwick County Republican Chairman, Dalton Glasscock. It also alleged that they attempted to create marital discord in Whipple's own family, through false allegations.

The amended lawsuit further asserted that O'Donnell wrote the script for the false ad, Clendenin raised money for promoting it, and Capps attempted to hide their identities by creating a cover organization in New Mexico.

==== Audio recording revelations ====
On October 23, 2020, a secret audio recording emerged of a meeting of the alleged conspirators, with their video producer, Colburn (who secretly recorded the meeting), discussing the attack ad project and cover-up. Extensive excerpts of the recording were published in the local newspaper and played on local television, showing that the three Republicans had, indeed, conspired largely as alleged, with O'Donnell heard saying:

"Like I’ve always learned in politics, it's always avoid the truth at all expense, right? And just go on the attack."

Whole copies and excerpts (audio and print), of the secret recording, were published online by local media, including the city's main newspaper, the Wichita Eagle and Wichita's CBS-TV affiliate KWCH-TV.

==== Removal or resignation demands and inquiry ====
The revelation prompted immediate condemnations from throughout the Wichita area, including calls from three of O'Donnell's four fellow County Commissioners (mostly Republican) for O'Donnell to resign, and withdraw from his re-election race.

Similar demands were made by the Sedgwick County Republican Party, which announced on social media, October 24, 2020:

"This week's events bring to a head the malicious and dishonest actions of Michael Capps, Michael O’Donnell, and James Clendenin over the past year. We have stated from the beginning that this type of politics and actions would not be supported by the Sedgwick County Republican Party. We have said, and repeat, that those involved in this video ad campaign and the misinformation campaign are not fit to serve in public office and should step down." The Wichita Regional Chamber of Commerce, and its political action committee, concurred.

On October 25–26, the Sedgwick County District Attorney announced a joint investigation—by his office, the Wichita Police Department and the Sedgwick County Sheriff’s Department—into whether Capps and his co-conspirators could be forced from public office. State statutes prevent the legal ouster of a state official within 180 days before the end of their term in office, or within 120 days after its start—with the result that Capps, and co-conspirator O'Donnell (who was running for re-election) were immune from normal ouster proceedings until the election, and—if O'Donnell were re-elected—immune from such proceedings during the first 120 days of his new term (Capps had been defeated in his primary election bid for re-election).

==== Capps threats revealed ====
By October 26, Sedgwick County Republican Party leaders released an audio recording of Capps' November 1. 2019 confrontation and threats.

=== Official reactions ===
==== Congressman Estes ====
October 26, 2020, U.S. Congressman Ron Estes, a Wichita Republican who represented Kansas's 4th congressional district (which included the districts of Capps, O'Donnell and Clendenin), called for their resignations.

==== Wichita City Council Condemnation ====
During the next weekly Wichita City Council meeting, October 27, 2020, the council voted 5–0 to censure Capps co-conspirator Clendinin, a City Council member. (Clendenin and Mayor Whipple recused themselves from the discussion and vote.) However, the council remained divided on whether to call for Clendenin to resign. The council also voted to condemn Capps and O’Donnell for their roles in the plot. On December 22, Clendenin resigned his seat, effective December 31, 2020.

==== Sedgwick County Commission ====
The next day, the Sedgwick County Commission unanimously (O'Donnell abstaining) passed a resolution censuring O’Donnell and formally requesting his resignation. The resolution also said that if O’Donnell were to win re-election in the next week's election, he should decline to serve the new term.

==== Sedgwick County District Attorney ====
On November 25, Mark Bennett, the Sedgwick County D.A. moved to have the state take up the case of the removal of Capps from office, since the D.A. is precluded from doing so by statute.

==== Kansas Attorney General ====
Responding to a petition from Sedgwick County District Attorney Marc Bennett, Kansas Attorney General Derek Schmidt responded that he lacked the authority to remove Capps. per state law, which allows only four methods for removal of a state representative: Defeat in an election; expiration of the official's term of office; recall election; or expulsion by a vote of the state House of Representatives. He noted that state law forbids recall elections in the last 200 days of a representative's term. He also noted that, because the legislature would not meet before the election, the Legislature could not oust Capps, either.

== COVID-19 relief fraud and money laundering charges ==
In December, 2020, the Wichita Eagle published an analysis of public records and other sources that purported to indicate that Capps and his business partner, Wichita City Council member Clendenin, had acquired federal, state and county government financial aid that was primarily intended to assist businesses suffering from the COVID-19 pandemic, beyond what they should have been eligible for - a total of $495,200 - possibly fraudulently. The report revealed that Capps and Clendenin had apparently acquired the funds to ostensibly pay salaries of nonexistent employees.

The enterprises for which Capps sought money were Midwest Business Group LLC, Krivacy LLC, and the Fourth and Long Foundation — the same entities used to make the false attacks against Mayoral candidate Brandon Whipple in 2019. Capps said that, following his closure of the Fourth and Long Foundation on October 19, 2020, he was attempting to return the $95,000 it had received from the U.S. Small Business Administration.

Sedgwick County District Attorney Marc Bennett confirmed that his office had been investigating the situation since September 2020. Within days of the Eagle's publication of their findings, Sedgwick County Commissioner David Dennis urged County officials to audit County funds given to Capps' enterprises, and if appropriate, demand their return.

In September 2021, Capps was indicted by a federal grand jury on nineteen counts of fraud and money laundering pertaining to COVID-19 relief funds, and state and local economic development funds. According to the United States Attorney's Office for the District of Kansas, Capps defrauded government agencies for more than $450,000, supposedly payroll for nonexistent employees.

On December 21, 2022, Capps was found guilty of 12 of 18 counts by the jury. (One of the original 19 charges was dismissed at beginning of the trial.)

The businesses and nonprofit organizations served to launder a dark money campaign that falsely smeared mayoral candidate Brandon Whipple, a Democrat who won that seat. The funding for that video was provided by construction and real estate interests which supported former Wichita Mayor Jeff Longwell, a Republican. The video was filmed at the Midwest Business Group office. Krivacy registered a domain name (protectwichitagirls.com) before the video was published online. Those donors underwrote the faked video by writing checks to the nonprofit Fourth and Long, Foundation, a 501(c)(3) supposed youth sports charity. That allowed the payments to be kept anonymous and declared by the underwriters as ostensibly tax deductible. Mayor Whipple sued Capps plus James Clendenin and former Sedgwick County Commissioner Michael O'Donnell in state court for defamation. The convictions mean that Capps could be fined millions of dollars as well as being sentenced to decades in prison.

=== Verdict ===
The jury found Capps guilty on three counts of making false statements to apply for loans through the Paycheck Protection Program and the Small Business Administration (SBA). Applying for Economic Injury Disaster Loans (EIDL) with the SBA and Working Capital Grant loans from the Kansas Department of Commerce, convictions said Capps lied about the number of employees he had and the revenue brought in through ventures that include Krivacy, LLC, and the Fourth and Long Foundation.' He was also convicted of making a false statement to a bank for a PPP Loan, as well as lying about employee numbers and incoming revenue.

The jury also found Capps guilty of one count of bank fraud, four counts of wire fraud, and four counts of money laundering. The jury acquitted Capps on one count of making a false statement, one count of wire fraud, and four counts of money laundering. A sixth count of wire fraud, in addition to the four convictions and one acquittal, was dismissed, court records show.

On May 11, 2023, Capps was sentenced by Federal Judge Eric Melgren to 27 months in federal prison followed by two years of supervised release. That was considerably less than the 51 months of incarceration for which the U.S. Attorney had asked. Capps was also sentenced to pay a $318,647.21 fine and to the forfeiture of $178,193.17 he had gained in illegal proceeds.

Convicted on 12 counts, Capps appealed the sentence to the 10th Circuit Court of Appeals. On August 13, 2024, the appellate division found against Capps, who had moved to Oklahoma while his appeal was pending. The prosecution also found that he had established residence in Panama, in an effort to retain the proceeds of his swindling of the Federal government and to prevent recapture of those ill-gotten gains. However, because of court-ordered restrictions he had been unable to maintain that residence status since Panama requires visiting that country a minimum of once every two years.

== Former employer lawsuit victory ==
In January 2022, former Capps' employer Cybertron was awarded $200,000 from Capps by a District Court Judge for violations of a non-compete agreement.
