= Chris Mann (politician) =

American politician (born 1976)

Attorney General-elect of Kansas
- Assuming office January 11, 2027
- Governor: Cindy Holscher (elect)
- Succeeding: Kris Kobach

Personal details
- Born: September 16, 1976 (age 50) Kansas, U.S.
- Party: Democratic
- Spouse: Ashley Mann
- Children: 2
- Education: University of Kansas (BA); Washburn University School of Law (JD)
- Website: Campaign website

Christopher Mann (born September 16, 1976) is an American politician, attorney, and former law enforcement officer from Kansas. A member of the Democratic Party, he is the Kansas Attorney General-elect.

== Early life and career ==
Mann was born and raised in Olathe, Kansas, and is the son of a police officer. He graduated from Olathe East High School and attended the University of Kansas, earning a degree in psychology in 2002.

While attending college, Mann joined the Lawrence Police Department at age 21. At approximately 3:30 a.m. on January 11, 2002, he pulled over a vehicle with a broken taillight. A drunk driver hit his police car at 50 miles per hour (80 km/h), throwing Mann 30 feet (9.1 m) from the site of impact. He retired from the police force due to the resulting physical pain.

== Legal career ==
After working in business, real estate, and as a private investigator, Mann attended Washburn University School of Law and graduated with his Juris Doctor in 2010. He worked as a prosecutor in Wyandotte County from 2011 to 2013 and then worked as a special assistant attorney general covering the Kansas Securities Commission from 2014 to 2016.

In the mid-2010s, Mann opened the Mann Law Firm, where he practiced criminal defense and personal injury. He later joined Downing, Davey, Vokins, and Mann, LLC in Lawrence, where he represented victims of drunk driving. Mann volunteered with Mothers Against Drunk Driving and advocated for a law that requires people with a driving under the influence conviction to have an ignition interlock device in their vehicle.

== Political career ==
Mann ran for Attorney General of Kansas in the 2022 election as a member of the Democratic Party. He faced Kris Kobach in the general election and narrowly lost, 50.8% to 49.2%. Mann ran against Kobach again in the 2026 Kansas Attorney General election and defeated him.

== Personal life ==
Mann is married to Ashley Mann, a cardiothoracic surgeon. They have two children and live in Lawrence, Kansas.
