= Steve Brunk =

American politician

Member of the Kansas House of Representatives from the 85th district
- Incumbent
- Assumed office June 24, 2025
- Preceded by: Patrick Penn
- Succeeded by: Mackenzi Truelove (elect)
- In office January 13, 2003 – December 17, 2015
- Preceded by: Anthony J. Powell
- Succeeded by: Chuck Weber

Personal details
- Born: November 20, 1951 (age 74)
- Party: Republican
- Spouse: Billie
- Children: 2

Steven Brunk is an American politician who is a Republican member of the Kansas House of Representatives. He first represented the 85th district in the State of Kansas from 2003 to 2015. In 2018 he was rated 100% by the American Conservative Union. In 2025 he was appointed to a new term, again representing the 85th district.

== Biography ==
Brunk served in the 85th district of the Kansas House from 2003 to 2016.

Brunk resigned from the house to become the director of the Kansas Family Policy Alliance a group that advocates against abortion and same-sex marriage and for religion in government. However, he would quickly resign from his position and work in real estate. He attempted to stage a political comeback in 2018, running for a spot in the Sedgwick County Commission

Brunk staged another political comeback by being appointed to his old seat again, after Patrick Penn resigned to become undersecretary of the Department of Agriculture.
