= Mackenzi Truelove =

American politician

Member-elect of the Kansas House of Representatives from the 85th district
- Assuming office January 2027
- Succeeding: Steve Brunk

Personal details
- Party: Democratic

Mackenzi Truelove is an American politician. A member of the Democratic Party, she is the member-elect for the 85th district of the Kansas House of Representatives.
