= John Carmichael (Kansas politician) =

American politician

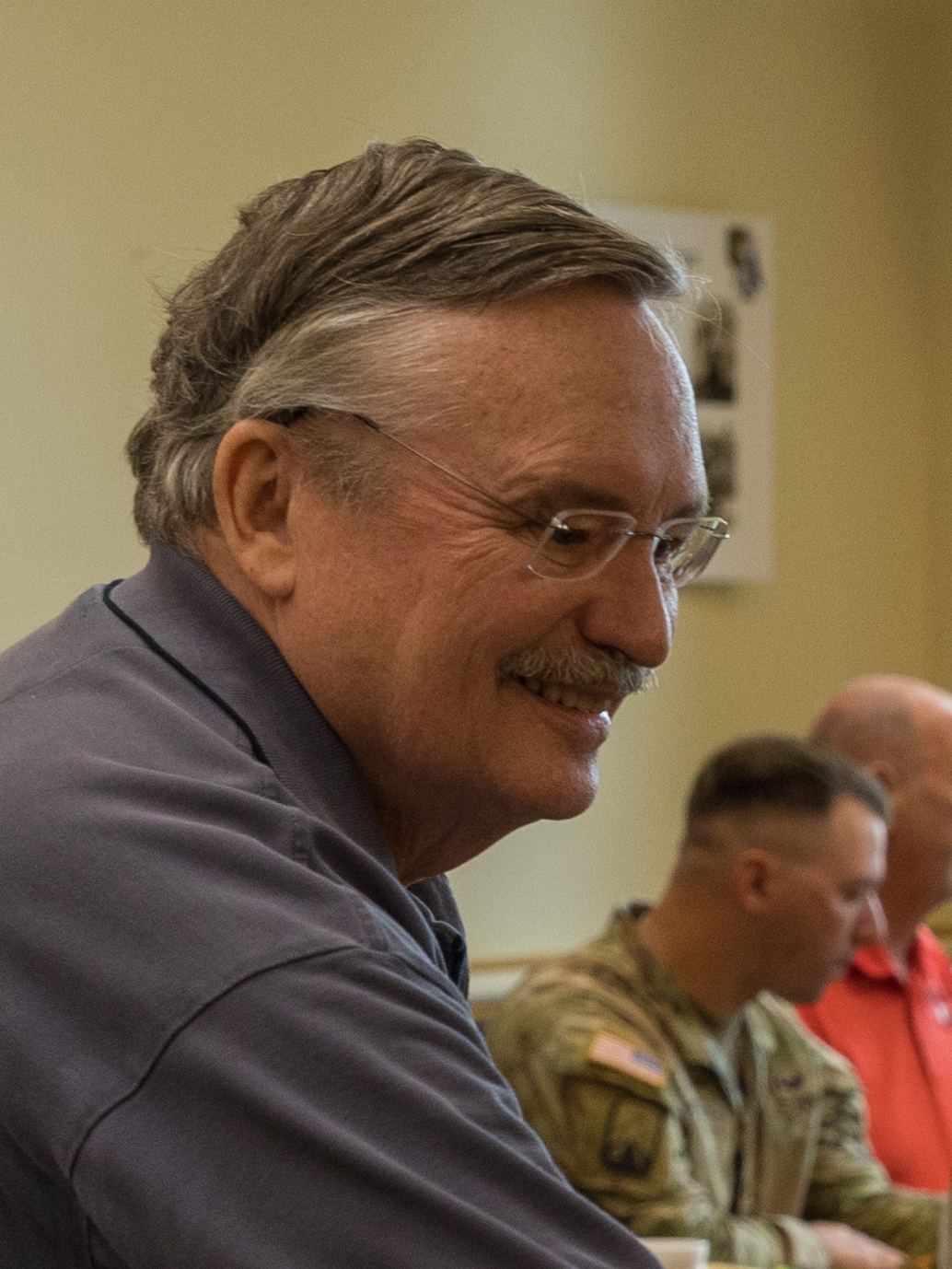
- Carmichael in 2023

Member of the Kansas House of Representatives from the 92nd district
- Incumbent
- Assumed office October 16, 2013
- Preceded by: Nile Dillmore

Personal details
- Born: July 2, 1957 (age 69) Wichita, Kansas, U.S.
- Party: Democratic
- Spouse: Cheryl Carmichael
- Education: Wichita State University; University of Kansas
- Profession: Lawyer

John Carmichael (born July 2, 1957) is an American politician. He has served as a Democratic member for the 92nd district in the Kansas House of Representatives since 2013.

== Early life ==
Carmichael was born in Wichita, Kansas. He graduated from Wichita State University and from the University of Kansas law school. He resides in Riverside, Kansas. He earned degrees from Wichita State University and the University of Kansas law school. He was appointed to the Governor’s Committee on Kansas Libraries by Governor Joan Finney.

== Career ==
Carmichael practices law in Wichita, Kansas. He has held a number of civic positions, including serving as the former chair of the Kansas Commission on Peace Officer Standards and Training, the former state secretary, Kansas Democratic Party, the former chair of the Kansas Fourth Congressional District Democrats, the former chair of the Kansas Human Rights Commission.[1] In 2006 he was the founder of the Sedgwick County Voter Protection Poll Monitoring Program. He is an adjunct member of the faculty of Wichita State University.

== Tenure ==
When the Republican supermajority houses of the legislature passed a billion dollar tax exemption for an unnamed corporation in an unrevealed industry, Carmichael's facetious comment was that for all the legislature and public knew, the state might be subsidizing "a pornographic film production studio" and roles for adult-film actors and camera crews. He continued. "The problem is, you don't know what kind of business you are betting your constituents' tax dollars and futures on."

== Elections ==
In 2014, Carmichael was unopposed in his primary and won the general election in House District 92 with 53.8% of the vote against Republican Jeremy Alessi. In 2016 and 2018, he won uncontested Democratic primary and general elections in the same district, without opposition. In 2020 he was again unopposed in the primary, and won the general election with 57.6% of the vote against Republican Patrick Mahoney. In 2022 he was again unopposed in both the primary and the general election.

== Personal ==
Carmichael lives in the Riverside district of Wichita, Kansas.
