= Chuck Weber (politician) =

American politician

Member of the Kansas House of Representatives from the 85th district
- In office January 11, 2016 – July 14, 2018
- Preceded by: Steve Brunk
- Succeeded by: Michael Capps

Personal details
- Party: Republican
- Spouse: Cindy Weber (m. ~1985)
- Children: 5

Chuck Weber is an American politician who served in the Kansas House of Representatives as a Republican from 2016 to 2018.

Weber worked as a TV journalist before entering politics. He was appointed to the seat left vacant by the resignation of Steve Brunk, taking office on January 11, 2016. He won a full term in his own right in the 2016 elections, running unopposed in the primary election and taking 61% of the vote against Democrat Patty Beamer in November.

In 2018, Weber initially announced a run for re-election; however, he withdrew from the race and resigned his seat to become a lobbyist. As of 2023, Weber works as the director of the Kansas Catholic Conference, an organization that "serves as the official voice of the Roman Catholic Church in Kansas on matters of public policy".
