= 1996 United States Senate special election in Kansas =

- November 5, 1996
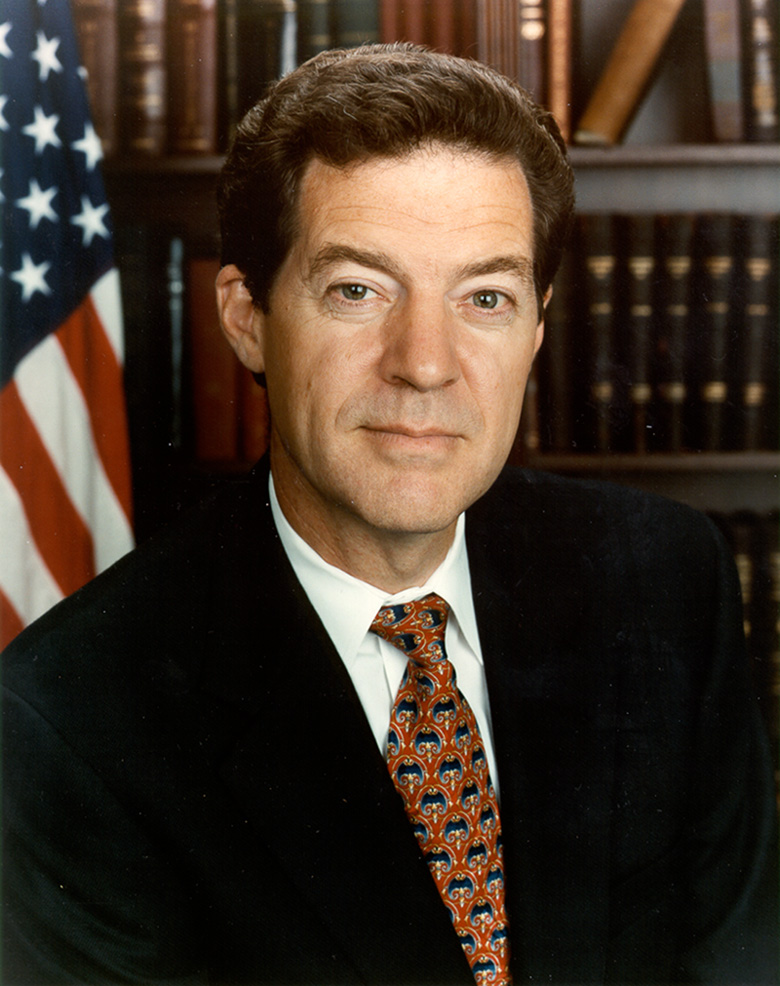

Nominee	Sam Brownback	Jill Docking
Party	Republican	Democratic
Popular vote	574,021	461,344
Percentage	53.91%	43.33%
- County results Brownback: 40–50% 50–60% 60–70% 70–80% Docking: 50–60% 60–70%
U.S. senator before election
Sheila Frahm
Republican
Elected U.S. Senator
Sam Brownback
Republican

The 1996 United States Senate special election in Kansas was held on November 5, 1996, concurrently with the presidential election and the regularly scheduled election for the state's Class 2 seat. Incumbent Republican U.S. Senator and Senate Majority Leader Bob Dole, the Republican nominee for president, had resigned on June 11, 1996, in order to focus on his presidential campaign. Lieutenant Governor Sheila Frahm was appointed to the seat upon Dole's resignation, but she was defeated in the primary by Representative Sam Brownback, who went on to win the general election over Democrat Jill Docking.

Brownback served in the U.S. Senate from 1996 to 2011 and later as governor of Kansas from 2011 to 2018; in his successful 2014 gubernatorial re-election campaign, he defeated the Democratic ticket, which included Docking as the nominee for lieutenant governor.

As of 2025, this is the last time a Democratic candidate won Cowley County as well as Ellis County in a US Senate election.

== Republican primary ==
=== Candidates ===
- Sam Brownback, U.S. congressman and former Kansas Secretary of Agriculture
- Christina Campbell-Cline, accountant
- Sheila Frahm, incumbent U.S. senator and former lieutenant governor of Kansas

=== Results ===
Republican primary results
Party	Candidate	Votes	%
Republican	Sam Brownback	187,914	54.82%
Republican	Sheila Frahm (incumbent)	142,487	41.57%
Republican	Christina Campbell-Cline	12,378	3.61%
Total votes		342,779	100.00%

== Democratic primary ==
=== Candidates ===
- Jill Docking, businesswoman and daughter-in-law of former Kansas Governor Robert Docking
- Joan Finney, former governor of Kansas and former Kansas State Treasurer

=== Results ===
Democratic primary results
Party	Candidate	Votes	%
Democratic	Jill Docking	127,012	74.39%
Democratic	Joan Finney	43,726	25.61%
Total votes		170,738	100.00%

== General election ==
=== Candidates ===
- Sam Brownback (R), U.S. congressman and former Kansas Secretary of Agriculture
- Jill Docking (D), businesswoman and daughter-in-law of former Kansas Governor Robert Docking
- Donald Klaassen (Reform), businessman

=== Results ===
General election results
Party	Candidate	Votes	%	±%
Republican	Sam Brownback	574,021	53.91%	−8.78%
Democratic	Jill Docking	461,344	43.33%	+12.30%
Reform	Donald R. Klaassen	29,351	2.76%	
Majority		112,677	10.58%	−21.08%
Turnout		1,064,716		
Republican hold		Swing		

== Aftermath ==
Brownback was re-elected to a first full term in 1998, and was re-elected again to a second full term in 2004. In 2010, Brownback was elected governor, and won a second term in 2014. He resigned as governor on January 31, 2018, to accept an ambassadorship, and was succeeded by Lieutenant Governor Jeff Colyer.

Brownback's seat is now held by Jerry Moran, a U.S. representative from Kansas' 1st district for seven terms (1997–2011).

Docking was the running mate of the Democratic nominee, state representative and Minority Leader Paul Davis, in the 2014 gubernatorial election.

== See also ==
- 1996 United States Senate elections
