= 2014 Kansas gubernatorial election =

- November 4, 2014
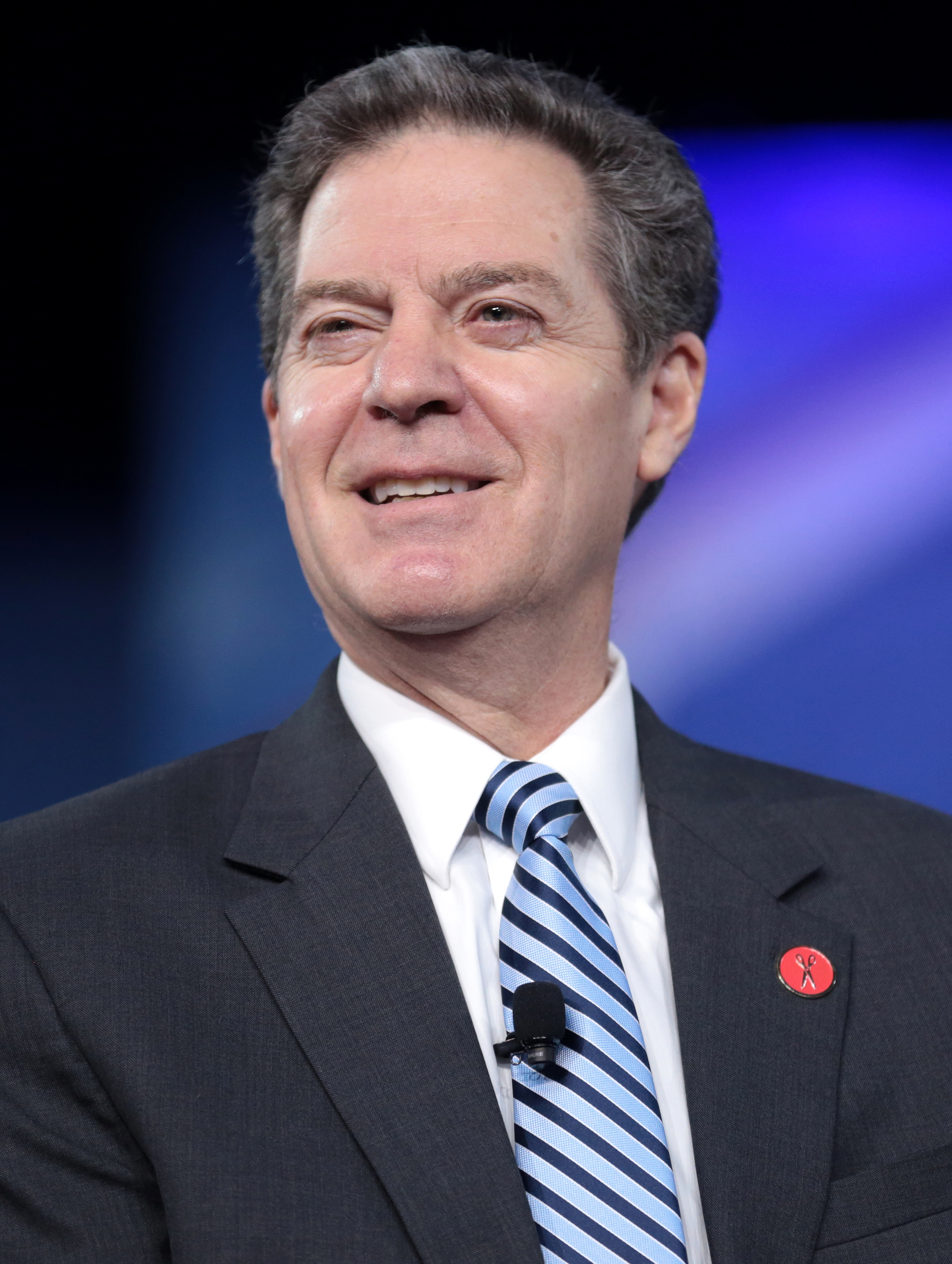

Nominee	Sam Brownback	Paul Davis
Party	Republican	Democratic
Running mate	Jeff Colyer	Jill Docking
Popular vote	433,196	401,100
Percentage	49.82%	46.13%
- Brownback: 40–50% 50–60% 60–70% 70–80% 80–90% Davis: 40–50% 50–60% 60–70% 70–80%
Governor before election
Sam Brownback
Republican
Elected Governor
Sam Brownback
Republican

The 2014 Kansas gubernatorial election took place on November 4, 2014, to elect the governor of Kansas. It was held concurrently with the election of Kansas' Class II U.S. Senate seat, elections to the United States Senate in other states, elections to the United States House of Representatives, and various state and local elections.

Incumbent Republican governor Sam Brownback ran for re-election to a second term. He was opposed in the general election by Democrat Paul Davis, the minority leader of the Kansas House of Representatives, and Libertarian attorney Keen Umbehr.

The election was viewed as a referendum on Brownback's aggressive tax cutting initiatives and his conservative values. The consensus among The Cook Political Report, Governing, The Rothenberg Political Report, Sabato's Crystal Ball, Daily Kos Elections, and others was that the contest was a tossup. Brownback won the election by a margin of 3.69%. Davis carried seven counties, all in eastern Kansas.

As of 2026, this is the last time a Republican, and a male was elected Governor of Kansas.

== Republican primary ==
=== Candidates ===
==== Declared ====
- Sam Brownback, incumbent governor

- Running mate: Jeff Colyer, incumbent lieutenant governor

- Jennifer Winn, businesswoman

- Running mate: Robin Lais, advertising agency owner and natural healing shop owner
- Former running mate: Ethan McCord, Iraq War veteran

==== Declined ====
- Kris Kobach, secretary of state of Kansas (ran for re-election)
- Steve Morris, former president of the Kansas Senate
- Sandy Praeger, Kansas Insurance Commissioner (endorsed Paul Davis)

=== Polling ===
Poll source	Date(s) administered	Sample size	Margin of error	Sam Brownback	Jennifer Winn	Undecided
SurveyUSA	July 17–22, 2014	691	± 3.7%	60%	30%	9%
SurveyUSA	June 19–23, 2014	508	± 4.4%	55%	37%	8%

=== Results ===
Results by county: Brownback: 50–60%; 60–70%; 70–80%; Winn: 50–60%

Republican primary results
Party	Candidate	Votes	%
Republican	Sam Brownback (incumbent)	166,687	63.2
Republican	Jennifer Winn	96,907	36.7
Total votes		263,594	100

== Democratic primary ==
=== Candidates ===
==== Declared ====
- Paul Davis, minority leader of the Kansas House of Representatives

- Running mate: Jill Docking, businesswoman, former member of the Kansas Board of Regents and nominee for the U.S. Senate in 1996 (running for lieutenant governor)

==== Declined ====
- Carl Brewer, mayor of Wichita
- Jill Docking
- Tom Holland, state senator and nominee for governor in 2010
- Deb Miller, former secretary of the Kansas Department of Transportation
- Stephen Morris, former Republican president of the Kansas Senate
- Mark Parkinson, former governor, president and CEO of the American Health Care Association and the National Center for Assisted Living
- Sandy Praeger, Republican Kansas Insurance Commissioner
- Joe Reardon, former mayor of Kansas City
- Joshua Svaty, vice president of The Land Institute and former Secretary of Agriculture of Kansas

=== Results ===
Democratic primary results
Party	Candidate	Votes	%
Democratic	Paul Davis	66,357	100
Total votes		66,357	100

== Libertarian nomination ==
=== Candidates ===
==== Declared ====
- Keen Umbehr, attorney

- Running mate: Josh Umbehr, physician and son of Keen Umbehr

== General election ==
=== Debates ===
- Complete video of debate, September 6, 2014 - C-SPAN
- Complete video of debate, October 21, 2014 - C-SPAN

=== Endorsements ===
Sam Brownback (R)

Republican politicians

- Terry Bruce, majority leader of the Kansas Senate
- Jan Meyers, former U.S. representative

Democratic politicians

- Nathan Barnes, former Wyandotte County commissioner

Other individuals

- Carly Fiorina, former CEO of Hewlett-Packard

Organizations

- Kansas Rifle Association
- National Federation of Independent Business
Paul Davis (D)

Democratic politicians

- Jill Docking, businesswoman, former member of the Kansas Board of Regents and nominee for the U.S. Senate in 1996
- Anthony Hensley, minority leader of the Kansas Senate
- John E. Moore, former lieutenant governor of Kansas

Republican politicians

- Barbara P. Allen, former state senator, former state representative and former assistant attorney general of Kansas
- Denise Apt, former state representative
- Jayne Aylward, former state representative
- Ginger Barr, former state representative
- Dick Bond, former member of the Kansas State Senate
- Ken Bower, former mayor of Leavenworth
- Jim Braden, former speaker of the Kansas House of Representatives
- Carol Brandert, member of the Salina Public Schools Board of Education
- Nancy Brown, former state representative, former member of the Kansas State Emergency Response Commission
- Pete Brungardt, former state senator and former mayor of Salina
- Mark Buhler, former state senator
- Bud Burke, former president of the Kansas Senate and former state representative
- David R. Corbin, former state senator
- Ray Cox, former state representative
- Val DeFever, former member of the Kansas State Board of Education
- Gary Denning, former member of the Salina Public Schools Board of Education and former Salina City prosecutor
- Brad Dillon, Reno County Commissioner and former Hutchinson city councilman
- David Drovetta, former mayor of Gardner and former Gardner city councilman
- Sandy Duncan, former state representative
- Nedra Elbl, chairwoman of the Salina Public Schools Board of Education and former president of the Kansas National Education Association
- Jane M. Eldredge, former state senator
- Roger Elliott, member of the Andover Public Schools Board of Education
- Tim Emert, member of the Kansas Board of Regents and former majority leader of the Kansas State
- Cindy Empson, former state representative
- Bill Falstad, former chairman of the Kansas Chamber of Commerce Board of Directors, former mayor of Fredonia and former chairman of the Kansas Republican Party
- Ron Fox, former state representative
- Bob Frey, former judge on the Kansas Board of Tax Appeals, former majority leader of the Kansas State and former state representative
- Fred Gatlin, former state representative
- Crosby Gernon, mayor of Hiawatha
- John Golden, former state representative
- John Grange, former state representative and former chairman of the El Dorado Public Schools Board of Education
- Howard Gray, superintendent of Pratt, Plains and Kismet
- Pat Grimwood, former member of the Salina Public Schools Board of Education
- Kristin Gunn, former mayor of Salina and former Salina city commissioner
- Steve Hale, former president of the Gardner-Edgerton USD 231 Board of Education and former Gardner city councilman
- Floris Jean Hampton, member of the Kansas Association of Community College Trustees Board of Regents and former member of the Kansas Board of Regents
- Randall Hardy, Salina city commissioner
- Joleen Hill, former member of the Manhattan–Ogden Board of Education
- Gennifer House, former president of the Goodland Public Schools Board of Education
- Dave Huff, former state representative
- Terrie Huntington, former state senator and former state representative
- William Kassebaum, former state representative and son of former U.S. senator Nancy Kassebaum
- Fred Kerr, former majority leader of the Kansas Senate
- Wendell Lady, former speaker of the Kansas House of Representatives
- Audrey Langworthy, former state senator
- Carol Lehman, former mayor of Gardner and former Gardner city councilwoman
- Fred Lorentz, former 31st Judicial District judge and former state representative
- Jim Lowther, former state representative
- Bob Marshall, former state senator
- R.D. "Bob" Miller, former member of the Kansas State Parole Board and former state representative
- Robert "R.H." Miller, former speaker of the Kansas House of Representatives
- Stephen Morris, former president of the Kansas Senate
- Lana Oleen, former majority leader of the Kansas Senate
- Bill Otto, former state representative
- Tim Owens, former state senator and former state representative
- Sandy Praeger, Kansas Insurance Commissioner
- Jill Quigley, former state representative
- Jim Randall, mayor pro tem of Olathe
- Gerry Ray, former state representative
- Roger Reitz, former state senator, former state representative and former mayor of Manhattan
- Marge Roberson, former mayor of Newton, former Newton city commissioner and former Harvey County commissioner
- Ed Rolfs, former Kansas secretary of revenue and former state representative
- Charles Roth, former state representative and former mayor of Salina
- Ellen Samuelson, former state representative
- Debbie Schauf, former state representative
- Gary Sherrer, former lieutenant governor of Kansas
- Shelby Smith, former lieutenant governor of Kansas
- Sheryl Spalding, former state representative and former regional vice president of the Kansas Association of School Boards
- Bob W. Storey, former state senator
- Ralph Tanner, former state representative
- Ruth Teichman, former state senator
- Lee Thompson, former United States Attorney for the District of Kansas
- Carolyn Tillotson, former state senator and former mayor of Leavenworth
- Dwayne Umbarger, former state senator
- John Vanier, former mayor of Salina and former Salina city commissioner
- John Vratil, former state senator
- Winton A. Winter, Jr., former state senator
- Robert S. Wunsch, former state representative
- David Wysong, former state senator and former Johnson County Commissioner
- Jim Yonally, former state representative

Organizations

- Traditional Republicans for Common Sense

=== Predictions ===
Source	Ranking	As of
The Cook Political Report	Tossup	November 3, 2014
Sabato's Crystal Ball	Lean D (flip)	November 3, 2014
Rothenberg Political Report	Tossup	November 3, 2014
Real Clear Politics	Tossup	November 3, 2014

=== Polling ===
Poll source	Date(s) administered	Sample size	Margin of error	Sam Brownback (R)	Paul Davis (D)	Keen Umbehr (L)	Other	Undecided
Public Policy Polling	November 1–3, 2014	963	± 3.2%	45%	46%	4%	—	4%
Public Policy Polling	November 1–3, 2014	963	± 3.2%	47%	48%	—	—	3%
Public Policy Polling	October 30–31, 2014	752	± ?	44%	48%	5%	—	3%
YouGov	October 25–31, 2014	1,137	± 4.8%	39%	38%	2%	1%	21%
Fox News	October 28–30, 2014	907	± 3%	42%	48%	4%	<1%	5%
Survey USA	October 22–26, 2014	623	± 4%	43%	46%	5%	—	7%
CBS News/NYT/YouGov	October 16–23, 2014	1,973	± 4%	43%	40%	—	1%	16%
NBC News/Marist	October 18–22, 2014	757 LV	± 3.6%	44%	45%	5%	1%	6%
NBC News/Marist	October 18–22, 2014	1,055 RV	± 3%	43%	43%	6%	1%	7%
Rasmussen Reports	October 20–21, 2014	960	± 3%	45%	52%	—	1%	2%
Gravis Marketing	October 20–21, 2014	1,124	± 3%	44%	49%	—	—	7%
Monmouth University	October 16–19, 2014	429	± 4.7%	45%	50%	—	2%	5%
Remington Research	October 9–12, 2014	1,091	± 2.97%	48%	45%	3%	—	4%
Public Policy Polling	October 9–12, 2014	1,081	± 3%	42%	42%	6%	—	10%
Public Policy Polling	October 9–12, 2014	1,081	± 3%	44%	45%	—	—	12%
Fox News	October 4–7, 2014	702	± 3.5%	46%	40%	2%	2%	11%
CNN/ORC	October 2–6, 2014	687	± 3.5%	49%	49%	—	—	2%
SurveyUSA	October 2–5, 2014	549	± 4.3%	42%	47%	4%	—	7%
Gravis Marketing	September 30–October 1, 2014	850	± 3%	40%	48%	—	—	12%
NBC News/Marist	September 27–October 1, 2014	636 LV	± 3.9%	43%	44%	4%	1%	7%
NBC News/Marist	September 27–October 1, 2014	1,097 RV	± 3%	41%	43%	5%	1%	10%
CBS News/NYT/YouGov	September 20–October 1, 2014	2,013	± 3%	45%	42%	—	0%	12%
Suffolk University	September 27–30, 2014	500	± 4.4%	42%	46%	6%	—	7%
Fort Hays State University	September 10–27, 2014	685	± 3.8%	37%	39%	9%	—	16%
Remington Research	September 23, 2014	625	± 3.91%	44%	46%	5%	—	5%
Rasmussen Reports	September 16–17, 2014	750	± 4%	43%	47%	—	4%	6%
Fox News	September 14–16, 2014	604	± 4%	41%	45%	4%	—	8%
Public Policy Polling	September 11–14, 2014	1,328	± 2.7%	38%	42%	7%	—	14%
Public Policy Polling	September 11–14, 2014	1,328	± 2.7%	39%	45%	—	—	15%
KSN/SurveyUSA	September 4–7, 2014	555	± 4.2%	40%	47%	5%	—	7%
CBS News/NYT/YouGov	August 18–September 2, 2014	839	± 5%	47%	40%	—	2%	11%
SurveyUSA	August 20–23, 2014	560	± 4.2%	40%	48%	5%	—	6%
Public Policy Polling	August 14–17, 2014	903	± 3.3%	37%	39%	9%	—	15%
Rasmussen Reports	August 6–7, 2014	750	± 4%	41%	51%	—	3%	5%
CBS News/NYT/YouGov	July 5–24, 2014	1,274	± 6.1%	52%	40%	—	3%	5%
SurveyUSA	July 17–22, 2014	1,208	± 2.9%	40%	48%	5%	—	7%
SurveyUSA	June 19–23, 2014	1,068	± 3.1%	41%	47%	—	5%	7%
Rasmussen Reports	April 16–17, 2014	750	± 4%	47%	40%	—	6%	7%
Public Policy Polling	April 1–2, 2014	886	± 3.1%	41%	45%	—	—	14%
Public Policy Polling	February 18–20, 2014	693	± 3.7%	40%	42%	—	—	18%
Wilson Perkins Allen	January 29, 2014	?	± ?	42%	31%	—	—	27%
SurveyUSA	October 23–24, 2013	511	± 4.4%	39%	43%	—	12%	6%

Hypothetical polling

Poll source	Date(s) administered	Sample size	Margin of error	Sam Brownback (R)	Carl Brewer (D)	Other	Undecided
Public Policy Polling	February 21–24, 2013	1,229	± 2.8%	44%	40%	—	15%

Poll source	Date(s) administered	Sample size	Margin of error	Sam Brownback (R)	Tom Holland (D)	Other	Undecided
Public Policy Polling	February 21–24, 2013	1,229	± 2.8%	45%	38%	—	17%

Poll source	Date(s) administered	Sample size	Margin of error	Sam Brownback (R)	Mark Parkinson (D)	Other	Undecided
Public Policy Polling	February 21–24, 2013	1,229	± 2.8%	45%	39%	—	16%

Poll source	Date(s) administered	Sample size	Margin of error	Sam Brownback (R)	Joe Reardon (D)	Other	Undecided
Public Policy Polling	February 21–24, 2013	1,229	± 2.8%	45%	36%	—	19%

Poll source	Date(s) administered	Sample size	Margin of error	Sam Brownback (R)	Kathleen Sebelius (D)	Other	Undecided
Public Policy Polling	February 21–24, 2013	1,229	± 2.8%	48%	43%	—	9%

Poll source	Date(s) administered	Sample size	Margin of error	Sam Brownback (R)	Chad Taylor (D)	Other	Undecided
Public Policy Polling	February 21–24, 2013	1,229	± 2.8%	44%	34%	—	22%

=== Results ===
2014 Kansas gubernatorial election
Party	Candidate	Votes	%	±%
Republican	Sam Brownback (incumbent)	433,196	49.82%	−13.46%
Democratic	Paul Davis	401,100	46.13%	+13.92%
Libertarian	Keen Umbehr	35,206	4.05%	+1.37%
Total votes		869,502	100.00%	N/A
Republican hold				

==== By county ====
County	San Brownback Republican		Paul Davis Democratic		Keen Umbehr Libertarian		Margin		Total
County	#	%	#	%	#	%	#	%	Total
Allen	2,268	50.85%	1,981	44.42%	211	4.73%	287	6.43%	4,460
Anderson	1,484	57.72%	940	36.56%	147	5.72%	544	21.16%	2,571
Atchison	2,461	51.61%	2,129	44.65%	178	3.73%	332	6.96%	4,768
Barber	1,157	66.15%	520	29.73%	72	4.12%	637	36.42%	1,749
Barton	4,973	61.58%	2,769	34.29%	334	4.14%	2,204	27.29%	8,076
Bourbon	3,010	59.60%	1,844	36.51%	196	3.88%	1,166	23.09%	5,050
Brown	1,825	57.03%	1,236	38.63%	139	4.34%	589	18.41%	3,200
Butler	11,803	56.83%	8,006	38.55%	961	4.63%	3,797	18.28%	20,770
Chase	586	54.21%	440	40.70%	55	5.09%	146	13.51%	1,081
Chautauqua	758	68.17%	280	25.18%	74	6.65%	478	42.99%	1,112
Cherokee	3,552	58.82%	2,262	37.46%	225	3.73%	1,290	21.36%	6,039
Cheyenne	804	75.63%	219	20.60%	40	3.76%	585	55.03%	1,063
Clark	556	66.99%	240	28.92%	34	4.10%	316	38.07%	830
Clay	1,872	59.56%	1,125	35.79%	146	4.65%	747	23.77%	3,143
Cloud	1,889	58.98%	1,176	36.72%	138	4.31%	713	22.26%	3,203
Coffey	1,818	57.55%	1,167	36.94%	174	5.51%	651	20.61%	3,159
Comanche	462	67.94%	187	27.50%	31	4.56%	275	40.44%	680
Cowley	4,769	48.40%	4,618	46.87%	466	4.73%	151	1.53%	9,853
Crawford	4,652	43.31%	5,732	53.37%	356	3.31%	-1,080	-10.06%	10,740
Decatur	904	73.32%	292	23.68%	37	3.00%	612	49.64%	1,233
Dickinson	3,824	59.31%	2,204	34.18%	420	6.51%	1,620	25.12%	6,448
Doniphan	1,491	65.80%	668	29.48%	107	4.72%	823	36.32%	2,266
Douglas	9,545	25.16%	27,424	72.28%	974	2.57%	-17,879	-47.12%	37,943
Edwards	766	66.55%	347	30.15%	38	3.30%	419	36.40%	1,151
Elk	622	56.80%	401	36.62%	72	6.58%	221	20.18%	1,095
Ellis	5,072	53.25%	4,085	42.89%	368	3.86%	987	10.36%	9,525
Ellsworth	1,258	54.86%	925	40.34%	110	4.80%	333	14.52%	2,293
Finney	4,144	61.05%	2,406	35.44%	238	3.51%	1,738	25.60%	6,788
Ford	3,824	61.82%	2,088	33.75%	274	4.43%	1,736	28.06%	6,186
Franklin	4,166	52.93%	3,285	41.74%	420	5.34%	881	11.19%	7,871
Geary	2,574	51.19%	2,200	43.75%	254	5.05%	374	7.44%	5,028
Gove	810	71.49%	286	25.24%	37	3.27%	524	46.25%	1,133
Graham	743	63.78%	365	31.33%	57	4.89%	378	32.45%	1,165
Grant	1,157	65.11%	507	28.53%	113	6.36%	650	36.58%	1,777
Gray	1,113	67.91%	452	27.58%	74	4.51%	661	40.33%	1,639
Greeley	383	68.39%	154	27.50%	23	4.11%	229	40.89%	560
Greenwood	1,365	61.02%	745	33.30%	127	5.68%	620	27.72%	2,237
Hamilton	462	64.98%	226	31.79%	23	3.23%	236	33.19%	711
Harper	1,234	61.61%	671	33.50%	98	4.89%	563	28.11%	2,003
Harvey	5,840	50.03%	5,454	46.73%	378	3.24%	386	3.31%	11,672
Haskell	774	73.57%	242	23.00%	36	3.42%	532	50.57%	1,052
Hodgeman	636	74.56%	195	22.86%	22	2.58%	441	51.70%	853
Jackson	2,315	47.92%	2,296	47.53%	220	4.55%	19	0.39%	4,831
Jefferson	3,073	46.79%	3,246	49.43%	248	3.78%	-173	-2.63%	6,567
Jewell	747	66.70%	296	26.43%	77	6.88%	451	40.27%	1,120
Johnson	94,787	49.18%	92,416	47.95%	5,549	2.88%	2,371	1.23%	192,752
Kearny	716	71.31%	262	26.10%	26	2.59%	454	45.22%	1,004
Kingman	1,724	60.07%	1,002	34.91%	144	5.02%	722	25.16%	2,870
Kiowa	608	67.41%	259	28.71%	35	3.88%	349	38.69%	902
Labette	3,017	52.57%	2,492	43.42%	230	4.01%	525	9.15%	5,739
Lane	509	66.80%	220	28.87%	33	4.33%	289	37.93%	762
Leavenworth	10,217	51.16%	8,872	44.42%	882	4.42%	1,345	6.73%	19,971
Lincoln	737	62.51%	400	33.93%	42	3.56%	337	28.58%	1,179
Linn	1,978	64.10%	977	31.66%	131	4.24%	1,001	32.44%	3,086
Logan	766	72.74%	236	22.41%	51	4.84%	530	50.33%	1,053
Lyon	3,520	39.15%	5,053	56.20%	418	4.65%	-1,533	-17.05%	8,991
Marion	2,553	57.79%	1,634	36.99%	231	5.23%	919	20.80%	4,418
Marshall	1,990	53.48%	1,563	42.00%	168	4.51%	427	11.48%	3,721
McPherson	5,561	54.75%	4,183	41.18%	414	4.08%	1,378	13.57%	10,158
Meade	994	69.51%	381	26.64%	55	3.85%	613	42.87%	1,430
Miami	6,107	58.01%	4,021	38.20%	399	3.79%	2,086	19.82%	10,527
Mitchell	1,464	62.89%	765	32.86%	99	4.25%	699	30.03%	2,328
Montgomery	5,495	63.07%	2,853	32.74%	365	4.19%	2,642	30.32%	8,713
Morris	1,000	47.35%	912	43.18%	200	9.47%	88	4.17%	2,112
Morton	597	65.89%	268	29.58%	41	4.53%	329	36.31%	906
Nemaha	2,616	62.24%	1,444	34.36%	143	3.40%	1,172	27.88%	4,203
Neosho	2,644	54.35%	2,007	41.25%	214	4.40%	637	13.09%	4,865
Ness	880	74.58%	260	22.03%	40	3.39%	620	52.54%	1,180
Norton	1,216	66.67%	518	28.40%	90	4.93%	698	38.27%	1,824
Osage	2,871	49.47%	2,573	44.33%	360	6.20%	298	5.13%	5,804
Osborne	919	63.60%	440	30.45%	86	5.95%	479	33.15%	1,445
Ottawa	1,500	63.88%	677	28.83%	171	7.28%	823	35.05%	2,348
Pawnee	1,126	52.49%	938	43.73%	81	3.78%	188	8.76%	2,145
Phillips	1,753	69.45%	633	25.08%	138	5.47%	1,120	44.37%	2,524
Pottawatomie	4,989	61.65%	2,633	32.54%	470	5.81%	2,356	29.12%	8,092
Pratt	1,719	54.57%	1,298	41.21%	133	4.22%	421	13.37%	3,150
Rawlins	872	75.30%	242	20.90%	44	3.80%	630	54.40%	1,158
Reno	9,772	51.25%	8,478	44.46%	819	4.29%	1,294	6.79%	19,069
Republic	1,290	63.99%	615	30.51%	111	5.51%	675	33.48%	2,016
Rice	1,769	59.42%	1,064	35.74%	144	4.84%	705	23.68%	2,977
Riley	6,784	43.79%	8,035	51.87%	673	4.34%	-1,251	-8.08%	15,492
Rooks	1,416	69.82%	506	24.95%	106	5.23%	910	44.87%	2,028
Rush	814	61.11%	452	33.93%	66	4.95%	362	27.18%	1,332
Russell	1,581	61.23%	867	33.58%	134	5.19%	714	27.65%	2,582
Saline	8,479	48.45%	7,830	44.74%	1,192	6.81%	649	3.71%	17,501
Scott	1,271	73.55%	385	22.28%	72	4.17%	886	51.27%	1,728
Sedgwick	69,868	48.94%	66,719	46.73%	6,187	4.33%	3,149	2.21%	142,774
Seward	2,225	67.53%	925	28.07%	145	4.40%	1,300	39.45%	3,295
Shawnee	23,621	38.14%	35,826	57.85%	2,482	4.01%	-12,205	-19.71%	61,929
Sheridan	776	73.07%	254	23.92%	32	3.01%	522	49.15%	1,062
Sherman	1,453	72.22%	479	23.81%	80	3.98%	974	48.41%	2,012
Smith	1,135	65.68%	509	29.46%	84	4.86%	626	36.23%	1,728
Stafford	950	62.34%	513	33.66%	61	4.00%	437	28.67%	1,524
Stanton	521	73.48%	161	22.71%	27	3.81%	360	50.78%	709
Stevens	946	66.67%	419	29.53%	54	3.81%	527	37.14%	1,419
Sumner	3,814	51.89%	3,146	42.80%	390	5.31%	668	9.09%	7,350
Thomas	1,747	64.46%	844	31.14%	119	4.39%	903	33.32%	2,710
Trego	764	64.15%	376	31.57%	51	4.28%	388	32.58%	1,191
Wabaunsee	1,443	50.28%	912	31.78%	515	17.94%	531	18.50%	2,870
Wallace	510	80.95%	93	14.76%	27	4.29%	417	66.19%	630
Washington	1,547	67.53%	641	27.98%	103	4.50%	906	39.55%	2,291
Wichita	596	78.11%	136	17.82%	31	4.06%	460	60.29%	763
Wilson	1,703	65.12%	806	30.82%	106	4.05%	897	34.30%	2,615
Woodson	613	56.86%	418	38.78%	47	4.36%	195	18.09%	1,078
Wyandotte	8,802	30.59%	18,928	65.78%	1,043	3.62%	-10,126	-35.19%	28,773
Totals	433,196	49.82%	401,100	46.13%	35,206	4.05%	32,096	3.69%	869,502

==== Counties that flipped from Republican to Democratic ====
- Crawford (largest city: Pittsburg)
- Jefferson (largest municipality: Valley Falls)
- Lyon (largest municipality: Emporia)
- Riley (largest municipality: Manhattan)
- Shawnee (largest municipality: Topeka)

==== By congressional district ====
Brownback won two of four congressional districts, with the remaining two going to Davis, which both elected Republicans.

District	Brownback	Davis	Representative
1st	57%	38%	Tim Huelskamp
2nd	45%	51%	Lynn Jenkins
3rd	47%	50%	Kevin Yoder
4th	51%	45%	Mike Pompeo
