= Traditional Republicans for Common Sense =

- Established: 2011
- Founder: Jim Yonally
- Founded at: Topeka, Kansas
- Defunct: 2014
- Type: Political pressure group
- Legal status: Inactive following the failure to defeat Sam Brownback in 2014.
- Purpose: Opposition to Sam Brownback and fiscal conservative policies
- Region served: Kansas
- Methods: Endorsements, Campaigning
- Chairman: Jim Yonally

The Traditional Republicans for Common Sense (TRCS) was a group of around 70 dissident Republican former members of the Kansas House of Representatives and Kansas Senate opposed to the policies of fellow Republican, the 46th Governor of Kansas, Sam Brownback, seeking to bring the party back into a moderate position.

== Background ==
The Kansas Republican Party had long been a stronghold of Moderates due to the longtime leadership and influence of Alf Landon and Bob Dole. However, the party would significantly swing rightward in a hyper-conservative direction with the election of Sam Brownback as the 46th Governor of Kansas during the 2010 election. Brownback planned to turn Kansas into a "conservative utopia" and implemented sweeping reforms as a sort of "test" for future national adoption dubbed the "Kansas experiment."

Brownback sought to implement the positions that the Koch Brothers wanted to see implemented nation-wide appointing a Koch affiliated Americans for Prosperity veteran Steve Anderson to draft his budget. Brownback later explained that his goal was to create "a red-state model that allows the Republican ticket to say, ‘See, we’ve got a different way, and it works.’" Brownback established an "Office of the Repealer" to slash spending by making welfare requirements more stringent, cut regulations on businesses, rejecting federal Medicaid subsidies and privatized the delivery of Medicaid, dissolving 4 state agencies and cutting 2,000 government jobs. Senate Minority Leader Mitch McConnell told Brownback that “This is exactly the sort of thing we want to do here, in Washington, but can’t, at least for now,” with Brownback also being groomed by the GOP establishment as a cannidate for the 2016 Republican Primaries.

Seeing national backing, and seemingly having Public support having won 63.28% in 2010. During the 2012 Kansas elections Brownback started a campaign against moderate elements within the Kansas Republican Party, openly caucusing for more conservatives alternatives to incumbent state Representatives and Senators. Brownback succeeded in ousting 8 moderate Republicans from the legislature and was able to push an ideologically pure agenda with almost no real opposition. With these moderates out of the way, he obtained the power to nominate judges and reduced tax cuts on the wealthy even more.

The Brownback backed Kansas Policy Institute predicted that his tax cuts would generate a $323 million windfall in revenue. But by June 2014, the results of Brownback's economic reforms began to come in and the state was operating under a $687.9 million loss in revenue with the Kansas Legislative Research Department warning that at the current rate the state would be in a deficit through 2019. Shortly after Moody's downgraded the state's credit rating from AA1 to AA2. Job growth slowed, the labor participation rate declined and the education system suffered.

== Formation ==
The TRCS was formed in late 2011 in the buildup to Brownback's re-election bid in 2014 which saw national importance due to the tight margins during the 2014 senate elections with the Republicans needing to pick up 5 senate seats to take control of the chamber. The group denounced Brownback's tax-cuts as stifling economic growth. The leading figure in the formation of the group was Jim Yonally, a retired school administrator and staunch supporter of John McCain, he wanted to preserve the role of nonpartisan commissions in nominating judges and ensure the state had enough money to operate properly. The group quickly represented the old party line of the Kansas GOP, being represented by Rochelle Chronister, the former state chairwoman. TRCS quickly began bleeding over into national politics, as their opposition to tax cuts came at a time where most Republican voices where calling for cutting taxes and Obamacare, which became a centerpiece of the campaign.

== Membership ==
- Dick Bond; former member of the state Senate.
- Rochelle Chronister; former member of the state House, former chairwoman of the Kansas Republican Party.
- Sheila Frahm; former U.S. Senator from Kansas.
- Fred Kerr; former member of the state Senate.
- Stephen Morris; president of the state Senate until 2012.
- Tim Owens; former member of the state House and Senate.
- Jim Yonally; chairman and former state House member.
- Wint Winter Jr.; former member of the State Senate.

== 2014 elections ==
One of the group's primary backers, Wint Winter Jr. proposed backing the Democrat Paul Davis during the 2014 election against Brownback. During the primaries Brownback suffered from a surprising challenge from Jennifer Winn, an outsider with a war-chest of just $13,596.17 whose son was facing a murder charge for a botched drug-deal, who campaigned almost solely on a marijuana legalization, and earned 37% of the vote. The group had supported a "serious challenge" in the hopes of avoiding nominating a Democrat. Davis, often described as a Conservative Democrat, focused his campaign on freezing the tax cuts and prioritization of education. Support from the Moderate Republicans would not be enough as Brownback narrowly won the election with 49.82% of the vote to Davis' 46.13%.

The group endorsed Greg Orman during the 2014 senate election. Orman sought to build a broad centrist coalition of moderate Republicans and Democrats to challenge Conservative Republican Pat Roberts. Orman, an independent, earned the TRCS endorsement due to his "problem-solving mentality" and the TRCS belief that he would work to end deadlock in Senate. The TRCS was particularly oppose to Roberts due to his anti-regulation, anti-spending vote against the Agricultural Act of 2014. the TRCS would campaign heavily for Orman, arguing that Roberts was to the "extreme right of conservative." The TRCS where also vehemently opposed to Kansas Secretary of State Kris Kobach who they viewed as an extremist due to his anti-migration policies. Roberts would win with 53.15% of the vote to Orman's 42.53%.

The group had also considered campaigning against Kevin Yoder in his congressional re-election in 2014 but ultimately chose not to as their resources where already stretched thin.

== Decline ==
Following the failure of the TRCS to either oust Brownback or Roberts its support gradually dwindled. As support shrank the TRCS and other moderate groups in the state started to turn on one another, claiming that other moderate Republicans weren't doing enough to support the cause. The group saw significant push-back from the state Republican party and as such alienated many grassroots Republicans who were upset with the group working with Democrats to support policies including more taxes and bigger government. The TRCS and its leadership was seen as an entrenched "deep state" in Kansas, mostly due to its members having been longtime politicians in opposition to Brownback's anti-establishment message. The TRCS would also see significant criticism due to its primary financial backer, Wint Winter Jr., being a vocal opponent of Ronald Reagan, having actively campaigned for John B. Anderson in 1980. Ultimately the idea of an umbrella moderate Republican group fell apart and the TRCS splintered into groups supporting individual candidates like "Republicans for Jill Docking, Republicans for Kathleen Sebelius, Republicans for Paul Morrison, Republicans for Dan Glickman, Republicans for Dennis Moore" etc.
