= Sam Brownback 2008 presidential campaign =

2008 Presidential campaign of Sam Brownback

Sam Brownback 2008
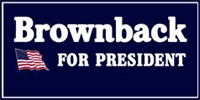
- Campaign: 2008 United States presidential election
- Candidate: Sam Brownback; U.S. Senator from Kansas (1996-2011)
- Affiliation: Republican Party
- Status: Dropped out on October 19, 2007
- Announced: December 4, 2006 (Exploratory committee); January 20, 2007

Website
- www.brownback.com (Archived on October 11, 2007)

The 2008 presidential campaign of Sam Brownback, a U.S. Senator from Kansas, began on December 4, 2006, with the formation of an exploratory committee. Several weeks later on January 20, 2007, Brownback officially announced his candidacy for the Republican Party nomination for President of the United States. Brownback had first been elected to the Senate in a special election in 1996, previously having been a member of the U.S. House of Representatives. He was popular among social conservatives and positioned himself as a compassionate conservative, often using his Catholic faith to justify some of his policy positions. From the start of his announcement, media outlets noted that his candidacy was a long-shot and highly unlikely to succeed, and throughout the campaign, Brownback struggled with both fundraising and rising above single-digits in opinion polls.

On October 19, 2007, after several months of campaigning Brownback announced the end of his campaign, with many speculating that he would instead focus on running for Governor of Kansas in 2010. In November 2007, Brownback endorsed fellow U.S. Senator John McCain, who later went on to win the Republican Party's nomination. Brownback was later elected to the Kansas governorship in 2010 and was re-elected in 2014 before being appointed as an ambassador-at-large by President Donald Trump in 2017.

== Background ==
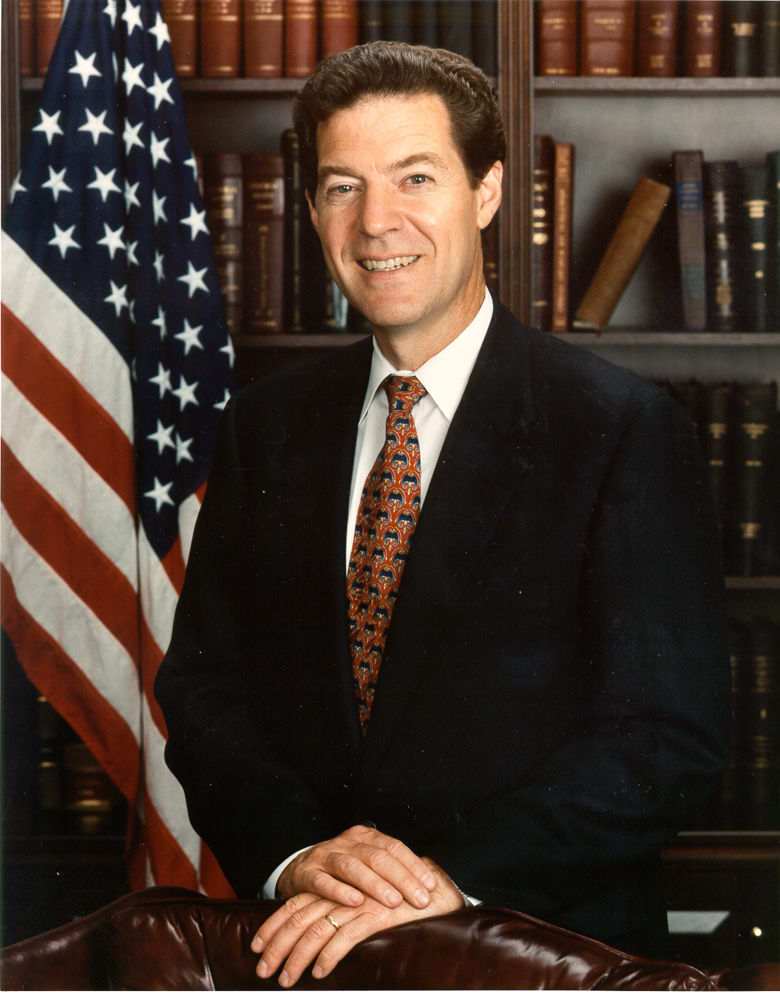
Official Senate photo of Sam Brownback, 2001

Sam Brownback grew up on a farm outside of Parker, Kansas and received a law degree from the University of Kansas in 1982, after which he served as an attorney at law in Manhattan, Kansas. From 1986 to 1993, he also served as the Kansas Secretary of Agriculture, during which time he spent one year as a White House Fellow. In 1994, he was elected to the United States House of Representatives as part of the Republican Revolution that gave the Republican Party (of which Brownback was a member) control of both the House of Representatives and the United States Senate. Brownback would later be elected to the Senate in 1996, filling the seat vacated by Bob Dole, who had resigned as part of his failed presidential campaign. He was reelected in both 1998 and 2004. Following his second reelection, he stated that he would only serve two terms and vowed not to run again in 2010.

In government, Brownback aligned himself with conservatives and the Christian right in particular (Brownback himself was a Catholic, converting from Methodism in 2002), opposing abortion, same-sex marriage, and research on embryonic stem cells. He has self-described himself as a "bleeding-heart conservative" and has discussed several of his positions as being in agreement with the consistent life ethic. In a 2006 article, The New York Times described him as an advocate for compassionate conservatism and called him "one of the Senate’s most frequent travelers to Africa" and an advocate for victims of HIV/AIDS. In an interview with Congressional Quarterly that same year, Brownback, regarding compassionate conservatism, said "I’m really mining the area, whether it’s prison reform, reconciliation — particularly with African Americans, poverty reduction."

== Exploratory committee ==
On December 4, 2006, Brownback announced the formation of an exploratory committee for a possible campaign for the Republican nomination in the 2008 United States presidential election. That day, on his website, Brownback stated "I am running to spread hope and ideas. We are a blessed nation at an important crossroads. War, corruption, disintegrating families, and for some, hopelessness, tear at the American dream. We need hope and ideas." Brownback announced the names of about 20 members of his exploratory committee, which included former Commissioner of Baseball Bowie Kuhn, Domino's Pizza founder Tom Monaghan, and the Reverend Frank Pavone, head of Priests for Life. It was also announced that Brownback's Chief of Staff Rob Wasinger would head the committee and that the offices would be based in the metropolitan area of Kansas City, Kansas. At the time of his announcement, CBS News stated that he had been considering a presidential run for the past 2 years, but lacked a national recognition that several other possible candidates held. Brownback hoped to elevate his recognition by visiting 10 states in the month after his announcement, starting with a trip to Cedar Rapids, Iowa on December 5.

The New York Times labeled him a dark horse candidate compared to possible Republican contenders such as Rudy Giuliani and John McCain, who were thought to represent the more moderate faction of the Republican Party. The newspaper claimed that Massachusetts Governor Mitt Romney would most likely be Brownback's biggest competitor in winning over the more conservative members of the party and stated that Brownback acknowledged he was a "long shot". This was a trend throughout Brownback's campaign, with several sources calling the campaign an "uphill battle" and a "long-shot".

In the weeks leading up to the exploratory committee, Brownback had caused some controversy after blocking a vote on Federal judge nominee Janet T. Neff, who had attended a same-sex wedding, arguing that her attendance raised questions regarding her impartiality on matters of same-sex marriage. On December 8, he said he would remove his block if Neff recused herself on any cases regarding same-sex marriage, which caused more controversy for Brownback. On December 18, Brownback stated he would allow a vote.

== Campaign developments ==
=== Announcement ===
On January 20, 2007, at a rally in Topeka, Kansas, Brownback officially announced his candidacy for the Republican presidential nomination in a speech referencing The Wizard of Oz, stating, "My family and I are taking the first steps on the yellow brick road to the White House." During the speech, Brownback touted his conservative positions on issues, claiming he was a "full-scale Ronald Reagan conservative". RealClearPolitics called Brownback the first major Republican to announce his candidacy. Shortly after the announcement, the Democratic National Committee released a statement calling him "a stubborn ideologue who places his own political agenda over the needs of the American people". On January 22, Brownback filed his statement of candidacy with the Federal Election Commission. That same day, Brownback returned to Washington, D.C. to participate in an anti-abortion rally coinciding with the 34th anniversary of the Roe v. Wade ruling.

=== Early campaign events (January - April) ===
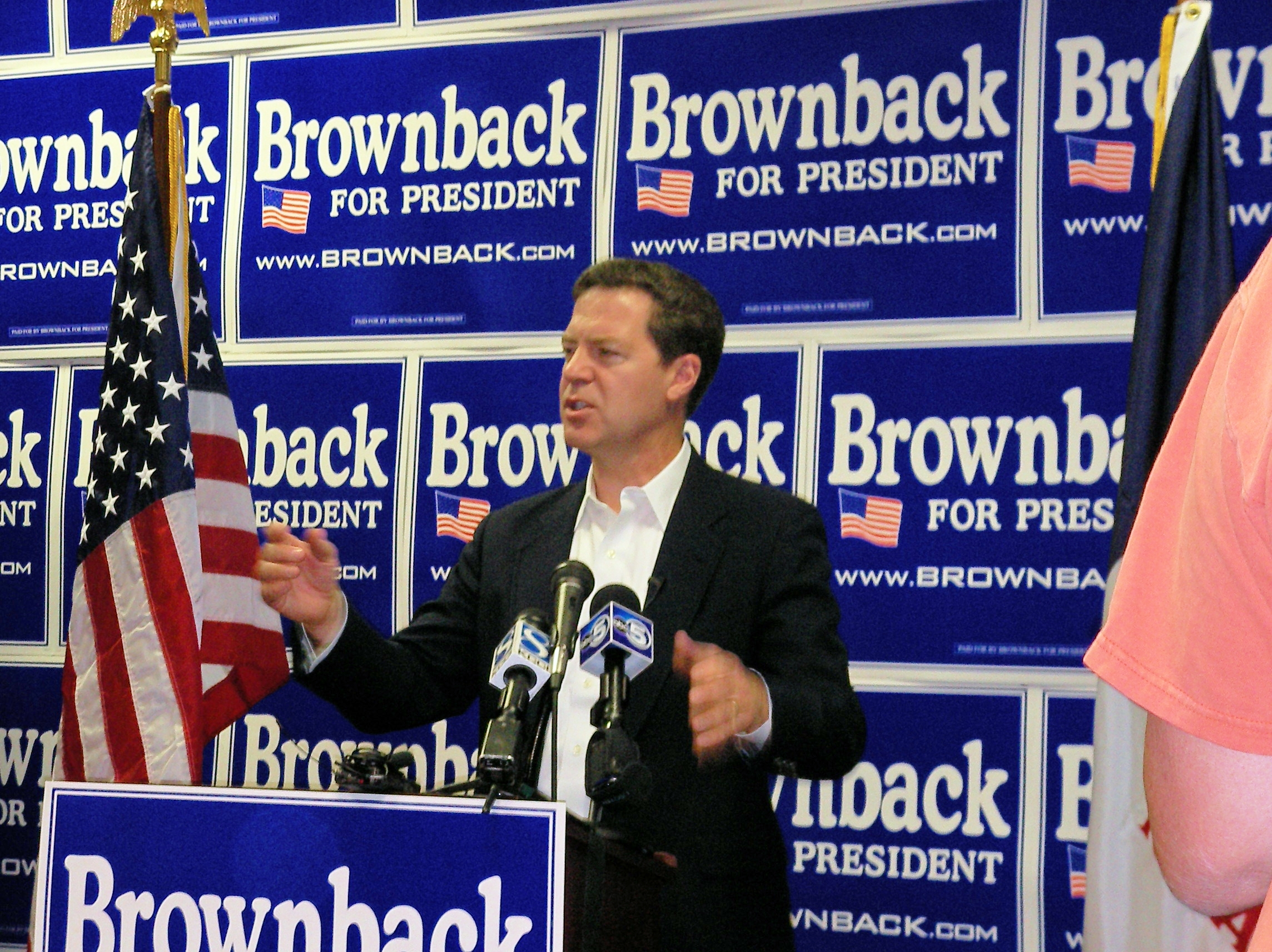
Brownback speaking in West Des Moines, Iowa in May 2007

At the start of his campaigning, Brownback focused extensively on the state of Iowa, with Romney being the only Republican candidate to visit the state more than Brownback between 2004 and January 2007. Many of his campaign stops in the state focused on socially conservative groups, winning him early endorsement from board members of groups such as Iowa Right to Life, Iowa Christian Alliance, and the Iowa Family Policy Center. In late January, Brownback spoke before about 350 Republican Party members at a luncheon in Columbia, South Carolina. Members of the Christian right were an important voting bloc in the state's Republican Party and Brownback was trying to win them over from both Romney, who he accused of having a questionable record on abortion, and former Arkansas Governor Mike Huckabee, an ordained Southern Baptist preacher who had recently entered the race for the Republican nomination and had a large support from evangelical Christian Republicans. Around the same time, Brownback added gospel singer Michael W. Smith as a national co-chairman of his campaign. In late February, Brownback, along with McCain, Romney, and U.S. Representative Duncan L. Hunter traveled to the National Convention of Religious Broadcasters in Orlando, Florida in order to appeal to evangelical voters, during which time NPR reported that there was no obvious front-runner within that voting bloc. On March 3–4, many Republican candidates, Brownback included, attended the Conservative Political Action Conference. By this time, there was still no clear front-runner among the more right-wing portion of the party, and in the conference's straw poll, Brownback placed third with 15 percent of the vote, behind Romney (21 percent) and Giuliani (17 percent) and ahead of former Speaker of the U.S. House of Representatives Newt Gingrich (14 percent) and McCain (12 percent). Brownback also attended the Iowa Prayer Breakfast in Des Moines on April 6. By the end of the first fiscal quarter of 2007, Brownback's campaign had raised $1.27 million, compared to the three leading Republican candidates (Giuliani, McCain, and Romney) who had all raised in excess of $12 million.

=== Initial debates and controversies (May - August) ===
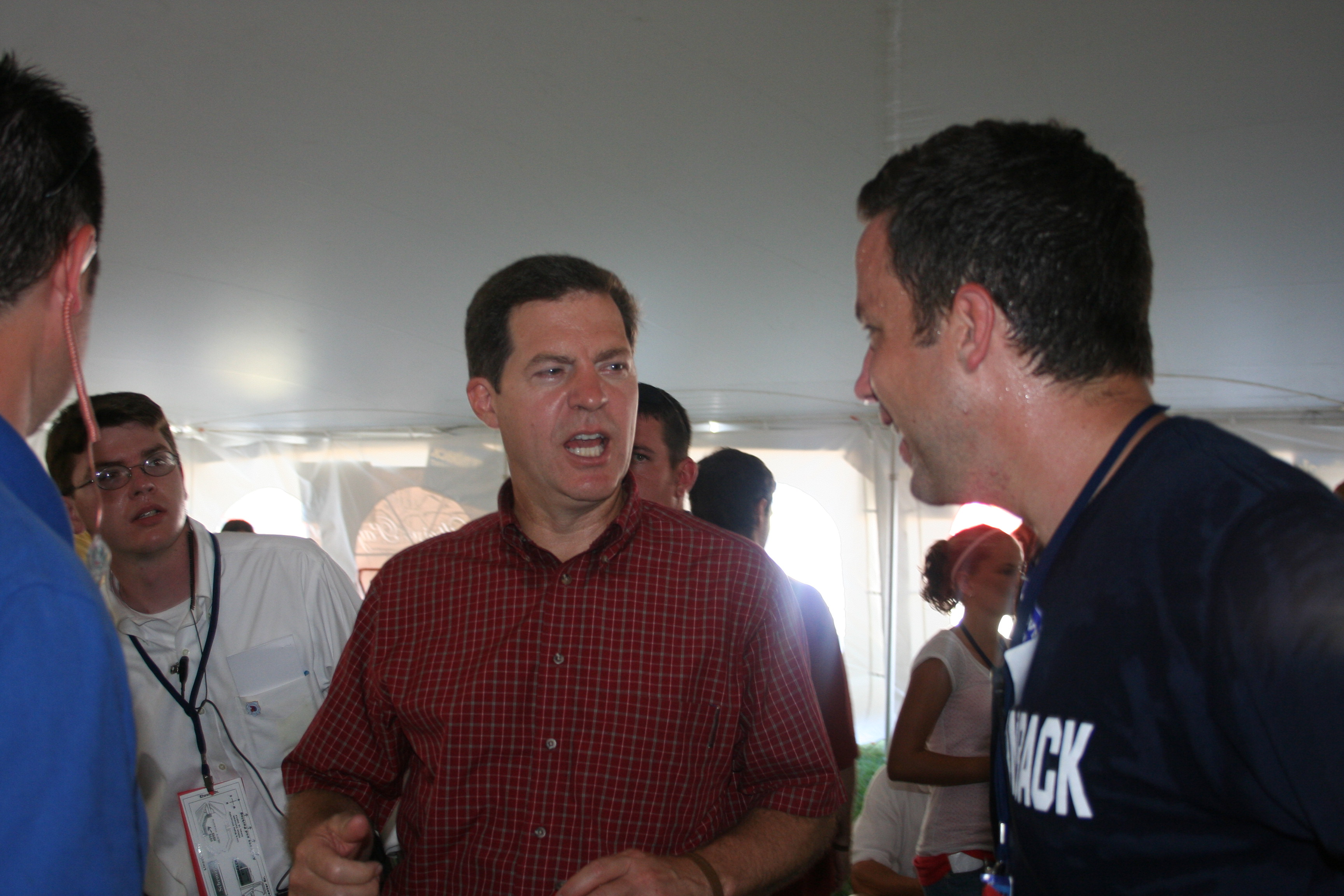
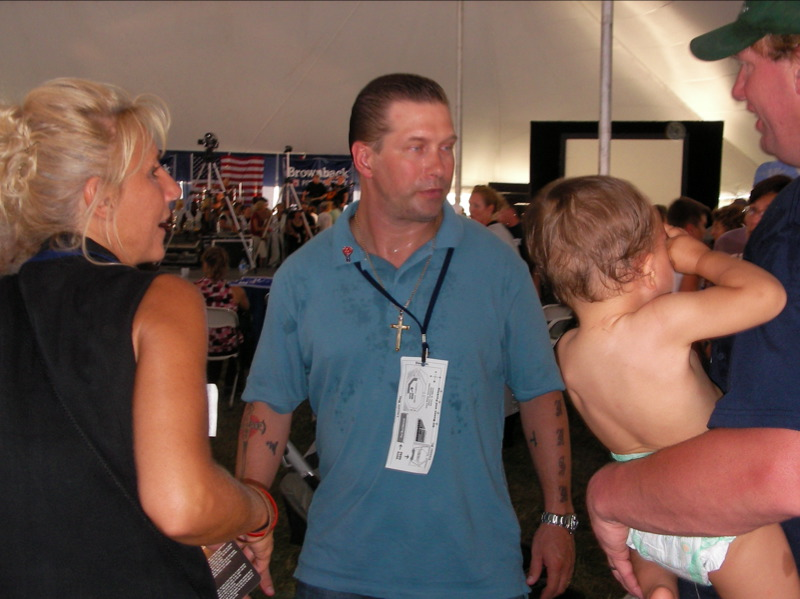
Brownback campaigning in Ames, Iowa during the Iowa Straw Poll. He was joined by actor Stephen Baldwin (right), who supported Brownback's campaign.

On May 3, Brownback was one of ten candidates who participated in the first Republican Party presidential debate at the Ronald Reagan Presidential Library in Simi Valley, California. In an article written after the debate for Politico, political consultant Mike Murphy claimed that Brownback was one of the stronger "second-tier" candidates in the debate, saying, "Among the other candidates, Sam Brownback had a particularly strong night. He talked with passion and elegance about the social issues that are the backbone of his candidacy." Of note, Brownback drew media attention for being one of three candidates at the debate (along with Huckabee and U.S. Representative Tom Tancredo of Colorado) who claimed they did not believe in evolution. The incident drew national media coverage, and on May 31, Brownback wrote an op-ed in The New York Times further explaining his stance. Brownback participated in the second Republican presidential debate in Columbia, South Carolina on May 15 and the third debate at Saint Anselm College in New Hampshire on June 5. On June 8, Brownback, Huckabee, and Tancredo stated they would compete in the Iowa Straw Poll and challenged Romney (the only top-tier candidate competing in the poll after Giuliani and McCain both declined) to a series of debates. On August 11, Brownback campaigned in Ames, Iowa, where the straw poll was being conducted. Actor Stephen Baldwin made a guest appearance at the event in support of Brownback. However, Brownback ended up finishing third in the poll behind Romney and Huckabee.

On June 18, an aide for the Brownback campaign was reprimanded for sending an email to several leaders of the Iowa Republican Party where he criticized the Church of Jesus Christ of Latter-day Saints (LDS Church) and contended that the church did not share much in common with other Christian denominations. The email was apparently intended to draw support away from Romney (who was a member of the LDS Church), and Brownback later issued an apology to Romney, which he accepted. In late July, Brownback and Huckabee got into what the online magazine Slate referred to as a "multiround spat" after a supporter of Huckabee in Iowa sent an email to several Evangelicals in Iowa urging them to consider supporting Huckabee over Brownback, using what the Brownback campaign considered anti-Catholic sentiments. A representative for Brownback's campaign referred to the use of "slurs" in the email and accused Huckabee's campaign of promoting a whisper campaign against Brownback. The person who sent the email apologized shortly thereafter, though he claimed that his statements were misconstrued as anti-Catholic, which was not his intent. Huckabee, meanwhile, stated he was glad to hear the apology and stressed that the email was sent by someone not affiliated with his campaign. However, the Brownback campaign criticized Huckabee for not taking a firm stance in denouncing the email, and through early August, both sides made statements critical of the other campaign, with a spokesperson for the Huckabee campaign stating that Brownback's team should "stop whining" about the email.

On August 5, during a presidential debate held in Iowa, Romney criticized Brownback for his campaign's use of robocalls that attacked Romney's past stance on abortion, claiming, "I get tired of people that are holier than thou because they've been pro-life longer than I have." Ultimately, the topic of abortion was one of the primary issues at this debate, with Brownback claiming that abortion represents "a core issue for our party". Romney continued to be a major target for the Brownback campaign, with the Brownback campaign calling Romney's change in stance on abortion a "Mitt-amorphosis", and an August 22 opinion piece by journalist Jose Antonio Vargas in The Washington Post highlighted that part of Brownback's campaign blog was dedicated to covering the "Mitt Flop File".

=== Further campaigning and withdrawal (September - October) ===
On September 4, Brownback attended a forum at the University of New Hampshire's Memorial Union Building in Durham, New Hampshire that was organized by the university's College Republicans group. The following night, he participated in another debate held on the university's campus, during which he stressed his opposition to same-sex marriage. According to writer Andy Towle, the debate audience booed Brownback's response that he supports a Constitutional amendment to ban same-sex marriage. However, political analyst Ross Douthat, writing for The Atlantic, applauded Brownback's response to a question regarding the future of Iraq wherein he supported a partition of Iraq, naming him the winner of that night's debate. In an opinion poll of registered Republicans conducted by CNN and the Opinion Research Corporation between September 7 and 9, Brownback was not included in the final results, with the lowest polling candidate included being Tancredo at 1 percent.

Brownback participated in another debate on September 17 in Fort Lauderdale, Florida that focused on "family values". During a September 27 debate at Morgan State University (a historically black university) in Maryland, Brownback commented on several absent Republican candidates who did not attend the debate, telling the audience, "I'm sorry. A lot of people on the Republican side say we can’t get votes from the African American community. Why don’t you pick one of the primary states, register voters… and then vote for one of the six of us." On October 9, Brownback attended the debate in Dearborn, Michigan, and argued in favor of a "flat" federal income tax.

Despite his campaigning and debate participation, by October, Brownback was polling near the bottom of the list of Republican candidates. On October 11, the Associated Press reported that Brownback was polling at 2 percent in the most recent poll by The Des Moines Register, putting him in eighth place. The only candidates to poll lower were Hunter and perennial candidate Alan Keyes, while front-runner Romney was polling at 29 percent. CBS News further reported that Brownback was trailing several candidates by millions of dollars in fundraising and that his campaigning in Iowa at this point had "stalled", despite campaign stops in Dubuque and Muscatine, Iowa. Between July and September, Brownback ranked seventh among Republican candidates in funding, raising a total of approximately $4 million overall. Additionally, the Associated Press-Ipsos poll for October gave Brownback a 1 percent approval nationwide, down from a peak of 3 percent in June. Despite this, in early October, Brownback stated his intention to stay in the race until January, vowing to drop out if he placed worse than 4th place in the Iowa caucuses. However, on October 18, CBS News reported that Brownback was expected to end his campaign the following day, with the primary issue being a lack of funds. At the time, the campaign had approximately $94,000 on hand, far below other Republican candidates. Additionally, Brownback expressed a desire to return to Kansas and many anticipated that he was planning to run for Governor of Kansas in 2010, after his second full Senate term expired.

On October 19, speaking from the Kansas State Capitol in Topeka, Brownback announced he was ending his campaign, stating, "Today I’m ending my candidacy. My yellow brick road just came short of the White House this time." Earlier that day, Brownback spoke at a Family Research Council summit in Washington, D.C. in what CBS News called his campaign's curtain call.

== Endorsements ==
The following people endorsed Brownback during his campaign:

- Stephen Baldwin, actor
- Angela Perez Baraquio, Miss America 2001
- Pat Boone, singer
- Jay Feaster, general manager of the Tampa Bay Lightning
- David Kim, CEO of Baja Fresh

== Aftermath ==
While Brownback did not immediately endorse another candidate, on October 25, he met with Giuliani in what the Associated Press said could be concerning an endorsement from Brownback. The Associated Press also named McCain and Huckabee as possible candidates he could endorse who shared similar positions as Brownback. Following their meeting, Brownback stated he was "much more comfortable" with Giuliani's stance on abortion, and the National Right to Life Committee defended the talks after a lawyer they had on retainer criticized them. Ultimately, Brownback chose not to endorse Giuliani and instead announced his endorsement of McCain on November 7. Prior to the announcement, Brownback had expressed to Newsweek his bewilderment at how sought after his endorsement had been following his withdrawal, saying "They seem to put a lot of weight on what I'm going to do. I don't know if it's that they see [my endorsement] as worth a lot—or that it would be costly to them if someone else gets it." Giuliani and McCain's seeking of Brownback's endorsement was largely seen as both more moderate candidates trying to appeal to more conservative voters, and around the same time Brownback gave his endorsement of McCain, Giuliani received the endorsement of noted Christian conservative Pat Robertson.

Brownback was later elected to the Kansas governorship in 2010 during the red wave of 2010 with support from members of the Tea Party movement. As governor, Brownback oversaw the Kansas experiment, a series of large tax cuts that were generally recognized as hurting the state and regarded by many fellow Republicans as a failure. While many of the tax cuts and policies were later repealed by the Kansas Legislature, Brownback was reelected in 2014 with less than 50 percent of the vote. In 2017, U.S. President Donald Trump nominated him for the position of United States Ambassador-at-Large for International Religious Freedom, and he was confirmed to that position in February 2018.
