= Kansas experiment =

2012 tax cut in the US state of Kansas

The Kansas experiment was a controversial and widely noted tax-cutting policy/agenda of Kansas Governor Sam Brownback that began with Brownback signing a bill cutting state taxes (Kansas Senate Bill Substitute HB 2117), in May 2012, and ended with the Kansas legislature's repeal of the bill in June 2017. It was one of the largest income tax cuts in the state's history. The Kansas experiment has also been called the "Great Kansas Tax Cut Experiment", the "Red-state experiment", "the tax experiment in Kansas", and "one of the cleanest experiments for how tax cuts affect economic growth in the U.S." The cuts were based on model legislation published by the conservative American Legislative Exchange Council (ALEC), supported by supply-side economist Arthur Laffer, anti-tax leader Grover Norquist, and the influential industrialists Charles and David Koch. The law cut taxes by US$231 million in its first year, and cuts were projected to total US$934 million annually after six years, by eliminating taxes on business income for the owners of almost 200,000 businesses and cutting individual income tax rates.

Brownback compared his tax policies with those of Ronald Reagan, and described them as "a real live experiment", which would be a "shot of adrenaline into the heart of the Kansas economy", and predicted that by 2020 they would have created an additional 23,000 jobs. However, economic growth was consistently below average during the experiment, and by 2017, state revenues had fallen by hundreds of millions of dollars, causing spending on roads, bridges, and education to be slashed. On June 5, 2017, the Legislature of Kansas passed a bipartisan measure to raise income taxes and roll back the cuts; although Brownback vetoed the repeal, the legislature narrowly succeeded in getting the two-thirds vote necessary to override his veto.

Several reasons have been given to explain its failure. Economic growth under the new lower tax rates generated only enough new revenue to offset 10–30% of most of the initial tax cut, necessitating spending cuts to avoid deficits. Kansas's elimination of pass-through income (projected to apply to 200,000 taxpayers, but used by 330,000) created a loophole which allowed many taxpayers to restructure their employment to completely avoid income taxes, thereby additionally decreasing revenue. According to tax policy theory, tax cuts generate only modest economic growth, which comes only in the long term, not in the short term.

== History ==
=== Background ===
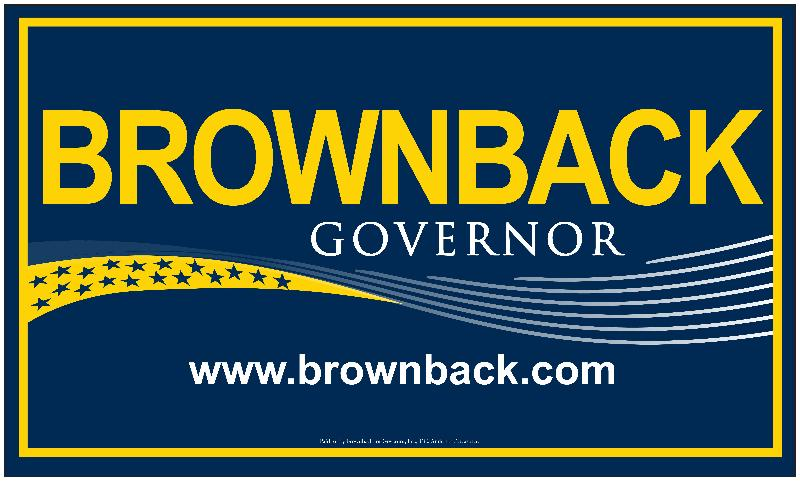
Sam Brownback's 2009 campaign poster for the 2010 Kansas gubernatorial election

As a conservative Republican Senator from Kansas, Brownback had been reelected by large margins in 1998 and 2004, and had also run briefly for president in 2008, withdrawing before the primaries began. In 2010 he ran for governor, defeating his Democratic opponent Tom Holland 63.3% to 32.2%. Also winning a sweeping victory in 2010 in Kansas was the Tea Party movement of the Republican party, whose members largely shared Brownback's views and who made up most of the Republican majority in the 2010 Kansas House of Representatives—the largest majority in half a century.

When Brownback took office in January 2011, the US was still recovering from the Great Recession. In addition, there was a feeling in the state that economic growth in Kansas had been lagging behind other states in the region "for years," according to Kenneth Kriz, professor of public finance at Wichita State University. Conservatives believed a large tax cut would "boost investment, raise employment, and jump-start the economy", a theory sometimes described as supply-side economics or trickle-down economics.

Reducing taxes was one of Brownback's two major stated goals as governor (the other being to increase education spending). Some Kansans interviewed by a journalist and Burdett Loomis, a political scientist at the University of Kansas, speculated that Brownback hoped that, after his failed first attempt in 2008, the success of the tax cuts would help launch another campaign for the presidency.

=== Legislation ===
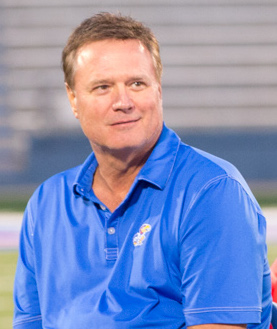
University of Kansas men's basketball coach Bill Self, who remains one of the highest paid state employees in Kansas, infamously benefitted from the Brownback tax cuts, which resulted in Self paying little-to-no income taxes through Brownback's elimination of taxes on LLCs and "pass-through" businesses.

Kansas Senate Bill Substitute HB 2117, "one of the largest income tax cuts in Kansas history", was introduced in January 2011, approved by Brownback in May 2012, and became effective on July 1 of the same year. A key part of the bill was the elimination of taxes on "pass-through" income. This was income that businesses — such as sole proprietorships, partnerships, limited liability companies, and subchapter S corporations — pass on to their owners instead of paying corporate income tax on. Before HB 2117 in Kansas, these owners paid a 7% individual income tax on their income.

The bill cut the state's individual income tax rates and cut the number of individual income tax brackets from three to two. Specifically, the top income tax rates were cut from 6.45% and 6.25% to 4.9%, allowing higher earning taxpayers to pay the same marginal rate as the middle class; the bottom rate was reduced from 3.5% to 3%. Brownback planned to bring those rates down even more in future years. The original bill proposed by Brownback included a provision to offset the losses expected to result from the cuts by increasing the state sales tax and eliminating numerous tax credits and deductions. The legislature removed these offsets in the final bill.

=== Initial reception ===
As the bill was signed, supporters predicted an economic revival in Kansas, while opponents predicted an unparalleled budget crisis. Brownback stated the plan would deliver a "shot of adrenaline" to the Kansas economy. His administration projected the creation of 23,000 jobs a year in Kansas in addition to those created by natural economic growth.

After signing the bill, Brownback argued that the cuts would pay for themselves through the increased revenue resulting from boosting the state's economic growth. Supporters pointed to projections from the conservative Kansas Policy Institute predicting that the bill would lead to a US$323 million increase in tax revenue. Less supportive was a forecast from the Legislature's research staff indicating that a budget shortfall would emerge by 2014 and grow to nearly US$2.5 billion by July 2018. In June 2012, Brownback stated on the MSNBC show Morning Joe, "On taxes, you need to get your overall rates down, and you need to get your social manipulation out of it, in my estimation, to create growth. We'll see how it works. We'll have a real live experiment." He also called it a "red-state experiment".

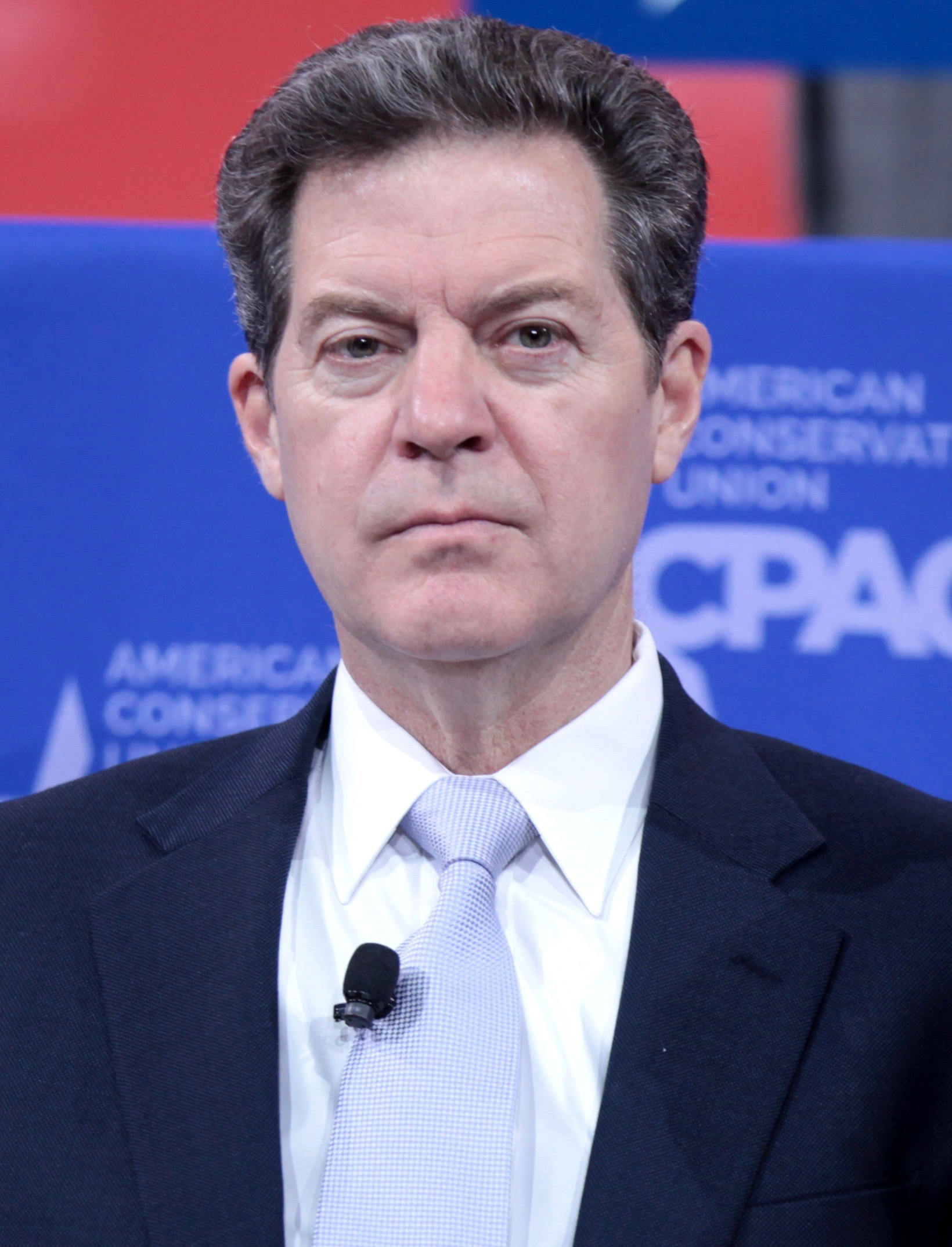
Brownback at CPAC in 2015

In the spring of 2014, monthly revenue for state government "crashed", and fell "massively short of projections". The Washington Post and Michael Hiltzik, a reporter for the Los Angeles Times, warned that job creation and economic growth in Kansas were lagging those of its neighboring states. (Note: Some slightly later statistics were not encouraging. In 2015, "10,900 total nonfarm jobs" were added to the Kansas economy, for a job growth rate of 0.8 percent, among the lowest rates in the country that year. From January 2013 to 2015, private sector jobs in Kansas grew by 3.5%, less than half of the national rate of 7.6%.) Nonetheless, many conservative sources were enthusiastic. The Wall Street Journal published an op-ed by Brownback where he called his experiment "A Midwest Renaissance Rooted in the Reagan Formula", compared his tax cut policies with those of Ronald Reagan, and announced a "prosperous future" for Republican-dominated Kansas, Oklahoma, and Missouri.

Brownback's tax consultant Arthur Laffer, a supply-side economist who predicted the cuts would support job growth, calling Brownback's policies "amazing ... Truly revolutionary." Influential anti-tax activist Grover Norquist defended Brownback's tax cuts as "the right thing for the economy", and claimed that Kansas was in better economic shape than the tax-cut critics alleged, and that the state had "provided a model, a successful model, that will phase out the income tax."

=== Results ===
By early 2017, Kansas had "nine rounds of budget cuts over four years, three credit downgrades, missed state payments", and what The Atlantic called "an ongoing atmosphere of fiscal crisis". To make up the budget shortfall, lawmakers tapped into state reserves set aside for future spending, postponed construction projects and pension contributions, and cut Medicaid benefits. Since approximately half of the state's budget went to school funding, education was particularly hard hit. In addition to budget problems, Kansas was lagging behind neighboring states with similar economies in "nearly every major category: job creation, unemployment, gross domestic product, taxes collected".

==== Budget and revenue ====
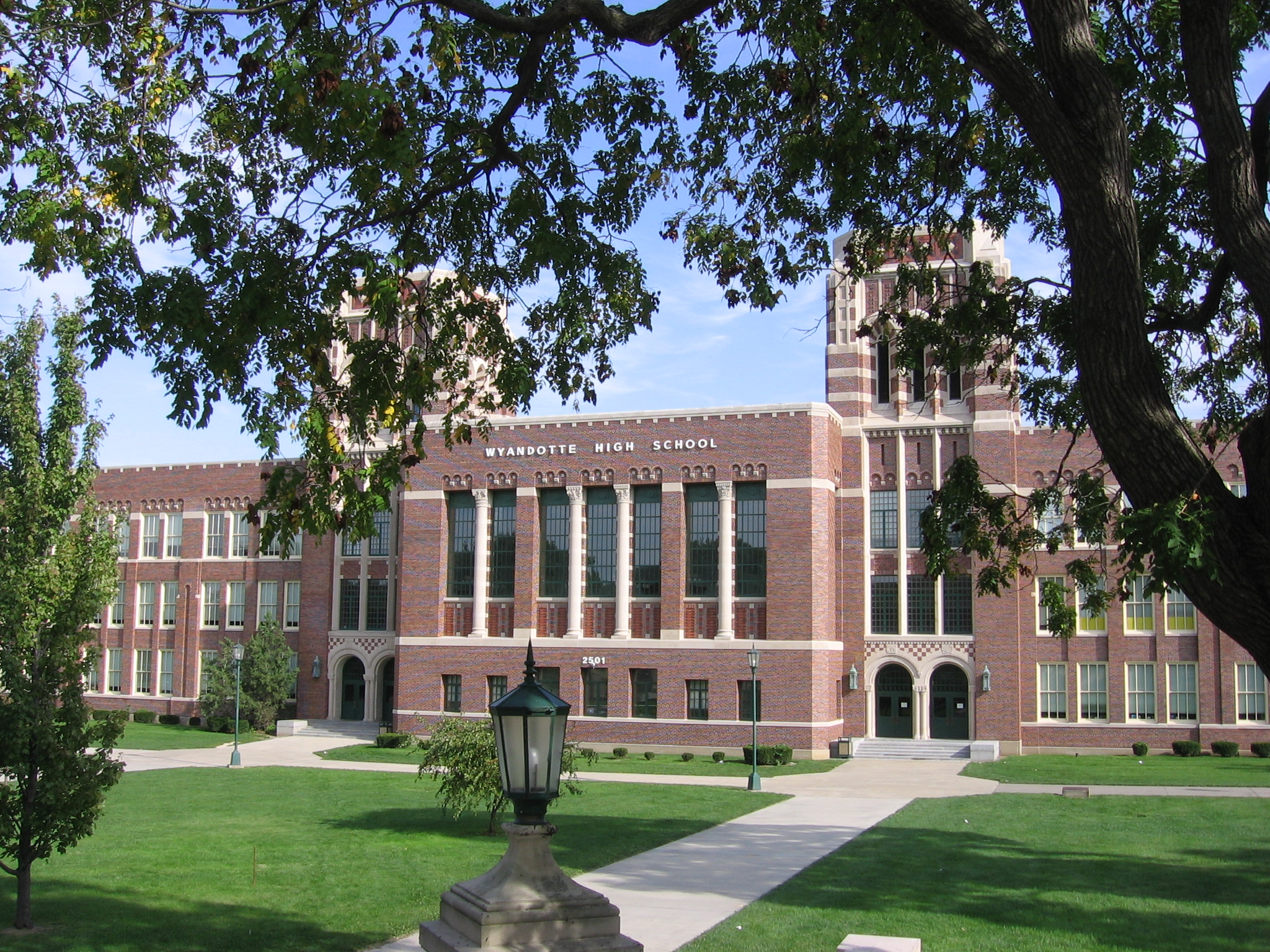
The Kansas experiment was detrimental to state tax revenues and funding, especially to the Kansas Department of Education, which saw drastic budget cuts. Wyandotte High School in Wyandotte County, Kansas (pictured) was among the public schools hit hardest by Brownback's tax cuts.

By 2017, National Public Radio reported state lawmakers were seeking to close a $900 million budget gap, (Note: Other reports were that Kansas had a $350 million budget shortfall in February 2017. or had the state’s "budget deficit was expected to hit $280 million" in 2017". For the previous fiscal year (2016), the state's tax revenue was $420 million below the amount raised the year the tax cuts first took effect.) following nine previous budget cuts. Earlier efforts to close budget gaps had left Kansas "well below national averages" in a wide range of public services from K-12 education to housing to police and fire protection. In education, school districts dealt with cuts by shutting down the school year early, eliminating school programs, cutting maintenance, phasing out teaching positions, enlarging class sizes, increasing fees for kindergarten, and cutting janitorial personnel and librarians. School districts were consolidated and some schools were closed.

By early 2017, The Wichita Eagle reported that the governor proposed taking nearly $600 million from the highway fund over the next two and a half years to balance the state general budget, after having used US$1.3 billion from the fund since 2011 for the same purpose. This first transfer of funds had already caused the Kansas Department of Transportation to "indefinitely delay" two dozen road expansion projects in April 2016. According to Kansas State Senator Carolyn McGinn, "we've had pretty good roads, but now we're starting to see the deterioration." Millions were also borrowed from the state pension fund. Kansas became the only state without a state-funded arts commission, and closed nine social service offices around the state.

The tax cuts contributed to credit rating downgrades, which raised borrowing costs and led to more budget cuts in education and infrastructure. Moody's downgraded the state's bond rating in 2014. S&P downgraded its credit rating first from AA+ to AA in August 2014, due to a budget that analysts described as structurally unbalanced, and again in February 2017 from AA to AA−.

==== Jobs and growth ====
By 2018, overall growth and job creation in Kansas had underperformed the national economy, neighboring states, and "even Kansas' own growth in previous years." (Note: From March 2015 to March 2016, Kansas gained 800 private-sector jobs, an increase of 0.1 percent.) Kansas' job growth lagged neighboring Missouri, Colorado, and Nebraska. In January 2014, following the passage of both tax cuts, the Nebraska labor force grew by a net 35,000 non-farm jobs through April 2017, compared to only 28,000 in Kansas, which has a larger labor force. (Note: Instead of the 100,000 new jobs Brownback had promised would be created in the four years of his second term, as of January 2016 (slightly more than a year into this term), 700 were added during this term.)

==== Election and popularity fallout ====
In 2014, Brownback ran for reelection, challenged by Paul Davis, the Democratic minority leader of the Kansas House of Representatives. Davis was endorsed by over 100 former and current Kansas Republican officials who criticized Brownback's leadership. Brownback managed to defeat Davis by 3.69 percent, a decline from the more than 30% margin he had gained in his first governor's race victory, thanks at least in part to effective campaign ads attacking Davis for his brief detention during a 1998 police raid of a strip club.

Brownback's popularity continued to suffer in Kansas after his re-election as governor. Three separate polls between November 2015 and September 2016 ranked Brownback as the nation's least-popular governor, the September 2016 poll showing an approval rating of 23%. Two years later, "a wave of moderate Republicans" opposed to the tax cuts replaced many of the conservative supporters of the experiment in the state legislature. The election was considered largely a referendum on Brownback's policies and administration.

=== Repeal ===
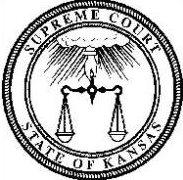
In 2017, the Kansas Supreme Court unanimously ruled that Brownback's deliberate underfunding of public schools caused by tax cuts and revenue drops was unconstitutional.

By 2017, after a protracted battle, the new Kansas Legislature voted to repeal Brownback's tax cuts and enact tax increases, overriding Brownback's veto of them. By April 2017, 66% of Kansans told pollsters they disapproved of Brownback's job performance, with 27% still approving. After "years of dealing with budget" shortfalls by borrowing, "quick fixes" and consumption tax hikes on tobacco, fuel, and other consumer goods, the Kansas legislature was left with "few remaining options" other than steep and broad tax hikes or more spending cuts. Brownback's 2012 tax cuts were described as threatening "the viability of schools and infrastructure" in Kansas. The Kansas Supreme Court had ordered the state legislature "to increase funding for public schools by US$293 million over the next two years".

A repeal of the tax cut was attempted in February 2017 by a coalition of Democrats and newly elected centrist Republicans, who passed legislation (Senate Bill number 30 or SB 30) to raise income-tax rates and eliminate an exemption for small businesses. SB 30 repealed most of the tax cuts implemented by HB 2117. It called for:

- Raising individual income taxes.
- Repealing the pass-through income exemption.
- Reenacting the itemized deductions for mortgage interest, property taxes paid, and medical expenses.
- Reenacting a child care tax credit.
- Reducing the low-income exclusion level.

The Senate passed bill SB 30 (38–0 with 2 not voting) on February 2, 2017. Three weeks later, the House passed SB 30, as amended (123–2). Shortly after Brownback vetoed this first attempt, the legislature attempted to override his veto but came up three votes short in the Kansas Senate. Several months later on June 5, 2017, the Conference Committee Report was adopted by both the Kansas House (69–52) and Senate (26–14). On June 6, 2017, the bill was sent to Brownback, who once again vetoed the bill. The same day, two-thirds majorities in both the House and Senate overrode his veto, and SB 30 became law. The measure was estimated to boost state taxes by $1.2 billion over two years, in part by raising the top income tax rate from 4.6% to 5.7%, and by restoring the pass-through business tax.

=== Aftermath ===
Brownback did not serve out his full second term as governor. Shortly after the repeal, he resigned and was appointed U.S. Ambassador-at-Large for International Religious Freedom. He was confirmed in January 2018. In the 2018 Kansas gubernatorial election, the Republican candidate, conservative Kris Kobach, promised to "try to roll back the tax hikes" of the 2017 legislative session, and urged a return to "a more low-tax structure like we had from 2013 to 2016" during the Brownback administration. He told voters that "Kansas doesn't have a revenue problem. Kansas has a spending problem." Kobach was defeated by Democrat Laura Kelly, who became governor.

== Impact ==
=== Lessons ===
Despite its record and the fact that "many experts regard the Kansas tax cuts as a failure", the 2017 Republican tax cuts (Tax Cuts and Jobs Act of 2017) had some of the same elements of Brownback's policy, and "many Republicans still embrace the ideology" behind the Kansas tax cuts. Several commentators compared the Kansas experiment to the 2017 federal tax cuts, which were debated during and after the repeal of the Kansas cuts. The Kansas tax cuts were described as a "warning sign", "the kind of fiscal policy the Trump administration wants to enact nationally", a policy that the Trump tax cuts "echo", a "template" for tax cuts that "crashed and burned", and as a policy whose repeal "lays bare the ... risks for Republicans in Washington pursuing a similar policy at the national level."

Kansas Republicans commented on the relationship between the two cuts. State Representative Stephanie Clayton asserted that "the real example" the Kansas experiment provides to the rest of the country is that "the voters will get angry with you, and it doesn't matter how solid-red your state is." State Senator Jim Denning warned: "It was supposed to increase the GDP, and it didn't. The feds will have that same problem." This was a sentiment repeated by William G. Gale of the Brookings Institution, who stated that one of the most important implications of the Kansas experiment for federal tax reform is "not to expect tax cuts to boost the economy much, if at all".

=== Direct benefits for the affluent ===
The act received criticism for shifting the tax burden from wealthy Kansans to low- and moderate-income workers. According to the Center on Budget and Policy Priorities, the bill cut the taxes of "the wealthiest 1% of Kansans by 2.2%", while it projected that the poorest 20% of Kansans would see "their taxes increase by 1.3%". Bryan Lowry of The Wichita Eagle estimated that almost 70% of Kansas lawmakers, as well as Governor Brownback and his wife, benefited personally from the tax cuts through business or property that they owned, which being non-wage income, was exempt from taxes under the 2012 law.

== Explanations and defense ==
=== Explanations offered for problems ===
According to critical observers, part of the reason for the large revenue loss was that the new 0% tax rate on pass-through business income was "exploited" and had "become a loophole" for taxpayers. Instead of 200,000 small businesses taking advantage of it, about 330,000 entities used the rule; among them were large limited liability law firms and oil exploration companies. These companies included a large number of subsidiaries of the Wichita-based Koch Industries, a very large firm whose owners, the Koch brothers, strongly supported the tax cuts and contributed to the political campaigns of Brownback and other tax cut supporters. Another source of exploitation is thought to be "tens of thousands" of workers who previously paid individual income tax but re-titled themselves as "independent contractors", claiming their remuneration was actually business income and now tax-free.

According to Max Ehrenfreund and economists he consulted, an explanation for the reduction instead of an increase in economic growth from the tax cuts is that any benefits from tax cuts come over the long, not short run, but what does come in the short run is a major decline in demand for goods and services. In the Kansas economy, cuts in state government expenditures cut the incomes of state government "employees, suppliers, and contractors" who spent much or most of their incomes locally. In addition, concern over the state's large budget deficits "might have deterred businesses from making major new investments".

An economic study published in 2018 found that the Kansas experiment did not stimulate economic growth and, if anything, harmed Kansas' economic performance. Applying multiple tests, including the synthetic control method within a difference in differences framework, the study found that the reduction in state and local government expenditures resulted in negative economic multiplier effects and increased economic uncertainty. Comparing Kansas to other, similar states, the study authors estimate that the Kansas economy grew about 7.82% less (real gross state product), and employment grew about 2.55% less than it would have had Brownback not cut taxes.

=== Defense ===
The experiment has been described as a "failure", or having "failed", by many observers. Governor Brownback rejected criticism of his cuts or needs to adjust the law, declaring the cuts a success, and blaming perceptions to the contrary on a "rural recession" and on "the left media", which he said "lies about the tax cuts all the time". Other explanations for the repeal were provided by conservative media and organizations. A Wall Street Journal opinion piece called the repeal the work in part of "unions getting even with the Governor over his education reforms, which included making it easier to fire bad teachers". It also defended the tax cuts by citing a low unemployment rate, which was 3.7% as of June 2017, and "considerable small-business formation" in Kansas. It called the complete elimination of "pass-through" taxes a mistake that resulted in less revenue than projected because it created a loophole allowing consultants, law practices, and accounting firms to avoid taxes.

Reason, an American libertarian magazine, blamed problems with the experiment on the failure to cut government spending up front, and the failure to eliminate "politically popular" tax exemptions and deductions. For the Cato Institute, Daniel J. Mitchell wrote on how the experiment revealed that "many Republicans" are actually "pro-tax big spenders" but said a "long-run" victory for the experiment since the post-repeal tax rates will still be "significantly lower" than before the Brownback experiment. It agreed that Republicans should not claim that "tax cuts pay for themselves". The Center on Budget and Policy Priorities dismissed conservative explanations for what Michael Mazerov described as the "failure of 'supply-side' tax cuts, writing: "Former supporters have offered explanations for this failure to prevent the Kansas experience from discrediting 'supply-side' economic strategies more broadly. But the evidence does not support these explanations. Rather, the Kansas experience adds to the already compelling evidence that cutting taxes does not improve state economic performance."

== See also ==
- Laffer curve
- Neoliberalism
- Reaganomics
- September 2022 United Kingdom mini-budget
