= Anthony Brown (Kansas politician) =

American politician

Member of the Kansas House of Representatives from the 38th district
- In office January 10, 2005 – January 14, 2013
- Preceded by: Rob Boyer
- Succeeded by: Willie Dove

Personal details
- Born: December 3, 1968 (age 57) Ottawa, Kansas, U.S.
- Party: Republican
- Spouse: Susan M. Brown
- Education: Emporia State University

Anthony R. Brown (December 3, 1968) is a former Republican member of the Kansas House of Representatives, representing the 38th district from 2005 until 2013. Brown, who has a BSE in Secondary Social Sciences from Emporia State University, has worked as a carpenter and school teacher. He is a member of the Knights of Columbus and Holy Family Catholic Church. In 2012, he ran for the 3rd district of the Kansas Senate, but lost to incumbent Democrat Tom Holland.

== Issue positions ==
Brown's website lists immigration, education, eminent domain, pro-life, environmental, and child support as his main legislative focuses.

== Committee membership ==
- Financial Institutions (Chair)
- Taxation
- Federal and State Affairs
- Insurance

== Sponsored legislation ==
- H 2150 – Property taxation; 2% limit on valuation increases. February 27, 2009
- H 2202 – Enforcement of laws concerning unlawful immigration. February 3, 2009
- H 2205 – Repeal of K.S.A. 76-731a, which grants residency for tuition purposes to certain unlawful immigrants. February 3, 2009
- H 2206 – Amendments to late term and partial birth abortion law. March 5, 2009

== Major donors ==
The top five donors to Brown's 2008 campaign:

- 1. Prairie Band Potawatomi Nation – $1,000
- 2. Kansas Bankers Assoc. – $1,000
- 3. Koch Industries – $1,000
- 4. Farmers Insurance Group – $1,000
- 5. Hodgdon, Mary Jane – $1,000
