= Bob Lyon =

American politician

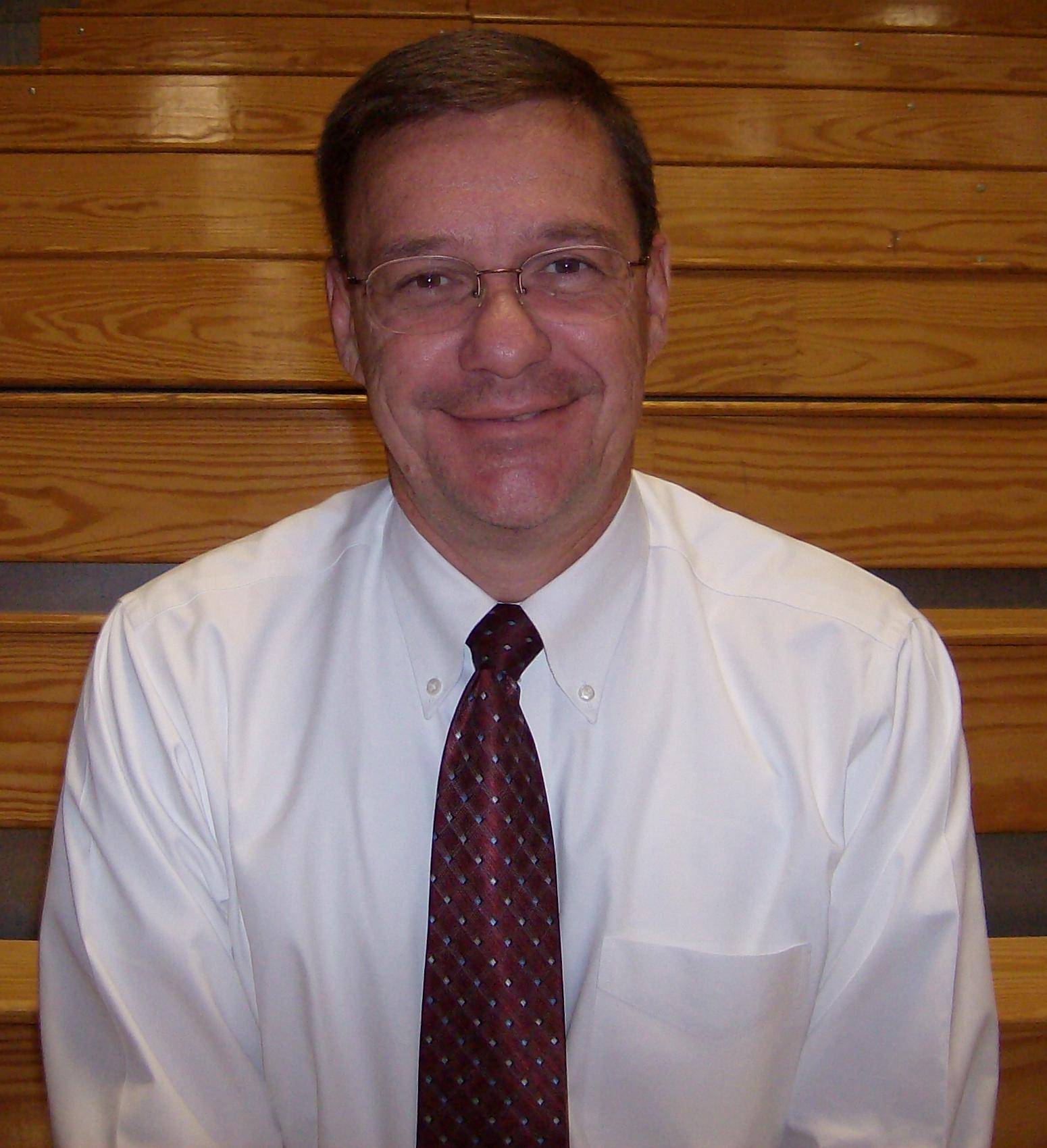

Member of the Kansas State Senate from the 3rd District
- In office 2001–2004
- Preceded by: Donald Biggs
- Succeeded by: Roger Pine

Personal details
- Born: March 24, 1955 Oak Park, Illinois
- Party: Republican
- Spouse: Rita Lyon
- Children: 3 daughters
- Education: University of Virginia, George Washington University

Bob Lyon (born March 24, 1955), an American politician, is a former Kansas State Senator from the city of Winchester. A civil engineer, Lyon is a graduate of the University of Virginia and George Washington University.

A Republican, Lyon was elected to the Third District seat of the Kansas Senate in 2000. He defeated two Leavenworth residents to win the Republican nomination, and he beat Democratic nominee Mike Gibbens by somewhat more than 1,500 votes in the general election. In his term in the Senate, he served on four committees:

- Federal and State Affairs (of which he was the vice chairman)
- Joint Legislative Educational Planning
- Transportation
- Utilities

He served a single four-year term, declining to run for reelection and being succeeded by Roger Pine in 2005.

With his wife Rita, Lyon has three daughters. He is an elder in the Reformed Presbyterian Church of North America, serving on the session of the denomination's Winchester congregation.
