= Roger Pine =

American politician

Member of the Kansas State Senate from the 3rd District
- In office 2005–2008
- Preceded by: Bob Lyon
- Succeeded by: Tom Holland

Personal details
- Born: January 11, 1940 Lawrence, Kansas
- Party: Republican
- Spouse: Sue Pine

Roger Pine (born January 11, 1940) is an American former politician who served one term in the Kansas State Senate.

Pine was born in Lawrence, Kansas, and made his living as a farmer there. In 2004, he ran successfully won election as a Republican, stressing his credentials as a farmer and business owner, and emphasizing his beliefs in encouraging the growth of small business in Kansas. Pine narrowly defeated Democrat Jan Justice, taking 52% of the vote to her 48%. The incumbent, fellow Republican Bob Lyon, did not seek reelection.

In his 2008 reelection bid, Pine faced another close election, ultimately losing to Democratic challenger Tom Holland; Holland took 48% of the vote, Pine took 46%, and 5% was claimed by Libertarian Patrick Wilbur.
