= Mike Thompson (Kansas representative) =

American politician

Member of the Kansas House of Representatives from the 33rd district
- In office January 9, 2023 – August 31, 2025
- Preceded by: Tom Burroughs
- Succeeded by: Carolyn Caiharr

Personal details
- Party: Republican

Mike Thompson is an American politician from the Kansas Republican Party. He served as a member of the Kansas House of Representatives representing District 33 from 2023 to 2025.

== Career ==
Prior to joining the Kansas House, Thompson served in the U.S. Navy with SEAL Team Two, then later in the U.S. Army as Command Chaplain for the 82nd Airborne, 7th Special Forces Group, and Delta Force.

As a civilian, Thompson has served as a police officer and ministered as a chaplain in five different hospitals. In his career, he also worked for the Union Pacific Railroad and owned a welding shop.

== Politics ==
In the 2022 Kansas House election, Thompson defeated Democratic candidate Bill Hutton and Libertarian candidate Stephanie Barton by a vote of 51.4% to 45.8% to 2.8% respectively.

In the Kansas House of Representatives, Thompson served on the committees for Veterans and Military, Financial Institutions and Pensions, Corrections and Juvenile Justice, and Taxation.

Thompson resigned from the Kansas House in August 2025 to better care for his wife who is battling Parkinson's disease.
