= Jeff Colyer =

Governor of Kansas from 2018 to 2019

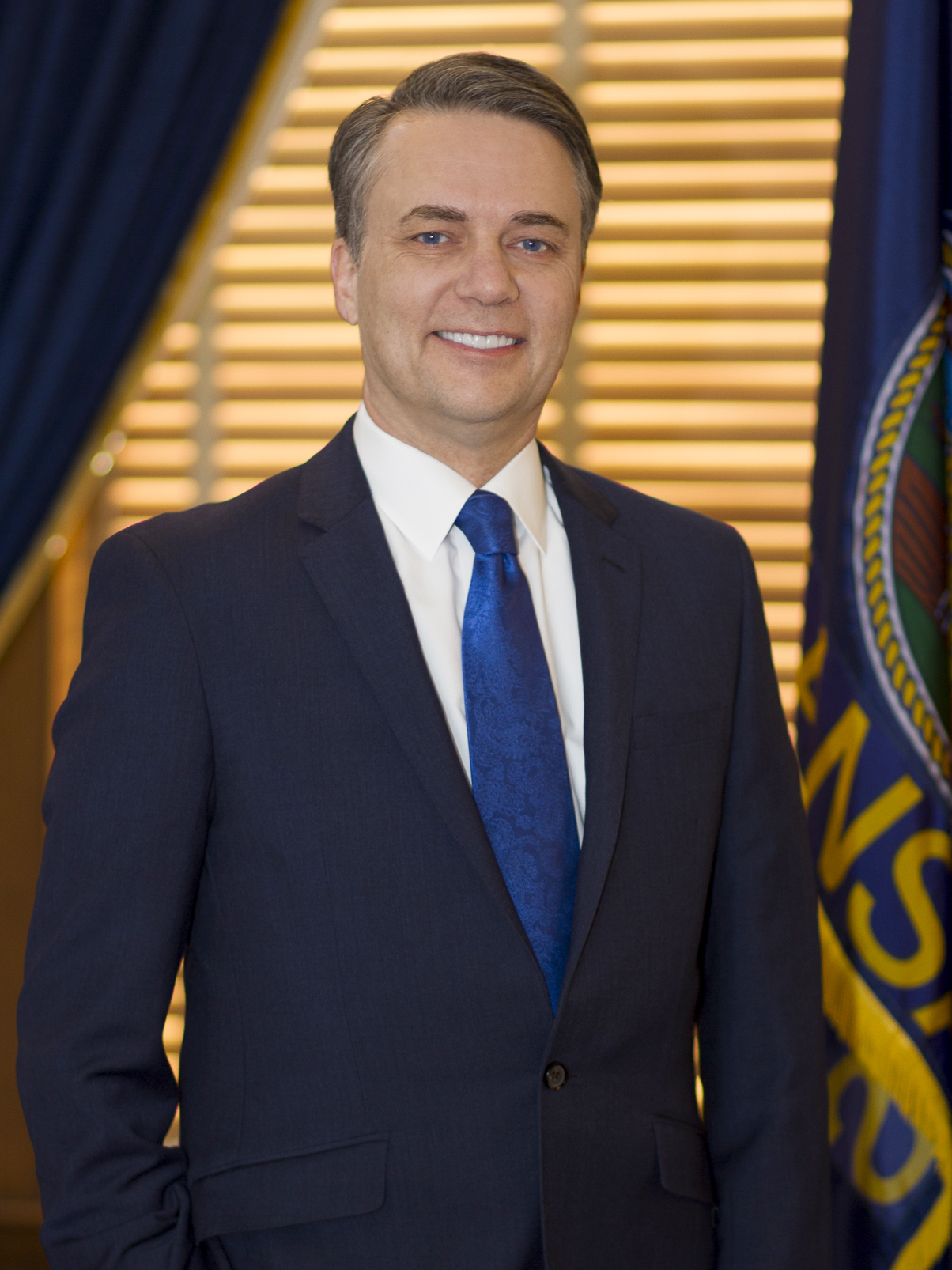
- Official portrait, 2018

United States Ambassador to the United Arab Emirates
- Nominee
- Assuming office TBD
- President: Donald Trump
- Succeeding: Shannon Dolan (chargé d'affaires)

47th Governor of Kansas
- In office January 31, 2018 – January 14, 2019
- Lieutenant: Tracey Mann
- Preceded by: Sam Brownback
- Succeeded by: Laura Kelly

49th Lieutenant Governor of Kansas
- In office January 10, 2011 – January 31, 2018
- Governor: Sam Brownback
- Preceded by: Troy Findley
- Succeeded by: Tracey Mann

Member of the Kansas Senate from the 37th district
- In office January 12, 2009 – January 10, 2011
- Preceded by: Dennis Wilson
- Succeeded by: Raymond Merrick

Member of the Kansas House of Representatives from the 48th district
- In office January 8, 2007 – January 12, 2009
- Preceded by: Eric Carter
- Succeeded by: Marvin Kleeb

Personal details
- Born: Jeffrey William Colyer; June 3, 1960 (age 66) Hays, Kansas, U.S.
- Party: Republican
- Spouse: Ruth Gutierrez
- Children: 3
- Education: Georgetown University (BS); Clare Hall, Cambridge (MA); University of Kansas (MD)

Jeffrey William Colyer (born June 3, 1960) is an American surgeon and politician who was the 47th governor of Kansas from 2018 to 2019. A member of the Republican Party, he was the 49th lieutenant governor of Kansas from 2011 to 2018. In November 2026, Colyer was nominated to be the U.S. ambassador to the United Arab Emirates.

Colyer served in the Kansas House of Representatives from 2007 to 2009 and the Kansas Senate from 2009 to 2011. He assumed the governorship when Sam Brownback resigned to become United States Ambassador-at-Large for International Religious Freedom. Colyer ran for a full term as governor in 2018, but narrowly lost the Republican primary to Kansas secretary of state Kris Kobach, who in turn lost the general election to Democratic nominee Laura Kelly.

== Early life and education ==
Colyer was raised in Hays, where his father, James Daniel Colyer (d. 2015), worked as a dentist from 1955 to 1985. He graduated from Thomas More Prep High School in 1978 before enrolling at Georgetown University, where he took pre-med courses and earned a bachelor's degree in economics in 1981. After receiving a master's degree in international relations from Clare Hall, Cambridge in 1982, he obtained his Doctor of Medicine degree from the University of Kansas in 1986.

== Early career ==
Colyer had residency training in general surgery at the Washington Hospital Center (1986–1988, 1989–1991), in plastic surgery at the University of Missouri–Kansas City (1991–1993), and in craniofacial/pediatric plastic surgery at the International Craniofacial Institute in Dallas, Texas (1993–1994).

Colyer was a White House fellow under presidents Ronald Reagan and George H. W. Bush, working in international affairs.

In 1994 Colyer opened his own plastic/craniofacial surgery practice in Overland Park, Kansas and Kansas City, Missouri. He volunteers with the International Medical Corps, providing care in such areas as Kosovo and Sierra Leone; in this capacity, he has performed both trauma and reconstructive surgery as well as training local doctors. Colyer's work as a volunteer surgeon in combat zones has taken him to Afghanistan and Iraq, and to Rwanda during that country's genocide.

== Political career ==
In the 2002 U.S. House of Representatives elections, Colyer ran for the Republican nomination in Kansas's 3rd congressional district; he was defeated by Adam Taff, who narrowly lost the general election to incumbent Democrat Dennis Moore.

In 2006, Colyer was elected to the Kansas House of Representatives from the 48th district, receiving 62% in a three-way race. As a freshman legislator, he was selected to serve as chairman of the 2007 Legislative Health Reform Task Force. In 2008 he was elected to the Kansas Senate to represent the 37th district, receiving 63% in another three-way race. According to the National Institute on Money in State Politics, Colyer financed $25,000 of his own campaign.

While in the state Senate, Colyer co-sponsored an amendment to require Senate consent for Supreme Court appointments and an amendment to create a budget stabilization fund. Colyer received a rating of 75 on conservative issues from the Kansas Chapter of Americans for Prosperity.

=== Lieutenant Governor of Kansas ===
==== 2010 gubernatorial election ====
On June 1, 2010, U.S. senator Sam Brownback announced that Colyer would be his running mate in his bid to become governor of Kansas. Brownback and Colyer were elected on November 2, 2010, and assumed office in January 2011. Colyer resigned his state senate seat on January 10, 2011, prior to taking the oath of office as lieutenant governor.

==== 2014 gubernatorial election ====
In October 2013 Kansas state representative Paul Davis, the Democratic minority leader of the Kansas House of Representatives, announced he would challenge Brownback in the 2014 Kansas gubernatorial election. In July 2014 more than 100 Kansas Republican officials endorsed Davis. These Kansas Republicans said their concern was related to deep cuts in education and other government services as well as tax cuts that had left the state with a large deficit.

In late September 2014 Colyer's chief of staff, Tim Keck, unearthed and publicized a 1998 police report that noted that Davis, 26 and unmarried at the time, had been briefly detained during a raid on a strip club. Davis was found to have no involvement in the cause for the raid and quickly allowed to leave. Responding to criticism of Keck's involvement in the campaign, Brownback spokesman Paul Milburn said that it was legal to use taxpayer-paid staff to campaign. Media law experts were amazed after learning that Montgomery County's sheriff had released non-public investigative files from 1998 with just a records request. Brownback and Colyer were reelected, defeating Davis by a 3.69% margin.

==== Tenure ====
Numerous judges had rejected challenges to the natural-born citizenship of Barack Obama since before he was elected president in 2008, but Kansas secretary of state Kris Kobach persistently demanded proof of citizenship before allowing Obama's name to appear on the 2012 Kansas presidential ballot. In September 2012, Kobach, with the support of both other State Objections Board members, Colyer and Kansas attorney general Derek Schmidt, requested additional evidence that Obama was born in the United States. CNN reported that "the Kansas ballot measure is one of several examples of the birther movement's still-persistent presence." The New York Times noted that the Kansas authorities' actions "reignited long-running conspiracy theories that the president was not born in the United States". According to the Topeka Capital-Journal, the three said they did not have sufficient evidence as to whether Obama was eligible to appear on the Kansas ballot as a candidate for the 2012 presidential election. They stated a need to review his birth certificate and other documents from Hawaii, Arizona, and Mississippi before they could respond to a complaint alleging that the president was not a "natural born citizen". "Given the cursory response from President Obama, the Board is merely attempting to obtain additional information before making a decision," said Kobach's spokesperson.

As lieutenant governor, Colyer led the Kansas Medicaid transformation, which has saved Kansans $2 billion since 2013 while increasing services. KanCare has led to a 23% reduction in in-patient hospital stays, a 24% increase in members using a primary care physician and a 10% increase in outpatient, non-emergency treatment.

Colyer "and others in the Brownback administration were investigated and cleared by a federal grand jury as part of an inquiry into loans made in 2013 and 2014 to [Governor Brownback's] re-election campaign".

=== Governor of Kansas ===
On July 26, 2017, President Donald Trump nominated Brownback to be U.S. ambassador-at-large for International Religious Freedom in Washington, D.C. Brownback resigned the governorship on January 31, 2018, to be sworn in as ambassador, making Colyer governor.

On January 31, 2018, Colyer was sworn in as the 47th governor of Kansas. As his first order of business, he signed an executive order requiring all employees and interns working for executive branch agencies in Kansas to undergo yearly sexual harassment training. It was the first mandatory sexual harassment training policy put in place by a governor.

As lieutenant governor and governor, Colyer supported laws restricting abortion. Colyer denounced court decisions striking down those laws as unconstitutional; After the Kansas Supreme Court struck down a state anti-abortion law as a violation of the state constitution, Colyer proposed a state constitutional amendment to overturn the ruling.

In May 2018, Colyer issued an executive order establishing a "ban the box" policy for state jobs; the order prevented Kansas state agencies from asking applicants about their criminal history during the initial phase of the hiring process.

During his tenure Colyer signed several transparency bills into law. One law helped police body camera video become more accessible after an officer-involved shooting. Another required the Kansas Department for Children and Families to release more information following the death of a child in the state's custody or after reports of abuse. Colyer also signed bipartisan legislation expanding rules for lobbyists. Under the new law, anyone trying to influence an executive branch official on contracts must register as a lobbyist.

Colyer also increased funding to public schools by $500 million over five years. The investment came in response to a Kansas Supreme Court ruling that schools had not been properly funded for several years. The money was intended to help rural and low-income school districts as well as increase teacher salaries. As governor, Colyer also approved more money for the Kansas National Guard to help National Guard Members with tuition assistance to increase the number of National Guard members.

Colyer also signed into law the Adoption Protection Act, which allows religious adoption groups to refuse to offer adoptions to gay couples.

Following his defeat in the 2018 Republican primary, Colyer left office with Kansas having a $900 million budget surplus.

==== 2018 gubernatorial election ====
Colyer sought a full term as governor in the 2018 gubernatorial election. During the campaign Colyer was supported by former U.S. Senate majority leader and 1996 Republican presidential nominee Bob Dole, the NRA Political Victory Fund, and the Kansas Farm Bureau. One day before the election, his main Republican primary opponent, Secretary of State Kris Kobach, was endorsed by both Donald Trump and state Senate president Susan Wagle. Following the August 7 primary, Kobach narrowly led Colyer by a margin of 191 votes. By August 9, his lead stood at 121 votes, but discrepancies in some counties needed resolution and provisional and absentee ballots may not have been counted in some counties. After more votes were counted, Colyer conceded to Kobach on August 14, becoming the first incumbent governor to lose a primary election since Hawaii governor Neil Abercrombie in 2014 election, who lost the Democratic primary to David Ige.

Kobach lost the general election to the Democratic nominee, State Senator Laura Kelly, by 53,082 votes.

== Post-governorship ==
In February 2020, HHS Secretary Alex Azar appointed Colyer to chair the National Advisory Committee on Rural Health (NACRHHS).

=== 2022 gubernatorial election ===
Colyer campaigned for the Republican nomination in the 2022 gubernatorial election, but withdrew from the race in August 2021, after being diagnosed with prostate cancer.

=== 2026 gubernatorial election ===
On May 14, 2025, Colyer announced his campaign for the Republican nomination in the 2026 gubernatorial election. On June 1, 2026, he announced that he was dropping out of the race.

=== Ambassador nomination ===
On November 9, 2026, President Donald Trump nominated Colyer to be the U.S. ambassador to the United Arab Emirates.

== Personal life ==
Colyer has been married to Ruth Gutierrez since 1991. They have three daughters.

On August 30, 2021, Colyer announced he had been diagnosed with prostate cancer, a disease that both his father and grandfather had been afflicted with. He said he had started treatment and was "confident for a full recovery."

== Electoral history ==
Kansas House of Representatives District 48 Republican Primary Election, 2006
Party	Candidate	Votes	%
Republican	Jeff Colyer	1,455	63.9
Republican	Sherrelyn Smith	595	26.1
Republican	Jeff Ippel	224	9.8

Kansas House of Representatives District 48 Election, 2006
Party	Candidate	Votes	%
Republican	Jeff Colyer	6,805	61.7
Democratic	Pam Ippel	3,975	36.0
Libertarian	Lorianne Fisher Koneczny	243	2.2

Kansas State Senate District 37 Republican Primary Election, 2008
Party	Candidate	Votes	%
Republican	Jeff Colyer	5,202	69.4
Republican	Steve Baru	2,285	30.5

Kansas State Senate District 37 Election, 2008
Party	Candidate	Votes	%
Republican	Jeff Colyer	27,311	63.4
Democratic	Bond Faulwell	13,249	30.7
Libertarian	Rob Hodgkinson	2,464	5.7

Governor's election in Kansas, 2010
Party	Candidate	Votes	%
Republican	Sam Brownback – Jeff Colyer	530,760	63.28
Democratic	Tom Holland – Kelly Kultala	270,166	32.21
Libertarian	Andrew Gray – Stacey Davis	22,460	2.68
Reform	Ken Cannon – Dan Faubion	15,397	1.84
Total votes		838,790	100.0
Republican gain from Democratic			

Governor's election in Kansas, 2014
Party	Candidate	Votes	%
Republican	Sam Brownback – Jeff Colyer	433,196	49.82
Democratic	Paul Davis – Jill Docking	401,100	46.13
Libertarian	Keen A. Umbehr – Josh Umbehr	35,206	4.05
Total votes		869,502	100.00

Party political offices
Preceded by Susan Wagle	Republican nominee for Lieutenant Governor of Kansas; 2010, 2014	Succeeded by Wink Hartman
Political offices
Preceded by Troy Findley	Lieutenant Governor of Kansas; 2011–2018	Succeeded by Tracey Mann
Preceded by Sam Brownback	Governor of Kansas; 2018–2019	Succeeded by Laura Kelly
U.S. order of precedence (ceremonial)
Preceded by Mark Parkinson as Former Governor	Order of precedence of the United States; Within Kansas	Succeeded by Jack Markell as Former Governor
Preceded by Mark Parkinson as Former Governor	Order of precedence of the United States; Outside Kansas	Succeeded by Gaston Caperton as Former Governor
