= Troy Findley =

American politician

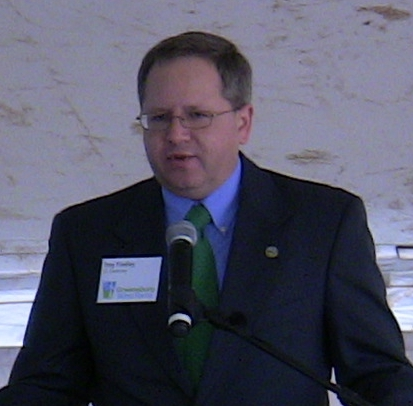

48th Lieutenant Governor of Kansas
- In office May 15, 2009 – January 10, 2011
- Governor: Mark Parkinson
- Preceded by: Mark Parkinson
- Succeeded by: Jeff Colyer

Chief of Staff to the Governor of Kansas
- In office July 18, 2005 – May 15, 2009
- Governor: Kathleen Sebelius; Mark Parkinson
- Preceded by: Joyce Allegrucci
- Succeeded by: David Kensinger

Member of the Kansas House of Representatives from the 46th district
- In office January 9, 1995 – January 13, 2003
- Preceded by: Betty Jo Charlton
- Succeeded by: Paul Davis

Personal details
- Born: July 11, 1964 (age 62) Lawrence, Kansas, U.S.
- Party: Democratic
- Spouse: Jennifer Findley
- Children: Zachary R. Findley
- Parent: Paul And Virginia Findley
- Education: University of Kansas (BGS)

Troy Findley (born July 11, 1964) is an American politician who served as the 48th lieutenant governor of Kansas from 2009 to 2011. A member of the Democratic Party, he was appointed by newly-installed Governor Mark Parkinson. Findley previously served as the Kansas State Representative for the 46th district from 1995 to 2003 and Chief of Staff to the governor of Kansas from 2005 until 2009.

As Kansas Lieutenant Governor, Findley chaired both the Governor's Energy Cabinet Team and Governor's Recovery Act Advisory Group. He was also a member of the Midwest Cancer Alliance Partner Advisory Board.

A native Kansan, he was raised and educated in Lawrence and graduated from the University of Kansas in 1990. After college he worked in the grocery, retail and banking industry before his election to the Kansas House of Representatives in November 1994. Findley, a moderate, had won election despite nationwide loses for the Democratic Party, specifically in both houses of the United States Congress.

== Education and early career ==
Findley was born on July 11, 1964, in Lawrence, Kansas. He was educated in the Lawrence Public Schools and attended Lawrence High School.

Findley attended the University of Kansas and graduated in 1990 with a bachelor's degree in political science. He received his real estate license from the Kansas Association of Realtors in 1995.

Following college, Findley held a number of positions in Kansas politics and later worked at UMB Bank in Lawrence.

== State legislature ==
Findley was first elected to the Kansas House of Representatives on November 8, 1994 to represent District 46, which includes parts of Douglas County. He replaced retiring, longtime State Representative Betty Jo Charlton and was subsequently elected to five consecutive terms.

In the Kansas House, Findley led efforts to initiate early childhood education programs for at-risk four-year-olds and to establish multi-year financing for public schools. Concerned with the rising cost of a college education, Findley also authored legislation to tie increases in tuition to increases in the state's grant program.

Findley also co-sponsored legislation to create a Kansas version of the Earned Income Tax Credit, similar to legislation passed by the U.S. Congress in 1975, which helps ease the burden of income taxes on low-income families.

During the 1999 budget debate, Findley voted for the 10-year transportation plan that is largely credited for Kansas’ recent number one ranking for having the nation's best highways. In the same session, he crossed party lines to support Republican Governor Bill Graves’ budget, which included the creation of a Children's Trust Fund.

Findley was a member of the House Democratic Leadership Team serving as Policy Chair. His committee assignments included: Financial Institutions and Insurance; Economic Development; Ethics and Elections; Federal and State Affairs; and Taxation. He also served as Ranking Minority Member of the Congressional Redistricting Committee during the 2001–2002 Sessions.

He was elected to his fifth term in the Kansas House of Representatives on November 5, 2002 but declined to take the oath of office in order to work for Governor Sebelius as a Legislative Liaison in January 2003.

== Legislative Liaison ==
Upon her ascension to the governorship, Kathleen Sebelius hired Findley as her Legislative Liaison to the Kansas House of Representatives.

While Findley served in this capacity, the Sebelius Administration shepherded through government austerity and efficiency measurers that eliminated the state's $1.1 billion deficit, without raising taxes.

== Chief of Staff ==
On July 18, 2005 Governor Sebelius appointed Findley as her chief of staff.

In this capacity, Findley was responsible for policy development and implementation.

During the 2006 legislative session, the Sebelius Administration led efforts that resulted in the largest increase in K-12 education funding in state history.

Findley's responsibilities also included serving as the Governor's chief liaison on emergency management matters. In 2007, Kansas was impacted by a series of major weather-related disasters ranging from ice storms, to floods and tornadoes. On May 4, 2007, an F5 tornado devastated the town of Greensburg, Kansas. Findley assisted in the state government's response. With encouragement from the Sebelius Administration, the residents of Greensburg embarked on an effort to rebuild their town using renewable and efficient building methods.

== Lieutenant Governor of Kansas ==
=== Appointment ===
On April 28, 2009, then-Governor Kathleen Sebelius was confirmed by the United States Senate as the 21st Secretary of Health and Human Services. Lieutenant Governor Mark Parkinson was sworn in as Kansas's 45th governor on the same day.

Findley is sworn in as the 48th Lieutenant Governor of Kansas

On May 14, 2009, Governor Parkinson appointed Findley as the state's 48th lieutenant governor. Parkinson cited Findley's fitness for office and bipartisan record in his remarks at the swearing in ceremony.

=== Responsibilities ===
Findley's responsibilities as lieutenant governor include serving as the senior strategic advisor to the governor and, as prescribed by the Kansas Constitution, serving as acting governor when Parkinson is out of the state.

In addition to those responsibilities, Findley chairs both the Governor's Energy Cabinet Team and the Governor's Recovery Act Advisory Group. He is also the Governor's designee to the Midwest Cancer Alliance Partner Advisory Board.

=== 2010 Legislative Session ===
In the first months of the Parkinson-Findley Administration, state revenues slipped significantly as the global economic downturn took a toll on the state's income tax returns. Because the Kansas Constitution requires a balanced budget, Governor Parkinson instituted over $1 billion in spending cuts using his allotment authority, more than any governor in Kansas history.

During the 2010 legislative session, the Parkinson-Findley Administration led a bipartisan coalition of Democrats and moderate Republicans on a successful effort to balance the budget without additional cuts to schools, Medicaid, law enforcement and other social services.

In the same session, the Parkinson-Findley Administration spearheaded successful efforts to pass a 10-year, $8.4 billion comprehensive transportation plan.

Other significant legislation included passage of primary seatbelt law, a ban on texting while driving, a statewide indoor smoking ban, as well as increased penalties for drunk drivers.

=== Post Session ===
In the final months of the Parkinson-Findley Administration, Findley has focused on expanding renewable energy and energy efficiency opportunities in Kansas. As chair of the Governor's Energy Cabinet Team, Findley has actively supported efforts to build the transmission lines in Western Kansas that will enable the region to generate and export renewable energy.

The Energy Cabinet Team's final report indicated positive growth in the renewable energy sector during the Parkinson/Findley Administration and encouraged the next administration to continue their pro-renewable energy policies.

== Personal ==
Findley lives in Topeka with his wife, Jennifer. They have a son Zachary.

== Organizations ==
- Chair, Governor's Energy Cabinet Team
- Governors Designee, Midwest Cancer Alliance Partner Advisory Board
- Lawrence Chamber of Commerce
- University of Kansas Alumni Association

Political offices
Preceded by Mark Parkinson	Lieutenant Governor of Kansas; 2009–2011	Succeeded by Jeff Colyer
