= Denise Apt =

Politician from Kansas, US

Member of the Kansas House of Representatives from the 10th district
- In office January 12, 1981 – January 9, 1989
- Preceded by: George H. Works
- Succeeded by: Alden Ensminger

Personal details
- Born: December 10, 1929 Maywood, Illinois, U.S.
- Died: November 3, 2014 (aged 84) Iola, Kansas, U.S.
- Party: Republican
- Spouse: Frederick Apt
- Education: Iowa State University and University of Arkansas
- Profession: Housewife

Denise Coleman Apt (December 10, 1929 - November 3, 2014) was an American politician who served as a member of the Kansas House of Representatives as the representative from the 10th District in Allen County, Kansas from 1981 to 1989.

Born Denise Coleman in Maywood, Illinois, Representative Apt attended Iowa State University and the University of Arkansas, where she studied engineering. She was married to Frederick Apt Jr. and lived in Iola, Kansas. A Republican, Representative Apt was the president of the USD 257 Board of Education for 12 years before being elected to the Kansas State Board of Education, where she served for three years. She was appointed to a vacant seat in the Kansas House of Representatives in 1981 and reelected in 1982, 1984 and 1986. During her tenure in the House, she served as chairman of the House Education Committee. After leaving the Kansas Legislature she was an education policy advisor to Gov. Mike Hayden.

During the 2014 gubernatorial election, she was part of a group of moderate Republican former lawmakers who endorsed Democrat Paul Davis over Republican Gov. Sam Brownback.
