= Jayne Aylward =

American politician (born 1956)

Member of the Kansas House of Representatives from the 74th district
- In office January 8, 1979 – January 14, 1991
- Preceded by: Ward Ferguson
- Succeeded by: Ellen Samuelson

Personal details
- Born: August 28, 1956 (age 69)
- Party: Republican

Jayne Anne Aylward (born August 28, 1956) is an American politician who served as a Republican member of the Kansas House of Representatives as the representative from the 74th district in Saline County, Kansas, from 1979 to 1991. Following her service in the Kansas Legislature, she became an administrative tax judge with the Kansas Board of Tax Appeals.

Aylward is a rancher and stockwoman, and runs her own accountancy firm. During the 1985–1986 legislative session, she was the chairman of the House Communications, Computers and Technology Committee. In 2012 she joined the steering committee of Republicans for Kansas Values, a group of moderate Republicans opposed to the tax cuts enacted by Gov. Sam Brownback. In 2014 she joined other moderate Republicans in endorsing Democrat Paul Davis for governor over Brownback.
