= Carolyn Caiharr =

American politician

Member of the Kansas House of Representatives from the 33rd district
- Incumbent
- Assumed office September 5, 2025
- Preceded by: Mike Thompson

Personal details
- Party: Republican

Carolyn Caiharr is an American politician. She has served as the representative for the 33rd district in the Kansas House of Representatives since September 2025. She was selected by a local Republican precinct committee to replace outgoing representative Mike Thompson, who resigned and retired from politics to care for his wife.

A member of the Republican Party, Caiharr concurrently serves as the mayor of Edwardsville, Kansas.
