= Rob Boyer =

American politician (born 1968)

Member of the Kansas House of Representatives from the 38th district
- In office 2003–2004
- Preceded by: Margaret Long
- Succeeded by: Anthony Brown

Personal details
- Born: September 5, 1968 (age 57) Kingman, Kansas
- Party: Republican

Rob Boyer (born September 5, 1968) is an American politician who served in the Kansas House of Representatives as a Republican from the 38th district from 2003 to 2004. Boyer was elected in 2002, and declined to run for re-election in 2004; he was succeeded by fellow Republican Anthony Brown.
