= Kansas's 3rd Senate district =

American legislative district

Kansas's 3rd State Senate district
Senator
Rick Kloos; R–Baldwin City
- Demographics: 82% White; 3% Black; 6% Hispanic; 3% Asian; 2% Native American; 4% Other
- Population (2018): 76,598

Kansas's 3rd Senate district is one of 40 districts in the Kansas Senate. It has been represented by Republican Rick Kloos since 2025.

== Geography ==
District 3 covers most of Douglas County outside of Lawrence and most of Leavenworth County outside of Leavenworth, including the communities of Eudora, Baldwin City, Basehor, Tonganoxie, and parts of Lansing and Lawrence proper.

The district is located entirely within Kansas's 2nd congressional district, and overlaps with the 10th, 38th, 40th, 42nd, 44th, 45th, 46th, and 54th districts of the Kansas House of Representatives. It borders the state of Missouri.

== Recent election results ==
=== 2020 ===
2020 Kansas Senate election, District 3
Party	Candidate	Votes	%
Democratic	Tom Holland (incumbent)	20,490	51.2
Republican	Willie Dove	19,500	48.8
Total votes		39,990	100
Democratic hold			

=== 2016 ===
2016 Kansas Senate election, District 3
Party	Candidate	Votes	%
Democratic	Tom Holland (incumbent)	17,214	51.5
Republican	Echo Van Meteren	16,189	48.5
Total votes		33,403	100
Democratic hold			

=== 2012 ===
2012 Kansas Senate election, District 3
Primary election
Party	Candidate	Votes	%
Republican	Anthony Brown	3,136	68.4
Republican	J.C. Tellefson	1,449	31.6
Total votes		4,585	100
General election
Democratic	Tom Holland (incumbent)	16,678	53.2
Republican	Anthony Brown	14,658	46.8
Total votes		31,336	100
Democratic hold			

=== Federal and statewide results ===
Year	Office	Results
2020	President	Trump 50.1 – 47.4%
2018	Governor	Kelly 55.9 – 37.0%
2016	President	Trump 49.4 – 42.8%
2012	President	Romney 51.0 – 46.4%
