= Tom Burroughs =

American politician (born 1954)

Member of the Kansas House of Representatives from the 33rd district
- In office January 13, 1997 – January 9, 2023
- Preceded by: Richard J. Edlund
- Succeeded by: Mike Thompson

Personal details
- Born: November 21, 1954 (age 71) Kansas City, Kansas, U.S.
- Party: Democratic
- Spouse: Cathie
- Education: Kansas City Kansas Community College
- Profession: Retired
- Website: https://www.burroughsformayor.com

Tom Burroughs (born November 21, 1954) is an American politician who was a Democratic member of the Kansas House of Representatives, representing the 33rd district, in which he served as the House Minority Leader. A native of Kansas City, Kansas, he served from 1997 until 2023.

Prior to his election, Burroughs ran unsuccessfully for the House in 1990 and 1992. He has an associate degree from Kansas City Community College and spent nearly 30 years working at the Colgate-Palmolive Company.

Burroughs was the chair of the Colgate-Palmolive Employees Credit Union and the Wy-Jo Chapter of Credit Unions.

Burroughs was named Mayor Pro Tempore of Kansas City, Kansas on January 29, 2024, when Mayor Tyrone Garner underwent a confidential medical procedure. No timeline was given for Garner's return. Burroughs is currently a candidate for mayor/CEO of Kansas City, KS.
