= Willie Dove =

American politician

Member of the Kansas House of Representatives from the 38th district
- In office January 14, 2013 – January 11, 2021
- Preceded by: Anthony Brown
- Succeeded by: Timothy H. Johnson

Personal details
- Born: December 22, 1945 (age 80) Kansas, U.S.
- Party: Republican

Willie Dove (born December 22, 1945) is an American politician who served as a member of the Kansas House of Representatives from 2013 to 2021. He was elected in 2012. Previously, he was an unsuccessful candidate for the House of Representatives in 2004 and for the Kansas Board of Education in 2010. Dove is a Republican. He is African-American.
