= Tom Holland (politician) =

American politician

Member of the Kansas Senate from the 3rd district
- In office January 12, 2009 – January 13, 2025
- Preceded by: Roger Pine
- Succeeded by: Rick Kloos

Member of the Kansas House of Representatives from the 10th district
- In office January 13, 2003 – January 12, 2009
- Preceded by: Ralph Tanner
- Succeeded by: Tony Brown

Personal details
- Born: George Thomas Holland II; July 23, 1961 (age 65) Indianapolis, Indiana, U.S.
- Party: Democratic
- Spouse: Barbara
- Children: 4
- Education: Indiana University, Bloomington (BS); University of Minnesota, Twin Cities (MBA)

George Thomas Holland II (born July 23, 1961) is an American entrepreneur, educator and politician. He served as a Democratic member of the Kansas Senate, representing the 3rd district from 2009 to 2025. He was a member of the Kansas House of Representatives from 2003 to 2009.

He served as the ranking minority member on both the Senate Assessment and Taxation & Commerce committees and also served as the ranking minority member on the Joint Committee on Information Technology. He did not seek re-election in 2024.

== 2010 gubernatorial race ==
He announced on February 17, 2010, that he would seek the 2010 Democratic nomination to be the next Kansas Governor. Holland was defeated by more than 30 points by Sam Brownback in the general election.

== Professional career ==
Holland is an entrepreneur and small business owner. He is co-founder and president of Free State Firearms, LLC. Free State Firearms manufactures user-authenticated firearms. He also co-founded Holland Technologies in 1994, where he served as a senior IT project manager. He is also the founder and owner of a Kansas farm winery called Haven Pointe Winery LLC located in Baldwin City.

Holland is a professor at the KU School of Business (Lawrence campus). He teaches both undergraduate and graduate coursework including business strategy, small business ownership, project management and entrepreneurial finance.

== Personal life ==
Holland was born and raised in Indianapolis, Indiana. He and his wife Barbara have four children.

Party political offices
Preceded by Kathleen Sebelius	Democratic nominee for Governor of Kansas; 2010	Succeeded by Paul Davis
