= 2010 Kansas gubernatorial election =

- November 2, 2010
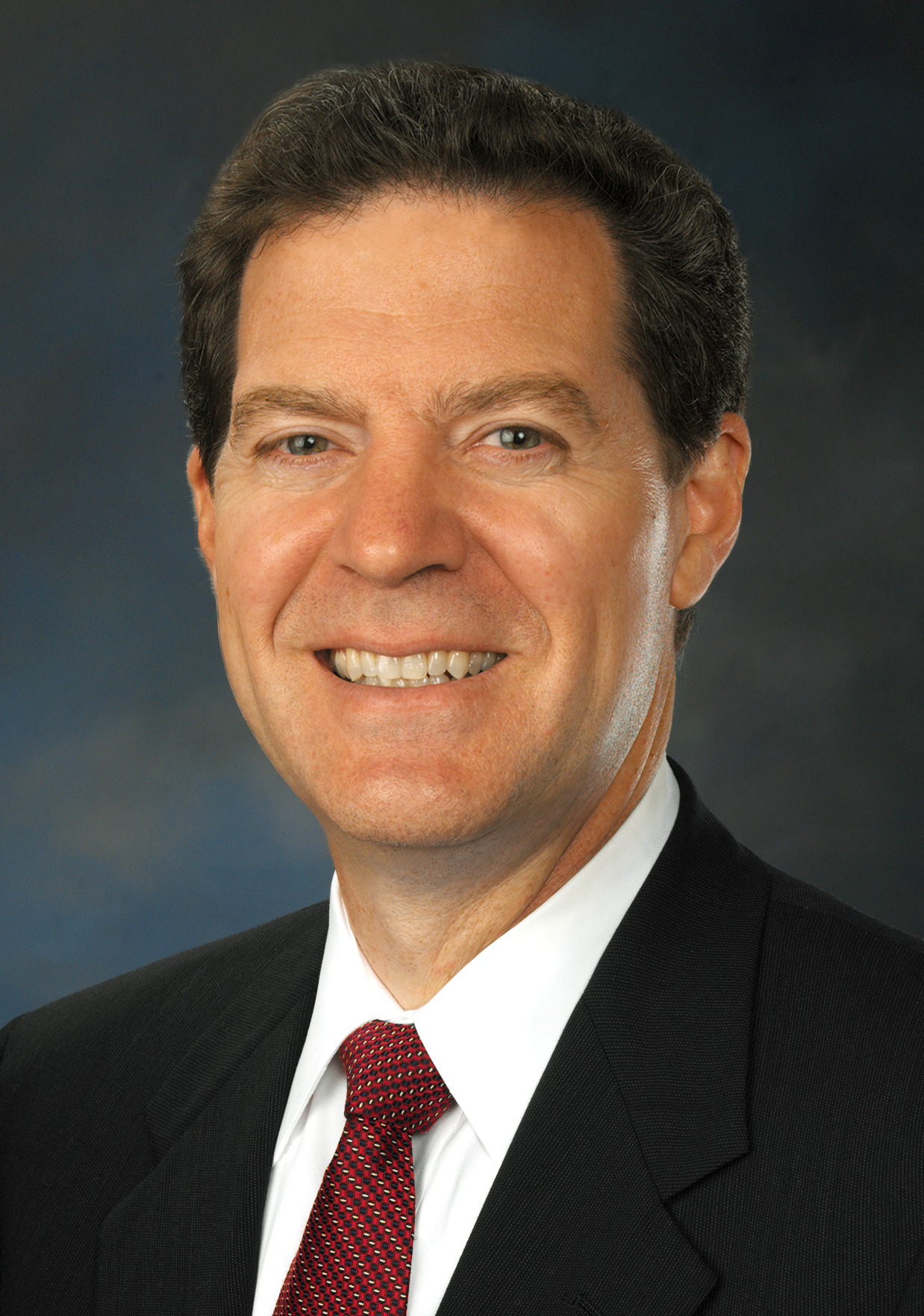

Nominee	Sam Brownback	Tom Holland
Party	Republican	Democratic
Running mate	Jeff Colyer	Kelly Kultala
Popular vote	530,760	270,166
Percentage	63.28%	32.21%
- County results Brownback: 50–60% 60–70% 70–80% 80–90% Holland: 60–70%
Governor before election
Mark Parkinson
Democratic
Elected Governor
Sam Brownback
Republican

The 2010 Kansas gubernatorial election was held on November 2, 2010, to elect the governor of Kansas. Republican U.S. senator Sam Brownback defeated Democratic state senator Tom Holland. Brownback succeeded Democratic incumbent Mark Parkinson, who declined to seek a full term, sworn into office after Kathleen Sebelius resigned to become secretary of health and human services.

This is the most recent occasion a Republican has secured a majority of the vote in a gubernatorial election, and the last time until 2026 that a candidate from either party did so.

== Democratic primary ==
=== Candidates ===
==== Nominee ====
- Tom Holland, state senator from the 3rd district (2009–2025)

=== Results ===
Democratic primary results
Party	Candidate	Votes	%
Democratic	Tom Holland	74,754	100.00
Total votes		74,754	100.00

== Republican primary ==
=== Candidates ===
==== Nominee ====
- Sam Brownback, U.S. senator (1996–2011)

==== Eliminated in primary ====
- Joan Heffington, businesswoman

=== Polling ===
Poll source	Dates administered	Sam Brownback	Joan Heffington
Survey USA	July 29 – August 1, 2010	75%	18%
Survey USA	July 15–18, 2010	73%	19%
Survey USA	June 24–27, 2010	76%	17%

=== Results ===
Republican primary results
Party	Candidate	Votes	%
Republican	Sam Brownback	263,920	82.20
Republican	Joan Heffington	57,160	17.80
Total votes		321,080	100.00

== General election ==
=== Predictions ===
Source	Ranking	As of
Cook Political Report	Safe R (flip)	October 26, 2010
CQ Politics	Likely R (flip)	October 28, 2010
RealClearPolitics	Safe R (flip)	October 26, 2010
Rothenberg	Safe R (flip)	October 22, 2010
Sabato's Crystal Ball	Safe R (flip)	October 21, 2010

=== Polling ===
Poll source	Dates administered	Sam Brownback (R)	Tom Holland (D)
Survey USA	September 16, 2010	59%	32%
Survey USA	August 12–15, 2010	67%	25%
Rasmussen Reports	August 4, 2010	57%	34%
Rasmussen Reports	June 30, 2010	59%	31%
Rasmussen Reports	May 11, 2010	58%	27%
Rasmussen Reports	March 1, 2010	55%	33%

=== Results ===
2010 Kansas gubernatorial election
Party	Candidate	Votes	%	±%
Republican	Sam Brownback	530,760	63.28%	+22.84%
Democratic	Tom Holland	270,166	32.21%	−25.69%
Libertarian	Andrew P. Gray	22,460	2.68%	+1.63%
Reform	Kenneth W. Cannon	15,397	1.84%	+1.22%
Write-ins		7	0.00%	
Majority		260,594	31.07%	+13.60%
Turnout		838,790		
Republican gain from Democratic		Swing		

==== Counties that flipped from Democratic to Republican ====
- Jefferson (largest municipality: Valley Falls)
- Crawford (largest city: Pittsburg)
- Riley (largest municipality: Manhattan)
- Shawnee (largest municipality: Topeka)
- Lyon (largest municipality: Emporia)
- Sherman (largest municipality: Goodland)
- Decatur (largest municipality: Oberlin)
- Sheridan (largest municipality: Hoxie)
- Graham (largest municipality: Hill City)
- Lane (largest municipality: Dighton)
- Trego (largest municipality: WaKeeney)
- Ford (largest municipality: Dodge City)
- Smith (largest municipality: Smith Center)
- Phillips (largest municipality: Phillipsburg)
- Rooks (largest municipality: Plainville)
- Osborne (largest municipality: Osborne)
- Russell (largest municipality: Russell)
- Ellis (largest municipality: Hays)
- Rush (largest municipality: La Crosse)
- Barton (largest municipality: Great Bend)
- Pawnee (largest municipality: Larned)
- Stafford (largest municipality: St. John)
- Edwards (largest municipality: Kinsley)
- Kiowa (largest municipality: Greensburg)
- Mitchell (largest municipality: Beloit)
- Lincoln (largest municipality: Lincoln)
- Ellsworth (largest municipality: Ellsworth)
- Rice (largest municipality: Lyons)
- Reno (largest municipality: Hutchinson)
- Kingman (largest municipality: Kingman)
- Harvey (largest municipality: Newton)
- Harper (largest municipality: Anthony)
- Sumner (largest municipality: Wellington)
- McPherson (largest municipality: McPherson)
- Saline (largest municipality: Salina)
- Ottawa (largest municipality: Minneapolis)
- Cloud (largest municipality: Concordia)
- Clay (largest municipality: Clay Center)
- Geary (largest city: Junction City)
- Dickinson (largest city: Abilene)
- Morris (largest city: Council Grove)
- Marshall (largest city: Marysville)
- Nemaha (largest city: Sabetha)
- Brown (largest city: Hiawatha)
- Doniphan (largest city: Wathena)
- Atchison (largest city: Atchison)
- Leavenworth (largest city: Leavenworth)
- Jackson (largest city: Holton)
- Osage (largest city: Osage City)
- Franklin (largest city: Ottawa)
- Miami (largest city: Spring Hill)
- Anderson (largest city: Garnett)
- Linn (largest city: Pleasanton)
- Woodson (largest city: Yates Center)
- Wilson (largest city: Neodesha)
- Allen (largest city: Iola)
- Bourbon (largest city: Fort Scott)
- Neosho (largest city: Chanute)
- Labette (largest city: Parsons)
- Cherokee (largest city: Baxter Springs)
- Johnson (largest municipality: Overland Park)
