= Paul Davis (Kansas politician) =

American politician

Minority Leader of the Kansas House of Representatives
- In office January 12, 2009 – January 12, 2015
- Preceded by: Dennis McKinney
- Succeeded by: Tom Burroughs

Member of the Kansas House of Representatives from the 46th district
- In office January 13, 2003 – January 12, 2015
- Preceded by: Troy Findley
- Succeeded by: Dennis Highberger

Personal details
- Born: July 12, 1972 (age 54) Woodland, California, U.S.
- Party: Democratic
- Spouses: Shelley Rogers (m. 2000; div. 2003) Stephanie Davis (m. 2008)
- Children: 1
- Education: University of Kansas (BA); Washburn University (JD)

Paul T. Davis (born July 12, 1972) is an American politician and lawyer. A Democrat, he represented the 46th district in the Kansas House of Representatives from 2003 to 2015, serving as minority leader from 2009 to 2015. Davis was the unsuccessful Democratic Party nominee in the 2014 Kansas gubernatorial election and also ran a close campaign for Congress in Kansas's 2nd congressional district in 2018.

== Early life, education, and career ==
Davis is the son of an elementary school teacher and a public administration professor at the University of Kansas. Davis attended Lawrence public schools and graduated from Lawrence High School. After receiving a Bachelor of Arts in political science from the University of Kansas, Davis went on to obtain a Juris Doctor from Washburn University School of Law. Davis and his wife, Stephanie, have a daughter who was born in 2010. Stephanie is a psychologist, specializing in the treatment of homeless veterans suffering from trauma.

Davis was first elected to the House in 2003 when his predecessor, Troy Findley, left the legislature to join the staff of newly elected Governor Kathleen Sebelius. He became the House Minority Leader in 2008, and worked with moderate republicans to pass a budget. Davis was an intern for former Kansas Senate Minority Leader Anthony Hensley and former Congressman Jim Slattery. He is a partner in the Lawrence, Kansas, law firm of Fagan, Emert & Davis, LLC, which specializes in commercial litigation, family law, personal injury litigation, business and corporate law, federal and state criminal defense, Social Security Disability, real estate including foreclosures.

== Political career ==
=== Kansas House of Representatives ===
Davis was appointed to serve in the Kansas House of Representatives in 2002. He represented the 46th district until 2015 and served as minority leader from 2009 to 2015. He was the Policy Chair for the House Democratic Caucus for three years prior to becoming minority leader of the Kansas House.

=== 2014 Kansas gubernatorial campaign ===
Davis ran for governor in 2014 against incumbent Republican Sam Brownback and Libertarian Keen Umbehr. Upon announcing his candidacy, Davis stated, "As Kansans, we believe we have a moral obligation to educate our children, reward hard work, build a strong middle class and cooperate with one another. These values are what make us Kansans." Davis's bid was endorsed by over 100 Kansas Republican politicians. One who did so was former Kansas Senate President Dick Bond. His rationale for doing so was created by the state's fiscal difficulties brought on by Brownback's substantial tax cutting policies. The organization Republicans for Kansas Values stated that their primary reason for the endorsement was not to elect a Democrat, but to defeat incumbent governor Sam Brownback.

Davis was defeated by Brownback in the general election, 49.8% to 46.1%.

=== 2018 U.S. House campaign ===
Davis was the Democratic Party's nominee in the 2018 election in Kansas's 2nd congressional district. The seat was open following the retirement of Republican incumbent Lynn Jenkins. Davis carried the 2nd district in 2014, when he lost a close contest for election as governor to incumbent Sam Brownback. The seat has flipped between parties repeatedly. It has been held by Democrat Jim Slattery, who stepped down to run for governor in 1994, and Republican Jim Ryun, who represented the district for six terms until he was unseated by one-term Democrat Nancy Boyda. Boyda, in turn, was defeated by Republican Lynn Jenkins in 2008. Jenkins declined to run for reelection in 2018. Republican Steve Watkins narrowly defeated Davis in the general election in November 2018.

=== Lobbying ===
Davis registered as a lobbyist in the state of Kansas in December 2020 and represents clients including tobacco, private health insurance, and casinos.

Kansas House of Representatives
Preceded by Dennis McKinney	Minority Leader of the Kansas House of Representatives; 2009–2015	Succeeded by Tom Burroughs
Party political offices
Preceded by Tom Holland	Democratic nominee for Governor of Kansas; 2014	Succeeded by Laura Kelly
