= 2012 Kansas elections =

- November 6, 2012

The Kansas 2012 general elections were held on November 6, 2012. Primary elections were held on August 7, 2012.

== U.S. House of Representatives ==
=== 1st congressional district ===
Republican incumbent Tim Huelskamp, who had represented the 1st district since 2011, won re-election unopposed.

=== 2nd congressional district ===
Republican incumbent Lynn Jenkins, who had represented the 2nd district since 2009, ran for re-election.

Tobias Schlingensiepen, a pastor and police chaplain, sought and received the Democratic nomination to challenge Jenkins. He defeated Scott Barnhart, a farmer, and Bob Eye, an attorney, in the Democratic primary. Dennis Hawver ran as a Libertarian.

Jenkins defeated Schlingensiepen and Hawver in the general election.

=== 3rd congressional district ===
Republican incumbent Kevin Yoder, who had represented the 3rd district since 2011, defeated Libertarian candidate Joel Balam to win re-election. No Democrats ran against Yoder.

=== 4th congressional district ===
Republican incumbent Mike Pompeo, who had represented the 4th district since 2011, ran for re-election.

Robert Tillman, a retired court officer who ran in the Democratic primary for the seat in 2010, sought and received the Democratic nomination to challenge Pompeo. He defeated Esau Freeman, a painter, in the Democratic primary.

Thomas Jefferson, a computer technician formerly known by the name Jack Talbert, ran as a Libertarian.

Pompeo defeated Tillman and Jefferson in the general election.

== State Legislature ==
=== Senate ===
Because of redistricting, all 40 members of the Kansas Senate are up for election. The state Senate currently consists of 31 Republicans, 8 Democrats, and 1 unaffiliated member (former Republican).

Open seats
District 7: Republican incumbent Terrie Huntington is retiring.

District 8: Republican incumbent Tim Owens was defeated in the primary.

District 11: Republican incumbent and Senate Vice President John Vratil is retiring.

District 12: This is a new seat, with no current incumbent.

District 13: Republican incumbent Bob Marshall was defeated in the primary.

District 14: This is a new seat, with no current incumbent.

District 21: This is a new seat, with no current incumbent.

District 22: Republican incumbent Roger Reitz was defeated in the primary.

District 24: Republican incumbent Pete Brungardt was defeated in the primary.

District 25: Unaffiliated (and former Republican) incumbent Jean Schodorf was defeated in the primary.

District 26: Republican incumbent Dick Kelsey was defeated in the primary.

District 33: Republican incumbent Ruth Teichman was defeated in the primary.

District 36 (old District 21): Republican incumbent Mark Taddiken is retiring.

District 39: Republican incumbent and Senate President Stephen Morris was defeated in the primary.

=== House of Representatives ===
All 125 members of the Kansas House of Representatives are up for election. The state House currently consists of 92 Republicans and 33 Democrats.

Open seats
District 1: Democratic incumbent Doug Gatewood is retiring.

District 3: Republican incumbent Terry Calloway is retiring.

District 4: Republican incumbent Caryn Tyson is running for the 12th district state Senate seat.

District 8 (old District 29): Republican incumbent Sheryl Spalding was defeated in the primary.

District 9: This is a new seat, with no current incumbent.

District 10: This is a new seat, with no current incumbent.

District 13: Republican incumbent Forrest Knox is running for the 14th district state Senate seat.

District 14: This is a new seat, with no current incumbent.

District 15: This is a new seat, with no current incumbent.

District 19: Republican incumbent Jim Denning is running for the 8th district state Senate seat.

District 22: Republican incumbent Greg A. Smith is running for the 21st district state Senate seat.

District 24: Democratic incumbent Mike Slattery is retiring.

District 25: This is a new seat, with no current incumbent.

District 27: Republican incumbent Charlotte O'Hara unsuccessfully sought the 37th district state Senate seat.

District 28: Republican incumbent Pat Colloton unsuccessfully sought the 11th district state Senate seat.

District 29: This is a new seat, with no current incumbent.

District 38: Republican incumbent Anthony Brown is running for the 3rd district state Senate seat.

District 39: Republican incumbent Owen Donohoe is retiring.

District 40: This is a new seat, with no current incumbent.

District 51: This is a new seat, with no current incumbent.

District 52: This is a new seat, with no current incumbent.

District 56: This is a new seat, with no current incumbent.

District 57: This is a new seat, with no current incumbent.

District 59 (old District 10): Republican incumbent TerriLois Gregory was defeated in the primary.

District 65: Republican incumbent James Fawcett unsuccessfully sought the 17th district state Senate seat.

District 69: Republican incumbent Tom Arpke is running for the 24th district state Senate seat.

District 70: Republican incumbent J. Robert Brookens is retiring.

District 71: Republican incumbent Charles Roth is retiring.

District 75: Republican incumbent John Grange unsuccessfully sought the 14th district state Senate seat.

District 78: This is a new seat, with no current incumbent.

District 83: Republican incumbent Jo Ann Pottorff is retiring.

District 87: This is a new seat, with no current incumbent.

District 89: Democratic incumbent Melody McCray-Miller is retiring.

District 93: Republican incumbent Dan Kerschen is running for the 26th district state Senate seat.

District 96: This is a new seat, with no current incumbent.

District 100: This is a new seat, with no current incumbent.

District 104: Republican incumbent and Speaker of the House Michael O'Neal is retiring.

District 105: This is a new seat, with no current incumbent.

District 107: Republican incumbent Elaine Bowers is running for the 36th district state Senate seat.

District 109: This is a new seat, with no current incumbent.

District 110: Republican incumbent Dan Collins is retiring.

District 112: Republican incumbent Bill Wolf is retiring.

District 113: Republican incumbent Lorene Bethell, who took over the position following the death of her husband Bob Bethell, is not seeking a full term.

District 114: Republican incumbent Mitch Holmes is running for the 33rd district state Senate seat.

District 117: Republican incumbent Larry Powell is running for the 39th district state Senate seat.

District 122: Republican incumbent Gary Hayzlett is retiring.

District 123: Republican incumbent Reynaldo Mesa ended his bid for re-election, and was subsequently defeated in the primary (as his name still appeared on the ballot).

District 125: Republican incumbent Carl Holmes was defeated in the primary.

== State Board of Education ==
5 of the 10 members of the Kansas State Board of Education are up for election.

=== District 2 ===
Democratic incumbent Sue Storm, who has held the position since 2009, is retiring.

Former state Representative Cindy Neighbor sought and received the Democratic nomination to succeed Storm.

Steve Roberts, a middle school teacher from Overland Park, sought and received the Republican nomination.

General election results

Election results, Kansas Board of Education District 2, November 6, 2012
Party	Candidate	Votes	%
Democratic	Cindy Neighbor	67,947	47.4
Republican	Steve Roberts	75,297	52.5
Total votes		143,244	100
Republican gain from Democratic			

=== District 4 ===
Democratic incumbent Carolyn Campbell, who has held the position since 2009, is running for re-election.

Jack Wu sought and received the Republican nomination to challenge Campbell.

General election results

Election results, Kansas Board of Education District 4, November 6, 2012
Party	Candidate	Votes	%
Democratic	Carolyn Campbell (incumbent)	84,237	71.1
Republican	Jack Wu	34,074	28.8
Total votes		121,311	100
Democratic hold			

=== District 6 ===
Republican incumbent Kathy Martin, who has held the position since 2005, is retiring.

Former state Representative Deena Horst sought and received the Republican nomination to succeed Martin.

Carol Viar, a member of the Southeast of Saline School Board, sought and received the Democratic nomination. She defeated Usha Reddi, a first grade teacher from Manhattan, in the primary.
Primary results

Democratic primary results
Party	Candidate	Votes	%
Democratic	Carol Viar	3,907	53.3
Democratic	Usha Reddi	3,421	46.6
Total votes		7,328	100

General election results

Election results, Kansas Board of Education District 6, November 6, 2012
Party	Candidate	Votes	%
Republican	Deena Horst	66,778	62.6
Democratic	Carol Viar	39,837	37.3
Total votes		106,615	100
Republican hold			

=== District 8 ===
Republican incumbent Walt Chappell, who has held the position since 2009 (and had been a Democrat until 2011), was defeated in the primary by Kathy Busch, a former science teacher and assistant superintendent for the Wichita Public Schools.

No Democrats or Libertarians filed to run for the seat. Primary results

Republican primary results
Party	Candidate	Votes	%
Republican	Kathy Busch	9,466	61.1
Republican	Walt Chappell (incumbent)	6,009	38.8
Total votes		15,475	100

General election results

Election results, Kansas Board of Education District 8, November 6, 2012
Party	Candidate	Votes	%
Republican	Kathy Busch	49,337	100
Total votes		49,337	100
Republican hold			

=== District 10 ===
Republican incumbent and Board Chairman David Dennis, who has held the position since 2009, is retiring.

Jim McNiece, a former high school principal from Wichita, sought and received the Republican nomination to succeed Dennis.

No Democrats or Libertarians filed to run for the seat.

General election results

Election results, Kansas Board of Education District 10, November 6, 2012
Party	Candidate	Votes	%
Republican	Jim McNiece	82,620	100
Total votes		82,620	100
Republican hold			
