= 2004 Kansas Senate election =

- November 2, 2004

All 40 seats in the Kansas Senate 21 seats needed for a majority
	Majority party	Minority party
Leader	David Kerr (retired)	Anthony Hensley
Party	Republican	Democratic
Leader's seat	34th district	19th district
Seats won	30	10
Popular vote	689,995	404,420
Percentage	62.38%	36.55%
- Results by winning party vote share Republicans: 50–60% 60–70% 70–80% 90–100% Democrats: 40–50% 50–60% 60–70% 70–80% 90–100%
President of the Senate before election
David Kerr
Republican
Elected President of the Senate
Stephen Morris
Republican

Elections to the Kansas Senate were held on November 2, 2004, to elect 40 candidates to the Senate to serve a four-year term. The Republican Party won 30 seats to the Democrats' 10.

== District 1 ==
District 1 Democratic primary
Party	Candidate	Votes	%
Democratic	Tom Kautz	2,007	58.89%
Democratic	Galen Weiland	1,401	41.11%
Total votes		3,408	100.00%

District 1 Republican primary
Party	Candidate	Votes	%
Republican	Dennis D. Pyle	4,642	39.87%
Republican	Steve Lukert	3,381	29.04%
Republican	Trent LeDoux	2,683	23.04%
Republican	Richard S. Karnowski	937	8.05%
Total votes		11,643	100.00%

District 1 election
Party	Candidate	Votes	%
Republican	Dennis D. Pyle	15,865	54.64%
Democratic	Tom Kautz	13,173	45.36%
Total votes		29,038	100.00%

== District 2 ==
District 2 Democratic primary
Party	Candidate	Votes	%
Democratic	Marci Francisco	2,999	100.00%
Total votes		2,999	100.00%

District 2 Republican primary
Party	Candidate	Votes	%
Republican	Mark Buhler	3,221	63.03%
Republican	Don Johnson	1,889	36.97%
Total votes		5,110	100.00%

District 2 election
Party	Candidate	Votes	%
Democratic	Marci Francisco	16,478	50.83%
Republican	Mark Buhler	13,902	42.89%
Reform	James W. (Jim) Mullins	2,035	6.28%
Total votes		32,415	100.00%

== District 3 ==
District 3 Democratic primary
Party	Candidate	Votes	%
Democratic	Jan Justice	3,036	71.55%
Democratic	Edward (Ed) Sass	1,207	28.45%
Total votes		4,243	100.00%

District 3 Republican primary
Party	Candidate	Votes	%
Republican	Roger C. Pine	3,760	47.28%
Republican	Connie O'Brien	2,673	33.61%
Republican	Richard Rodewald	933	11.73%
Republican	Chuck Quinn	586	7.37%
Total votes		7,952	100.00%

District 3 election
Party	Candidate	Votes	%
Republican	Roger C. Pine	18,134	51.84%
Democratic	Jan Justice	16,849	48.16%
Total votes		34,983	100.00%

== District 4 ==
District 4 Democratic primary
Party	Candidate	Votes	%
Democratic	David Haley	5,140	100.00%
Total votes		5,140	100.00%

District 4 election
Party	Candidate	Votes	%
Democratic	David Haley	17,420	100.00%
Total votes		17,420	100.00%

== District 5 ==
District 5 Democratic primary
Party	Candidate	Votes	%
Democratic	Mark S. Gilstrap	4,313	100.00%
Total votes		4,313	100.00%

District 5 Republican primary
Party	Candidate	Votes	%
Republican	Steve Fitzgerald	2,194	44.27%
Republican	Joel D. Grodberg	1,583	31.94%
Republican	Donna M. McDaniel	1,179	23.79%
Total votes		4,956	100.00%

District 5 election
Party	Candidate	Votes	%
Democratic	Mark S. Gilstrap	13,257	51.58%
Republican	Steve Fitzgerald	12,443	48.42%
Total votes		25,700	100.00%

== District 6 ==
District 6 Democratic primary
Party	Candidate	Votes	%
Democratic	Chris Steineger	3,338	65.88%
Democratic	Stan S. Frownfelter	1,729	34.12%
Total votes		5,067	100.00%

District 6 election
Party	Candidate	Votes	%
Democratic	Chris Steineger	14,450	79.22%
Reform	Joy Holt	3,791	20.78%
Total votes		18,241	100.00%

== District 7 ==
District 7 Democratic primary
Party	Candidate	Votes	%
Democratic	Thurston Cromwell	3,109	100.00%
Total votes		3,109	100.00%

District 7 Republican primary
Party	Candidate	Votes	%
Republican	David Wysong	7,012	58.50%
Republican	Dwight Sutherland Jr.	4,974	41.50%
Total votes		11,986	100.00%

District 7 election
Party	Candidate	Votes	%
Republican	David Wysong	20,855	55.94%
Democratic	Thurston Cromwell	16,424	44.06%
Total votes		37,279	100.00%

== District 8 ==
District 8 Democratic primary
Party	Candidate	Votes	%
Democratic	Nate Hogan	2,511	100.00%
Total votes		2,511	100.00%

District 8 Republican primary
Party	Candidate	Votes	%
Republican	Barbara P. Allen	5,950	56.06%
Republican	Dan Schnieders	4,663	43.94%
Total votes		10,613	100.00%

District 8 election
Party	Candidate	Votes	%
Republican	Barbara P. Allen	19,494	60.23%
Democratic	Nate Hogan	11,046	34.13%
Reform	D. Eric West	1,827	5.64%
Total votes		32,367	100.00%

== District 9 ==
District 9 Democratic primary
Party	Candidate	Votes	%
Democratic	Mike Boatright	2,314	100.00%
Total votes		2,314	100.00%

District 9 Republican primary
Party	Candidate	Votes	%
Republican	Kay O'Connor	5,764	53.54%
Republican	Rob Boyer	5,002	46.46%
Total votes		10,766	100.00%

District 9 election
Party	Candidate	Votes	%
Republican	Kay O'Connor	19,786	60.12%
Democratic	Mike Boatright	13,124	39.88%
Total votes		32,910	100.00%

== District 10 ==
District 10 Democratic primary
Party	Candidate	Votes	%
Democratic	Pete Roman	2,968	100.00%
Total votes		2,968	100.00%

District 10 Republican primary
Party	Candidate	Votes	%
Republican	Nick Jordan	6,656	57.98%
Republican	Lisa L. Benlon	4,823	42.02%
Total votes		11,479	100.00%

District 10 election
Party	Candidate	Votes	%
Republican	Nick Jordan	21,687	61.06%
Democratic	Pete Roman	13,833	38.94%
Total votes		35,520	100.00%

== District 11 ==
District 11 Republican primary
Party	Candidate	Votes	%
Republican	John L. Vratil	6,779	56.20%
Republican	David G. Belpedio	5,284	43.80%
Total votes		12,063	100.00%

District 11 election
Party	Candidate	Votes	%
Republican	John L. Vratil	29,762	100.00%
Total votes		29,762	100.00%

== District 12 ==
District 12 Democratic primary
Party	Candidate	Votes	%
Democratic	Tim Shields	2,302	64.16%
Democratic	Cal Lantis	1,286	35.84%
Total votes		3,588	100.00%

District 12 Republican primary
Party	Candidate	Votes	%
Republican	Pat Apple	4,794	47.33%
Republican	Caryn Tyson	3,925	38.75%
Republican	Tom Little	772	7.62%
Republican	Scott J. Barnhart	637	6.29%
Total votes		10,128	100.00%

District 12 election
Party	Candidate	Votes	%
Republican	Pat Apple	19,815	64.61%
Democratic	Tim Shields	9,379	30.58%
Libertarian	Tim Ralston	1,474	4.81%
Total votes		30,668	100.00%

== District 13 ==
District 13 Democratic primary
Party	Candidate	Votes	%
Democratic	Jim Barone	6,757	100.00%
Total votes		6,757	100.00%

District 13 Republican primary
Party	Candidate	Votes	%
Republican	Lynda Wilkinson	3,612	100.00%
Total votes		3,612	100.00%

District 13 election
Party	Candidate	Votes	%
Democratic	Jim Barone	13,948	49.79%
Republican	Lynda Wilkinson	13,634	48.67%
Libertarian	Larry Monaghan	432	1.54%
Total votes		28,014	100.00%

== District 14 ==
District 14 Democratic primary
Party	Candidate	Votes	%
Democratic	Dusty Deringer	3,675	100.00%
Total votes		3,675	100.00%

District 14 Republican primary
Party	Candidate	Votes	%
Republican	Dwayne Umbarger	6,150	100.00%
Total votes		6,150	100.00%

District 14 election
Party	Candidate	Votes	%
Republican	Dwayne Umbarger	17,009	64.92%
Democratic	Dusty Deringer	9,190	35.08%
Total votes		26,199	100.00%

== District 15 ==
District 15 Republican primary
Party	Candidate	Votes	%
Republican	Derek Schmidt	12,050	100.00%
Total votes		12,050	100.00%

District 15 election
Party	Candidate	Votes	%
Republican	Derek Schmidt	24,307	100.00%
Total votes		24,307	100.00%

== District 16 ==
District 16 Democratic primary
Party	Candidate	Votes	%
Democratic	Belinda Aldrich-Farrar	1,874	100.00%
Total votes		1,874	100.00%

District 16 Republican primary
Party	Candidate	Votes	%
Republican	Peggy Palmer	4,875	61.45%
Republican	David R. Corbin	3,058	38.55%
Total votes		7,933	100.00%

District 16 election
Party	Candidate	Votes	%
Republican	Peggy Palmer	19,104	69.89%
Democratic	Belinda Aldrich-Farrar	8,230	30.11%
Total votes		27,334	100.00%

== District 17 ==
District 17 Democratic primary
Party	Candidate	Votes	%
Democratic	Sharon Karr	2,157	100.00%
Total votes		2,157	100.00%

District 17 Republican primary
Party	Candidate	Votes	%
Republican	Jim Barnett	5,889	69.76%
Republican	James Dean Meier	2,553	30.24%
Total votes		8,442	100.00%

District 17 election
Party	Candidate	Votes	%
Republican	Jim Barnett	16,739	62.06%
Democratic	Sharon Karr	10,234	37.94%
Total votes		26,973	100.00%

== District 18 ==
District 18 Democratic primary
Party	Candidate	Votes	%
Democratic	Laura Kelly	4,559	71.77%
Democratic	D. Kent Hurn	1,793	28.23%
Total votes		6,352	100.00%

District 18 Republican primary
Party	Candidate	Votes	%
Republican	Dave Jackson	7,345	100.00%
Total votes		7,345	100.00%

District 18 election
Party	Candidate	Votes	%
Democratic	Laura Kelly	15,388	50.16%
Republican	Dave Jackson	15,290	49.84%
Total votes		30,678	100.00%

== District 19 ==
District 19 Democratic primary
Party	Candidate	Votes	%
Democratic	Anthony Hensley	5,059	100.00%
Total votes		5,059	100.00%

District 19 Republican primary
Party	Candidate	Votes	%
Republican	Bob Hanson	3,014	50.87%
Republican	Douglas W. Desch	1,959	33.06%
Republican	Lowell D. Ramsey	952	16.07%
Total votes		5,925	100.00%

District 19 election
Party	Candidate	Votes	%
Democratic	Anthony Hensley	16,009	60.86%
Republican	Bob Hanson	10,297	39.14%
Total votes		26,306	100.00%

== District 20 ==
District 20 Democratic primary
Party	Candidate	Votes	%
Democratic	David Wilson	4,351	100.00%
Total votes		4,351	100.00%

District 20 Republican primary
Party	Candidate	Votes	%
Republican	Vicki Schmidt	3,795	33.37%
Republican	Ron Stryker	3,690	32.45%
Republican	Joe Patton	3,542	31.14%
Republican	Nick Nussbaum	346	3.04%
Total votes		11,373	100.00%

District 20 election
Party	Candidate	Votes	%
Republican	Vicki Schmidt	20,448	63.24%
Democratic	David Wilson	11,886	36.76%
Total votes		32,334	100.00%

== District 21 ==
District 21 Republican primary
Party	Candidate	Votes	%
Republican	Mark Taddiken	10,384	100.00%
Total votes		10,384	100.00%

District 21 election
Party	Candidate	Votes	%
Republican	Mark Taddiken	25,745	100.00%
Total votes		25,745	100.00%

== District 22 ==
District 22 Democratic primary
Party	Candidate	Votes	%
Democratic	Julie Govert Walter	1,164	51.23%
Democratic	Kate Watson	1,108	48.77%
Total votes		2,272	100.00%

District 22 Republican primary
Party	Candidate	Votes	%
Republican	Roger P. Reitz	3,291	50.58%
Republican	Bob Reader	2,625	40.35%
Republican	Kay Blanken	590	9.07%
Total votes		6,506	100.00%

District 22 election
Party	Candidate	Votes	%
Republican	Roger P. Reitz	14,448	62.02%
Democratic	Julie Govert Walter	8,848	37.98%
Total votes		23,296	100.00%

== District 23 ==
District 23 Republican primary
Party	Candidate	Votes	%
Republican	Karin Brownlee	8,450	82.62%
Republican	Marc A. Hurt	1,777	17.38%
Total votes		10,227	100.00%

District 23 election
Party	Candidate	Votes	%
Republican	Karin Brownlee	29,075	100.00%
Total votes		29,075	100.00%

== District 24 ==
District 24 Democratic primary
Party	Candidate	Votes	%
Democratic	Alan Jilka	2,111	100.00%
Total votes		2,111	100.00%

District 24 Republican primary
Party	Candidate	Votes	%
Republican	Pete Brungardt	8,004	100.00%
Total votes		8,004	100.00%

District 24 election
Party	Candidate	Votes	%
Republican	Pete Brungardt	17,565	59.42%
Democratic	Alan Jilka	11,994	40.58%
Total votes		29,559	100.00%

== District 25 ==
District 25 Democratic primary
Party	Candidate	Votes	%
Democratic	Hibbard Davis	1,430	100.00%
Total votes		1,430	100.00%

District 25 Republican primary
Party	Candidate	Votes	%
Republican	Jean Kurtis Schodorf	3,267	100.00%
Total votes		3,267	100.00%

District 25 election
Party	Candidate	Votes	%
Republican	Jean Kurtis Schodorf	15,478	66.45%
Democratic	Hibbard Davis	7,814	33.55%
Total votes		23,292	100.00%

== District 26 ==
District 26 Democratic primary
Party	Candidate	Votes	%
Democratic	Daniel J. Thimesch	1,271	100.00%
Total votes		1,271	100.00%

District 26 Republican primary
Party	Candidate	Votes	%
Republican	Phillip B. Journey	3,393	100.00%
Total votes		3,393	100.00%

District 26 election
Party	Candidate	Votes	%
Republican	Phillip B. Journey	16,472	57.99%
Democratic	Daniel J. Thimesch	11,931	42.01%
Total votes		28,403	100.00%

== District 27 ==
District 27 Democratic primary
Party	Candidate	Votes	%
Democratic	Barbara Jane Firestone	1,324	100.00%
Total votes		1,324	100.00%

District 27 Republican primary
Party	Candidate	Votes	%
Republican	Leslie D. Donovan Sr.	4,963	100.00%
Total votes		4,963	100.00%

District 27 election
Party	Candidate	Votes	%
Republican	Leslie D. Donovan Sr.	19,215	64.28%
Democratic	Barbara Jane Firestone	10,676	35.72%
Total votes		29,891	100.00%

== District 28 ==
District 28 Democratic primary
Party	Candidate	Votes	%
Democratic	Henry Helgerson	1,017	100.00%
Total votes		1,017	100.00%

District 28 Republican primary
Party	Candidate	Votes	%
Republican	Mike Petersen	870	41.02%
Republican	Mark S. Gietzen	818	38.57%
Republican	Tammy Baker	433	20.41%
Total votes		2,121	100.00%

District 28 election
Party	Candidate	Votes	%
Republican	Mike Petersen	9,568	57.66%
Democratic	Henry Helgerson	7,025	42.34%
Total votes		16,593	100.00%

== District 29 ==
District 29 Democratic primary
Party	Candidate	Votes	%
Democratic	Donald Betts Jr.	1,951	100.00%
Total votes		1,951	100.00%

District 29 Republican primary
Party	Candidate	Votes	%
Republican	Treatha Brown - Foster	998	100.00%
Total votes		998	100.00%

District 29 election
Party	Candidate	Votes	%
Democratic	Donald Betts Jr.	11,584	70.19%
Republican	Treatha Brown - Foster	4,919	29.81%
Total votes		16,503	100.00%

== District 30 ==
District 30 Democratic primary
Party	Candidate	Votes	%
Democratic	David E. Clark Jr.	1,415	100.00%
Total votes		1,415	100.00%

District 30 Republican primary
Party	Candidate	Votes	%
Republican	Susan Wagle	5,624	64.17%
Republican	Bob Knight	3,140	35.83%
Total votes		8,764	100.00%

District 30 election
Party	Candidate	Votes	%
Republican	Susan Wagle	18,771	59.93%
Democratic	David E. Clark Jr.	11,727	37.44%
Libertarian	Donald L. Harter	825	2.63%
Total votes		31,323	100.00%

== District 31 ==
District 31 Democratic primary
Party	Candidate	Votes	%
Democratic	Randy Brown	1,569	100.00%
Total votes		1,569	100.00%

District 31 Republican primary
Party	Candidate	Votes	%
Republican	Carolyn McGinn	4,916	100.00%
Total votes		4,916	100.00%

District 31 election
Party	Candidate	Votes	%
Republican	Carolyn McGinn	19,435	63.61%
Democratic	Randy Brown	11,118	36.39%
Total votes		30,553	100.00%

== District 32 ==
District 32 Democratic primary
Party	Candidate	Votes	%
Democratic	Greta Goodwin	2,935	100.00%
Total votes		2,935	100.00%

District 32 Republican primary
Party	Candidate	Votes	%
Republican	Ray La Boeuf	4,852	100.00%
Total votes		4,852	100.00%

District 32 election
Party	Candidate	Votes	%
Democratic	Greta Goodwin	13,200	48.70%
Republican	Ray La Boeuf	12,980	47.89%
Libertarian	James Reed Robbins	925	3.41%
Total votes		27,105	100.00%

== District 33 ==
District 33 Republican primary
Party	Candidate	Votes	%
Republican	Ruth Teichman	7,630	58.04%
Republican	Russell D. Steen	5,516	41.96%
Total votes		13,146	100.00%

District 33 election
Party	Candidate	Votes	%
Republican	Ruth Teichman	24,719	100.00%
Total votes		24,719	100.00%

== District 34 ==
District 34 Democratic primary
Party	Candidate	Votes	%
Democratic	L. Duane Anstine	2,024	55.77%
Democratic	James M. French	1,605	44.23%
Total votes		3,629	100.00%

District 34 Republican primary
Party	Candidate	Votes	%
Republican	Terry Bruce	4,098	53.10%
Republican	Robin Jackson	3,619	46.90%
Total votes		7,717	100.00%

District 34 election
Party	Candidate	Votes	%
Republican	Terry Bruce	15,557	59.02%
Democratic	L. Duane Anstine	10,803	40.98%
Total votes		26,360	100.00%

== District 35 ==
District 35 Democratic primary
Party	Candidate	Votes	%
Democratic	Chris Snyder	1,730	100.00%
Total votes		1,730	100.00%

District 35 Republican primary
Party	Candidate	Votes	%
Republican	Jay Emler	7,621	100.00%
Total votes		7,621	100.00%

District 35 election
Party	Candidate	Votes	%
Republican	Jay Emler	20,894	72.39%
Democratic	Chris Snyder	7,968	27.61%
Total votes		28,862	100.00%

== District 36 ==
District 36 Democratic primary
Party	Candidate	Votes	%
Democratic	Janis K. Lee	3,464	100.00%
Total votes		3,464	100.00%

District 36 Republican primary
Party	Candidate	Votes	%
Republican	Larry D. Salmans	9,503	100.00%
Total votes		9,503	100.00%

District 36 election
Party	Candidate	Votes	%
Democratic	Janis K. Lee	18,380	56.28%
Republican	Larry D. Salmans	13,477	41.26%
Libertarian	Bill Earnest	804	2.46%
Total votes		32,661	100.00%

== District 37 ==
District 37 Democratic primary
Party	Candidate	Votes	%
Democratic	Rick Turnbow	1,487	100.00%
Total votes		1,487	100.00%

District 37 Republican primary
Party	Candidate	Votes	%
Republican	Dennis M Wilson	9,019	100.00%
Total votes		9,019	100.00%

District 37 election
Party	Candidate	Votes	%
Republican	Dennis M Wilson	26,295	71.00%
Democratic	Rick Turnbow	10,742	29.00%
Total votes		37,037	100.00%

== District 38 ==
District 38 Republican primary
Party	Candidate	Votes	%
Republican	Tim Huelskamp	5,285	72.30%
Republican	Chris Jewell	2,025	27.70%
Total votes		7,310	100.00%

District 38 election
Party	Candidate	Votes	%
Republican	Tim Huelskamp	17,183	100.00%
Total votes		17,183	100.00%

== District 39 ==
District 39 Republican primary
Party	Candidate	Votes	%
Republican	Stephen R. Morris	7,471	100.00%
Total votes		7,471	100.00%

District 39 election
Party	Candidate	Votes	%
Republican	Stephen R. Morris	18,423	100.00%
Total votes		18,423	100.00%

== District 40 ==
District 40 Democratic primary
Party	Candidate	Votes	%
Democratic	Tim Peterson	2,231	100.00%
Total votes		2,231	100.00%

District 40 Republican primary
Party	Candidate	Votes	%
Republican	Ralph Ostmeyer	8,630	53.65%
Republican	Dan Rasure	7,455	46.35%
Total votes		16,085	100.00%

District 40 election
Party	Candidate	Votes	%
Republican	Ralph Ostmeyer	21,205	67.32%
Democratic	Tim Peterson	10,292	32.68%
Total votes		31,497	100.00%
