= Theodore D. Saar =

American politician (1918–1981)

Ted Saar

Member of the Kansas Senate from the 13th district
- In office 1973–1976
- Succeeded by: Donald L. Allegrucci

Member of the Kansas Senate from the 8th district
- In office 1969–1972
- Succeeded by: Jan Meyers

Member of the Kansas Senate from the 1st district
- In office 1965–1968

Member of the Kansas Senate from the 9th district
- In office 1963–1964
- Preceded by: F.O. Doty

Personal details
- Born: April 25, 1918 Chanute, Kansas
- Died: October 22, 1981
- Party: Democratic

Theodore D. "Ted" Saar Jr. (April 25, 1918 – October 22, 1981) was an American politician who served as a Democrat in the Kansas State Senate from 1963 to 1976.

Saar was born in Chanute, Kansas and worked as a railroad engineer. He was originally appointed to the Kansas Senate in 1963, to fill the unexpired term of F.O. Doty, who resigned the 9th district seat. He was re-elected in his own right in 1964 (switching districts to the 1st), switched districts again in 1968 to run in the 8th, and finally served for one term in the 13th Senate district.
