= Lillian Papay =

American politician (1922–2008)

Member of the Kansas Senate from the 33rd district
- In office 1993–1996
- Preceded by: Fred Kerr
- Succeeded by: Laurie Bleeker

Personal details
- Born: Lillian Steincamp; June 24, 1922 Ripley, Oklahoma
- Died: November 23, 2008 Dimmitt, Texas
- Party: Republican
- Spouse: Emit Papay (m. 1940; died July 18, 1998)
- Children: 1

Lillian Delia Papay (June 24, 1922–November 23, 2008) was an American businesswoman and politician who served one term in the Kansas State Senate.

Lillian Steincamp grew up in Oklahoma and married Emit Papay in 1940. During World War II, she worked as an operator in the U.S. Army Signal Corps, and after the war became a telephone operator. She and her husband were co-owners of a transportation firm in Great Bend, Kansas.

Papay entered politics late in life, serving as the Republican chair for Barton County, Kansas and as a co-chair for Bob Dole's campaign for president. In 1992, Papay was elected to the state senate from the 33rd district following the retirement of Fred Kerr. She served for one term in the Senate, and was succeeded by Laurie Bleeker. After her time in the state senate, she became mayor of Great Bend from 1997 to 1999. Papay moved to Texas after her service as mayor to be cared for by her daughter; her husband had died in 1998.
