= Fred Kerr =

American politician

Member of the Kansas Senate from the 33rd district
- In office 1977–1992
- Preceded by: Dick Williams
- Succeeded by: Lillian Papay

Personal details
- Born: December 29, 1940 (age 85) Spearville, Kansas
- Party: Republican
- Spouse: Nancy Kerr
- Relations: David Kerr (brother)
- Children: 2
- Education: Oklahoma State University

Fred A. Kerr (born December 29, 1940) is an American former politician who served in the Kansas State Senate from 1977 to 1992.

Kerr was born in Spearville, Kansas as a third-generation farmer and rancher. He attended Oklahoma State University and was involved in civic affairs in Pratt County before being elected to the Senate.

Kerr was elected to the Senate in 1976, defeating Kansas State House member Walter Graber by a narrow margin. During his time in the Senate, Kerr chaired the taxation committee and the agriculture committee. He retired from the Senate in 1992, and in 1994 ran for governor; he finished in third place in a six-way race in the Republican primary, losing to eventual governor Bill Graves. Graves nominated Kerr to the Kansas Board of Regents in 1999.
