= Phillip W. Martin =

American politician (born 1948)

Member of the Kansas Senate from the 13th district
- In office 1985–1996
- Preceded by: Edward Roitz
- Succeeded by: Jim Barone

Personal details
- Born: January 24, 1948 (age 78) Pittsburg, Kansas
- Party: Democratic

Phillip W. Martin (born January 24, 1948) is an American former politician who served in the Kansas State Senate from 1985 to 1996. He was succeeded by Jim Barone.
