= Senator Chaney =

Senator Chaney may refer to:

- Bert Chaney (1928–2024), Kentucky State Senate
- John Chaney (Ohio politician) (1790–1881), Ohio State Senate
- Mike Chaney (born 1944), Mississippi State Senate

== See also ==
- Senator Cheney (disambiguation)
