= Mastroni =

Mastroni is a surname. Notable people with the surname include:

- Andrea Mastroni, Italian bass
- Leonard Mastroni (1949–2020), American politician and judge
