= Rardin =

Rardin is a surname. Notable people with the surname include:

- Gene Rardin, American politician
- Amy Rardin, American screenwriter
- Jennifer Rardin (1965–2010), American urban fantasy author
- Marc Rardin (born 1971/1972), American baseball coach and former player
- Pearl Rardin (1886–1968), American college football coach and World War I veteran

== See also ==
- Rardin, Illinois
