= Mark Treaster =

American politician

Member of the Kansas House of Representatives from the 101st district
- In office January 10, 2005 – January 12, 2009
- Preceded by: Mary Kauffman
- Succeeded by: Joe Seiwert

Personal details
- Born: May 17, 1954 (age 72)
- Party: Democratic
- Spouse: Mary
- Children: 2
- Education: Emporia State University

Mark R. Treaster (May 17, 1954) is a Democratic Party former member of the Kansas House of Representatives and businessman. He served the Kansas 101st district from 2005-2009. In 2012, he ran for the 34th district of the Kansas Senate, but lost in the general election to incumbent Terry Bruce. While in the state house, he served on the House Transportation Committee.

Before entering politics and business, Treaster was an educator in Pretty Prairie, Kansas and Concordia, Kansas. He earned a Bachelor of Science in Secondary Education in 1977 and a Master of Science in Learning Disabilities in 1991, both from Emporia State University.

In 2010, he was named to the USDA Farm Service Agency state committee in Kansas and still holds the position as of January 2016.
