= Donald Allegrucci =

American judge (1936–2014)

Justice of the Kansas Supreme Court
- In office 1986–2007

Member of the Kansas Senate from the 13th district
- In office January 10, 1977 – January 12, 1981
- Preceded by: Theodore D. Saar
- Succeeded by: Edward Roitz

Personal details
- Born: Donald Lee Allegrucci; September 19, 1936 Pittsburg, Kansas, U.S.
- Died: November 8, 2014 (aged 78) Topeka, Kansas, U.S.
- Party: Democratic
- Spouse: Joyce Thompson (after 1963)
- Children: 2
- Education: Pittsburg State University; Washburn Law School

Donald Lee Allegrucci (September 19, 1936 – November 8, 2014) was an American politician and jurist.

Born in Pittsburg, Kansas, Allegrucci served in the United States Air Force Reserve. He received in bachelor's degree from Pittsburg State University and his law degree from Washburn Law School. Allegrucci served as assistant district attorney for Crawford County, Kansas. From 1976 to 1980, Allegrucci served in the Kansas State Senate as a Democrat. In 1978, Allegrucci ran for the United States House of Representatives. From 1982 to 1986, Allegrucci served as Kansas District Court judge. Allegrucci served on the Kansas Supreme Court from 1986 until 2007. He died of cancer in Topeka, Kansas, aged 78.
