= Senator Denning =

Senator Denning may refer to:

- Jim Denning (born 1956), Kansas State Senate
- William Denning (1740–1819), New York State Senate
