= Jim Barone =

American politician (born 1941)

Member of the Kansas Senate from the 13th district
- In office January 13, 1997 – January 1, 2009
- Preceded by: Phillip W. Martin
- Succeeded by: Bob Marshall

Personal details
- Born: May 20, 1941 (age 85) Chicago, Illinois, U.S.
- Party: Democratic
- Spouse: Donita
- Children: 3
- Education: Pittsburg State University

James L. Barone (born May 20, 1941) is a former Democratic member of the Kansas Senate, representing the 13th District.

Barone was originally elected to the Senate in the 1996 elections. He was one of two Democratic Senators to get campaign contributions from the Koch brothers. He was accused of sexual harassment of young interns and multiple abuses of power, removed from positions of leadership by his minority caucus, and defeated in the 2008 primary.
