= Thimesch =

Thimesch is a surname. Notable people with the surname include:

- Jack Thimesch (born 1960), American politician
- Kronda Thimesch, American politician
