= Edward Roitz =

American politician (born 1955)

Member of the Kansas Senate from the 13th district
- In office 1981–1984
- Preceded by: Donald L. Allegrucci
- Succeeded by: Phillip W. Martin

Personal details
- Born: March 18, 1955 (age 71)
- Party: Republican
- Spouse: Bethann Roitz
- Children: 4

Edward J. Roitz (born March 18, 1955) is an American politician who served in the Kansas State Senate as a Republican from 1981 to 1984.

Roitz owned and operated a number of convenience stores and gas stations that were controlled by his family business. He was originally elected to the State Senate in 1980 and served for one term; he left office after the 1984 legislative session and was replaced by Democrat Phillip W. Martin. In addition to his time in the Kansas Senate, Roitz served as mayor and city councillor.

In 2022, he attempted a return to the state legislature, running for the Kansas House of Representatives in District 16. He faced no opposition in the primary, but was defeated in the general election by incumbent Democrat Linda Featherston.
