= Barbara Allen (politician) =

American politician (born 1961)

Member of the Kansas Senate from the 8th district
- In office January 8, 2001 – January 12, 2009
- Preceded by: Richard Bond
- Succeeded by: Tim Owens

Member of the Kansas House of Representatives from the 21st district
- In office 1988 – January 8, 2001
- Preceded by: Ron Fox
- Succeeded by: Dean Newton

Personal details
- Born: February 8, 1961 (age 65)
- Party: Republican
- Education: Mount Vernon College for Women; University of Missouri–Kansas City School of Law

Barbara Allen (born February 8, 1961) is a Republican, Kansas state senator from the 8th District. She is from Overland Park, Kansas, and is an attorney. Allen graduated with a Bachelor of Science from Mount Vernon College for Women (now the George Washington University Mount Vernon campus) and a degree from the University of Missouri–Kansas City Law School. She was first appointed to the Kansas House of Representatives to fill the remainder of the term of Ron Fox, who resigned in 1987, and won re-election in her own right for an additional six terms. In the 2000 election, she won a seat in the Kansas Senate, where she served for two terms.

In March 2005, Allen was informed that she had breast cancer. Unable to be treated in Kansas, Allen sought treatment at the Dana–Farber Cancer Institute in Boston. After 12 rounds of chemotherapy, 33 radiation treatments, and surgery, doctors said that they could not detect any cancer.

She is a patron of the Kansas Children's Cabinet.

== Personal life ==
Allen is a native of Overland Park, Kansas. She married Kevin Moriarty in November 2011.

== Political experience ==
- Senator, Kansas State Senate, 2001–2008
- Representative, Kansas State House, 1989–2001
- Assistant Attorney General, 1985–1987
