= Dolores Furtado =

American politician

Member of the Kansas House of Representatives from the 19th district
- In office January 12, 2009 – January 10, 2011
- Preceded by: Tim Owens
- Succeeded by: Jim Denning

Personal details
- Born: July 4, 1938 (age 88)
- Party: Democratic
- Education: University of Michigan

Dolores Furtado (July 4, 1938) is a former Democratic member of the Kansas House of Representatives, who represented the 19th district. She served from 2009 to 2011. Furtado ran for re-election in 2010, but was defeated by Republican Jim Denning.

Prior to her election, Furtado served as County Commissioner from 2003 to 2007 on the Johnson County Board of County Commissioners. Since 2007 she served on the Boards of the TriCounty Smart Start, Kansas Health Solutions, CASA of Johnson and Wyandotte Counties, Johnson County Nursing Center, Public Health Partners and Aging Information. Furtado served as the president of the League of Women Voters (LWV) during the period that when Kansas Secretary of State Kris Kobach tried to increase restrictions of voting rights. The LWV, the Kansas American Civil Liberties Union (ACLU), and the intervenor Brennan Center for Justice prevailed in the case. Kobach claimed the organizations were "communists."

She received her Bachelor's in Bacteriology from Cornell University and her Master's and PhD in Microbiology from the University of Michigan.

== Committee membership ==
- Health and Human Services
- Aging and Long Term Care
- Economic Development and Tourism
- Joint Committee on Arts and Cultural Resources

== Major donors ==
The top 5 donors to Furtado's 2008 campaign:

- 1. Kansas Democratic Party $19,250
- 2. Foreman, Brian $500
- 3. United Transportation Union $500
- 4. Leiter, David J. $500
- 5. Kansas National Education Assoc. $500
