= Senator Hayden (disambiguation) =

Carl Hayden (1877–1972) was a U.S. Senator from Arizona from 1927 to 1969. Senator Hayden may also refer to:

- Cedric Ross Hayden (fl. 2010s–present)
- Jeff Hayden (born 1966), Minnesota State Senate
- Leroy Hayden (1927–2008), Kansas State Senate
- Moses Hayden (1786–1830), New York State Senate
- Salter Hayden (1896–1987), Senate of Canada
- Tom Hayden (1939–2016), California State Senate
