= Jan Meyers =

American politician (1928–2019)

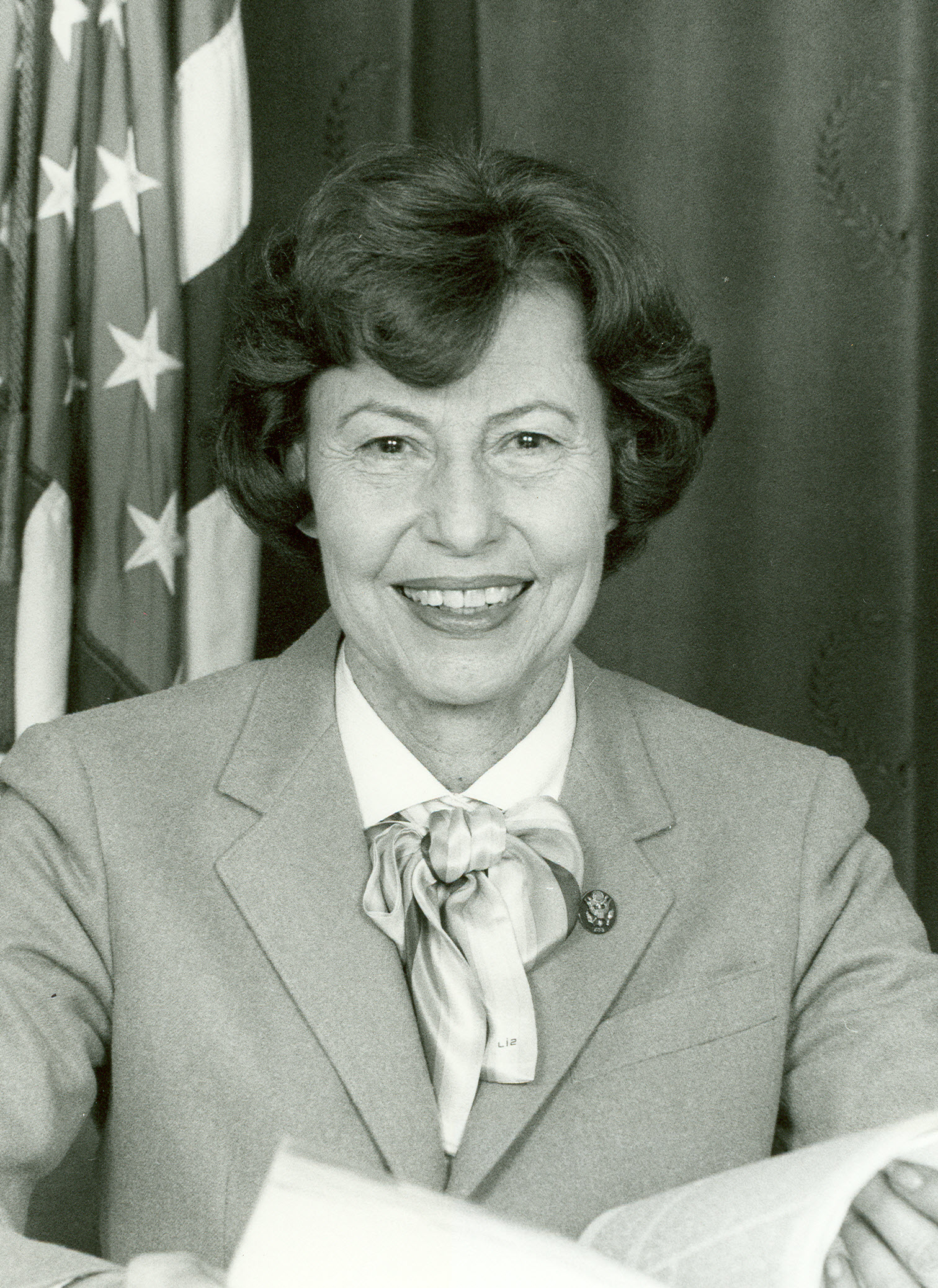

Chair of the House Small Business Committee
- In office January 3, 1995 – January 3, 1997
- Preceded by: John LaFalce
- Succeeded by: Jim Talent

Member of the U.S. House of Representatives from Kansas's 3rd district
- In office January 3, 1985 – January 3, 1997
- Preceded by: Larry Winn
- Succeeded by: Vince Snowbarger

Member of the Kansas Senate from the 8th district
- In office 1973–1984
- Preceded by: Theodore D. Saar
- Succeeded by: Jack D. Walker

Personal details
- Born: Janice Lenore Crilly; July 20, 1928 Lincoln, Nebraska, U.S.
- Died: June 21, 2019 (aged 90) Merriam, Kansas, U.S.
- Party: Republican
- Spouse: Dutch Myers
- Children: 2
- Education: William Woods University (attended); University of Nebraska (BA)

Janice Lenore Meyers (née Crilly; July 20, 1928 – June 21, 2019) was an American Republican party politician and a member of the United States House of Representatives from Kansas.

== Biography ==
Meyers was born on July 20, 1928, in Lincoln, Nebraska. She attended public schools in Superior, Nebraska, and attended William Woods College in Fulton, Missouri. She graduated with a Bachelor of Arts degree from the University of Nebraska in 1951. From 1951 until 1954, she worked as an advertising and public relations assistant for a radio station in Omaha and a department store in Lincoln, Nebraska. From 1967 to 1972, she was a city councilwoman in Overland Park, Kansas. From 1972 until 1984, she was a member of the Kansas Senate. In 1978, she ran for the United States Senate, but was defeated in a multi-candidate Republican primary which was won by Nancy Kassebaum.

In 1984, she defeated Jack Reardon in the election as a member of the 99th United States Congress and to the five succeeding Congresses, where she served as a Republican from January 3, 1985, to January 3, 1997. During the 104th United States Congress, she was the chairwoman of the United States House Committee on Small Business. She was not a candidate for re-election to the 105th United States Congress. She was the first Republican woman elected to the U.S. House from Kansas. Her son, Phil Meyers, ran for a congressional seat in Hawaii in 2000 as a Republican against Rep. Neil Abercrombie, but was defeated.

Meyers died from heart disease on June 21, 2019, aged 90, at a hospital in Merriam, Kansas.

== See also ==
- Women in the United States House of Representatives

U.S. House of Representatives
Preceded by Larry Winn	Member of the U.S. House of Representatives from Kansas's 3rd congressional district 1985–1997	Succeeded by Vince Snowbarger
Preceded by Andy Ireland	Ranking Member of the House Small Business Committee; 1993–1995	Succeeded by John LaFalce
Preceded by John LaFalce	Chair of the House Small Business Committee; 1995–1997	Succeeded by Jim Talent
