= Edward Berger (disambiguation) =

Edward Berger (born 1970) is a German-born director and screenwriter.

Edward Berger may also refer to:

- Ed Berger (1949–2017), American librarian, discographer, author, editor, historian, photographer, educator, jazz producer, and record label owner
- Ed Berger (politician) (born 1945), American politician

== See also ==
- Edward Burger (born 1964), American mathematician
