= Usha Reddi =

American politician

Member of the Kansas Senate from the 22nd district
- In office January 11, 2023 – January 13, 2025
- Preceded by: Tom Hawk
- Succeeded by: Brad Starnes

Personal details
- Born: Usha Reddi; 1965 (age 60–61) Rajahmundry, India
- Party: Democratic
- Spouse: Brian Niehoff
- Children: 3
- Education: Ohio State University; Kansas State University
- Profession: Educator (retired)

Usha L. Reddi (born 1965) is an American politician and educator who served as a Democratic member of the Kansas Senate for the 22nd district. She has also served as a city commissioner and mayor for the city of Manhattan, Kansas from 2013 to 2023.

== Career ==
=== Education ===
Reddi was a long-time educator in Manhattan–Ogden public schools, where she served a term as President of the National Education Association chapter. In 2012, she unsuccessfully ran for the Kansas State Board of Education in District 6, placing second in the Democratic primary election behind Carol Viar.

=== Manhattan City Commission ===
In 2013, Reddi ran for the Manhattan city commission, coming in second place after Karen McCulloh with 17.47% of the vote.

=== 2020 U.S. Senate campaign ===
In 2020, Reddi announced her campaign for the Democratic nomination for the U.S. Senate, but withdrew before the primary election.

=== Kansas Senate ===
Following Senator Tom Hawk's resignation, Reddi was elected to the Kansas Senate by the Democratic precinct chairs in the district. She was chosen over Riley County Democratic Party Chair Katie Allen by a vote of 23 to 19. She lost the 2024 election for the seat to Republican Brad Starnes.

== Personal life ==
Reddi holds two bachelor's degrees, one in developmental psychology from the Ohio State University and the other in elementary education from Kansas State University. She also holds a master's degree in educational leadership from Kansas State University. She immigrated to the U.S. in 1973 and moved to Manhattan in 1992. She is of Telugu descent.

== See also ==
- List of mayors of Manhattan, Kansas
