= Senator Berger =

Senator Berger may refer to:

- Charles W. Berger (born 1936), Kentucky State Senate
- David Berger (Wisconsin politician) (born 1946), Wisconsin State Senate
- Doug Berger (fl. 1960s–2010s), North Carolina State Senate
- Ed Berger (politician) (born 1945), Kansas State Senate
- James S. Berger (1903–1984), Pennsylvania State Senate
- Phil Berger (politician) (born 1952), North Carolina State Senate
