= Cindy Holscher =

Governor-elect of Kansas (born 1969)

- Holscher in 2026

Governor-elect of Kansas
- Assuming office January 11, 2027
- Lieutenant: KC Ohaebosim (elect)
- Succeeding: Laura Kelly

Member of the Kansas Senate from the 8th district
- Incumbent
- Assumed office January 11, 2021
- Preceded by: Jim Denning

Member of the Kansas House of Representatives from the 16th district
- In office January 9, 2017 – January 11, 2021
- Preceded by: Amanda Grosserode
- Succeeded by: Linda Featherston

Personal details
- Born: Cynthia Blumhorst; April 26, 1969 (age 57) Slater, Missouri, U.S.
- Party: Democratic
- Spouse: Greg Holscher (m. 1992)
- Children: 3
- Education: University of Missouri (BA)
- Website: State Senate website Campaign website

Cynthia L. Holscher (née Blumhorst, born April 26, 1969) is an American politician who is the governor-elect of Kansas. A member of the Democratic Party, Holscher has served since 2021 as a member of the Kansas Senate from the 8th district and served from 2017 to 2021 as a member of the Kansas House of Representatives from the 16th district.

== Early life and education ==
Holscher was raised on a farm near Slater, Missouri. She said, "I was ... riding a tractor before I could walk." Her grandparents were tenant farmers. Her father, Archie, was a U.S. Marine Corps military veteran and union concrete construction worker. Her mother, Wanita, worked for a local public school, as a school bus driver and custodian. In high school, Holscher was a member of 4-H and Future Farmers of America (FFA), where she participated in debate and gave her first speech, about the Ogallala Aquifer. She graduated from Slater High School in 1987. Holscher graduated from the University of Missouri–Columbia in 1992 with degrees in journalism and political science. She is a first-generation college graduate.

== Early career ==
=== Professional career ===
Holscher previously worked at R. H. Donnelley and The Add Sheet. She worked much of her career in operations and corporate management at Sprint, where she designed multibillion-dollar budgets. She also worked as a temporary substitute teacher in Johnson County schools.

=== Political career ===
In 2016, Holscher was elected to represent District 16 in the Kansas House of Representatives, defeating Republican incumbent Amanda Grosserode. She was reelected in 2018.

In 2020, Holscher was elected to represent district 8 in the Kansas Senate, defeating Republican state representative James Todd in a competitive race.

== Governor of Kansas ==
==== 2026 gubernatorial campaign ====
Holscher campaigns in Lawrence, Kansas

On June 12, 2025, Holscher became the first Democrat to announce a bid for the governor of Kansas in the 2026 Kansas gubernatorial election. On May 14, 2026, she announced that Wichita state representative KC Ohaebosim would be her running mate.

Holscher's campaign focused on cost of living and public education. NPR said her campaign had "notes of populism". Holscher drew connections between her Republican opponent, state Senate leader Ty Masterson, and former Governor Brownback's "Kansas experiment" tax policy. Holscher supports cannabis legalization for both medical and recreational uses. She said tax revenue from cannabis legalization could be put toward public education and that Kansas farmers could profit from cultivating cannabis. She seeks a statewide moratorium on data centers. Holscher is critical of Donald Trump's tariffs and their impact on farmers. She supports Medicaid expansion in Kansas.

On election night, the race remained too close to call, with Holscher holding a slim lead. The race remained uncalled until November 12, when Decision Desk HQ and the Associated Press projected Holscher's win. She is set to be sworn in as governor on January 11, 2027. Her victory marked the first time in 60 years that Kansas elected a governor from the same party as a retiring or term-limited incumbent.

== Personal life ==
Holscher is a Christian, attends church regularly, and was raised Lutheran. Holscher married Greg Holscher in September 1992. As of 2026, they had lived in Overland Park, Kansas for more than 20 years. They have three children together.

== Electoral history ==
2016 general election: Kansas House of Representatives, District 16
| Party | Candidate | Votes | % |
|---|---|---|---|
| Democratic | Cindy Holscher | 6,847 | 55.71% |
| Republican | Amanda Grosserode | 5,443 | 44.29% |

2018 general election: Kansas House of Representatives, District 16
| Party | Candidate | Votes | % |
|---|---|---|---|
| Democratic | Cindy Holscher | 6,810 | 58.9% |
| Republican | Susan Huff | 4,751 | 41.1% |

2020 general election: Kansas Senate, District 8
| Party | Candidate | Votes | % |
|---|---|---|---|
| Democratic | Cindy Holscher | 23,686 | 54.4% |
| Republican | James Todd | 19,883 | 45.6% |

2024 general election: Kansas Senate, District 8
| Party | Candidate | Votes | % |
|---|---|---|---|
| Democratic | Cindy Holscher | 24,795 | 61.1% |
| Republican | Benee' Hudson | 15,758 | 38.9% |

2026 Kansas gubernatorial election
| Party | Candidate | Votes | % |
|---|---|---|---|
| Democratic | Cindy Holscher | 562,012 | 50.5% |
| Republican | Ty Masterson | 550,643 | 49.5% |

== See also ==
- List of female governors in the United States

Party political offices
| Preceded by Laura Kelly | Democratic nominee for Governor of Kansas; 2026 | Most recent |
Political offices
| Preceded by Laura Kelly | Governor of Kansas; Taking office 2027 | Elect |
