= Brad Starnes =

Kansas politician

Member of the Kansas Senate from the 22nd district
- Incumbent
- Assumed office January 13, 2025
- Preceded by: Usha Reddi

Personal details
- Born: 1957 (age 68–69)
- Party: Republican
- Spouse: Mari Starnes
- Children: 4

Brad Starnes is an American politician who is currently serving as a Republican member of the Kansas Senate, representing the 22nd district. The district is based in Riley County. He was first elected in 2024, defeating incumbent Democratic state senator Usha Reddi with 51% of the vote. He took office on January 13, 2025.

== Personal life and career ==
Starnes lives in Riley. He is married to his wife Mari and has four kids. Starnes was the superintendent of Wabaunsee Unified School District 329 between 2015 and 2022. He describes himself as a moderate conservative.

Starnes previously ran for the 64th House of Representatives district in 2022.

== Political positions ==
=== Abortion ===
Starnes supports access to some abortions but opposes them being paid for by taxpayers nor late-term abortions.

=== Property taxes ===
In an interview, Starnes stated that property tax relief would be a "number 1 priority."

=== Religion ===
Starnes supports religious freedom under the First Amendment but believes that America is based on "Judeo-Christian values."
