= Bert Chaney =

American politician (1928–2024)

Member of the Kansas Senate from the 34th district
- In office 1973–1984
- Succeeded by: David Kerr

Member of the Kansas House of Representatives from the 101st district
- In office 1967–1972

Personal details
- Born: January 26, 1928 Coffeyville, Kansas, U.S.
- Died: April 11, 2024 (aged 96)
- Party: Democratic
- Spouse: Marilyn Johnson
- Children: 3

Bert Chaney Jr. (January 26, 1928 – April 11, 2024) was an American politician who served in the Kansas State Senate and Kansas House of Representatives from 1967 to 1984.

== Biography ==
Chaney was born in Coffeyville, Kansas, the 14th of 17 children. He taught at Hutchinson Community College for 32 years. In 1966, Chaney was elected to the Kansas House, taking office in January 1967 and serving for three terms. In 1972, he moved up to the State Senate, representing the 34th district for three terms until 1984, when he was defeated by Republican David Kerr.

Chaney married Marilyn Johnson on April 4, 1958; the couple had three children. He died April 11, 2024, at the age of 96.
