= Greg Lewis (politician) =

American politician (1953–2020)

Member of the Kansas House of Representatives from the 113th district
- In office March 12, 2015 – February 22, 2019
- Preceded by: Basil Dannebohm
- Succeeded by: Alicia Straub

Personal details
- Born: June 7, 1953 Ulysses, Kansas, U.S.
- Died: February 17, 2020 (aged 66) Stafford, Kansas, U.S.
- Party: Republican
- Spouse: Susan
- Children: 2
- Education: Kansas State University
- Profession: rancher

Gregory Kent Lewis (June 7, 1953 – February 17, 2020) was an American politician. He has served as a Republican member for the 113th district in the Kansas House of Representatives since 2017. On February 20, 2019, Lewis announced his resignation, effective February 22, 2019, due to a diagnosis of brain cancer. Lewis died February 17, 2020, from a glioblastoma.
