= Alicia Straub =

American politician (born 1978)

Member of the Kansas Senate from the 33rd district
- In office January 11, 2021 – January 13, 2025
- Preceded by: Mary Jo Taylor
- Succeeded by: Tory Marie Blew

Member of the Kansas House of Representatives from the 113th district
- In office March 19, 2019 – January 11, 2021
- Preceded by: Greg Lewis
- Succeeded by: Brett Fairchild

Personal details
- Born: May 17, 1978 (age 48)
- Party: Republican
- Spouse: N/A
- Education: Kansas State University

Alicia Dawn Straub (born May 17, 1978) is an American politician from the state of Kansas. She served as a Republican member of the Kansas House of Representatives, representing the 113th district from 2019 to 2021, and of the Kansas Senate, representing the 33rd district from 2021 to 2025. A resident of Ellinwood, Kansas, she was selected by Republican precinct committee members on March 12, 2019, to succeed Representative Greg Lewis, who resigned due to health issues. Straub was formally appointed by Governor Laura Kelly to the seat on March 14 and was sworn in by Kansas Secretary of State Scott Schwab on March 19. Prior to her election to the House of Representatives, she served as a county commissioner in Barton County, Kansas and was the commission chairman from January to March 2019. She resigned from the county commission from a meeting on March 18, 2019, in order to take her seat in the Kansas Legislature.

During the party convention to succeed Lewis, Straub received 51 votes, with 22 votes going to Doug Keesling, a farmer from Rice County, Kansas and 18 votes going to Donna Hoener-Queal, a retired court services officer from Pratt, Kansas.

Straub defeated Sen. Mary Jo Taylor in the Aug. 4, 2020 Republican primary for the 33rd district of the Kansas Senate. She did not seek re-election in 2024, instead losing a campaign to unseat the incumbent Barton County clerk.

2021-2022 Kansas Senate Committee Assignments

- Vice Chairman of Agriculture and Natural Resources
- Education
- Local Government
- Commerce
- Transparency and Ethics
- Joint Committee on Special Claims Against the State

2019-2020 Kansas House of Representatives Committee Assignments

- Agriculture and Natural Resources Budget
- Local Government
- Agriculture
