= Dennis Kriegshauser =

American politician

Dennis Kriegshauser is a Republican politician from Kansas. He was a Kansas State Senator from October 15, 2012, until January 14, 2013, representing the 8th Senate District. Kriegshauser was elected by Republican Precinct Committeepersons after the resignation of Senator Tim Owens, which created the vacancy.

Jim Denning, who was elected on November 6, 2012, replaced Kriegshauser in the Senate District 8 position when he was sworn in on January 14, 2013, although the boundaries of the district had changed following redistricting in 2012.

Senator Kriegshauser had previously run for the Kansas House of Representatives in 2006 and 2008.
