= Kalvesta, Kansas =

Unincorporated community in Finney County, Kansas

- Unincorporated community
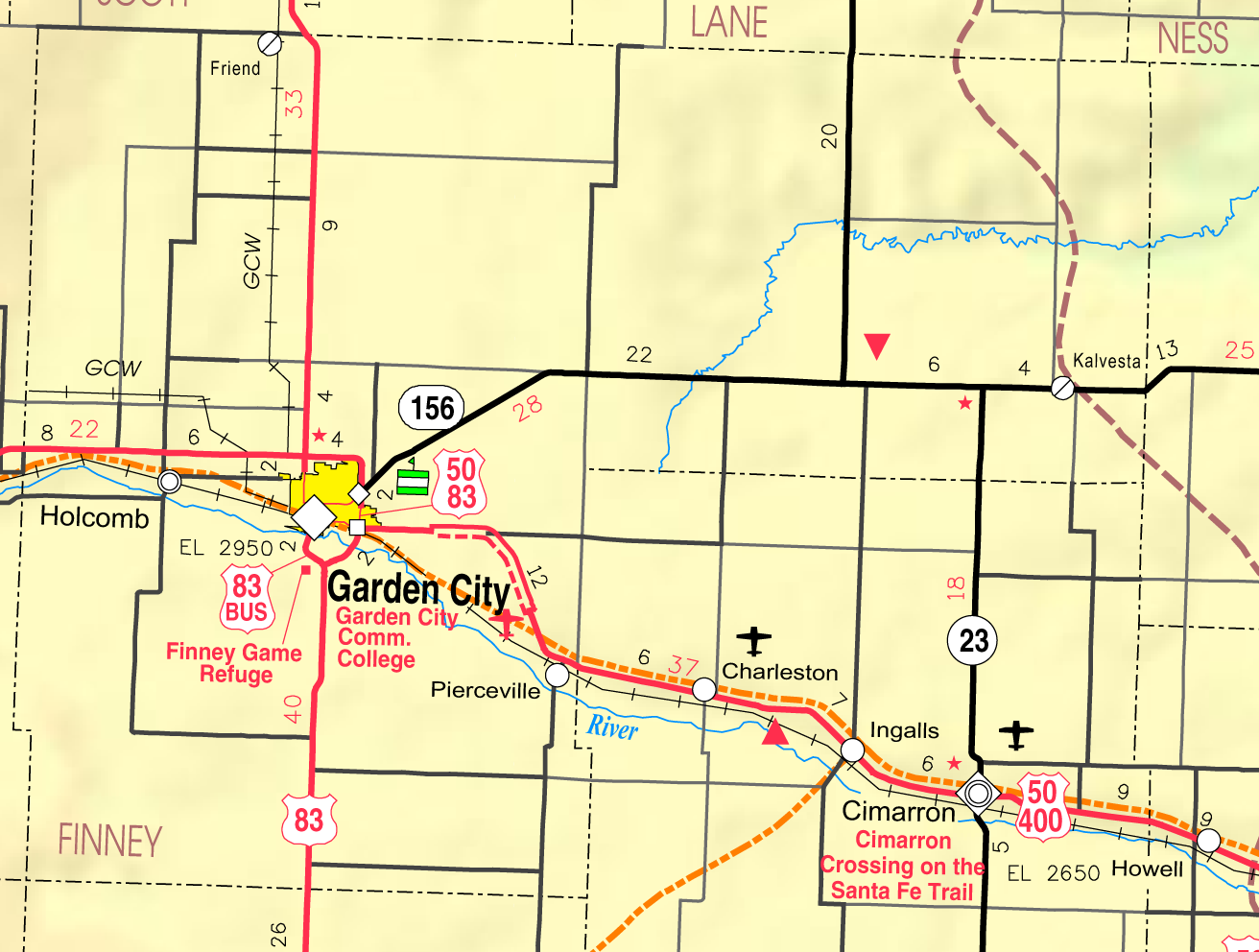
- KDOT map of Finney County (legend)

- Location within Kansas Location within the United States
- Coordinates: 38°03′34″N 100°17′11″W
- Country: United States
- State: Kansas
- County: Finney
- Elevation: 2,667 ft (813 m)
- Time zone: UTC-6 (CST)
  - Summer (DST): UTC-5 (CDT)
- Area code: 620
- FIPS code: 20-35850
- GNIS ID: 471575

Kalvesta is an unincorporated community in Finney County, Kansas, United States. It is located on K-156 about 20 miles (32 km) west of Jetmore and 18 miles (29 km) north-northeast of Cimarron.

== History ==
Kalvesta was derived from the Greek kalos, meaning "beautiful", and Vesta, the Roman goddess of the hearth and home.

Kalvesta had a post office from the 1880s until 1998.

== Geography ==
=== Climate ===
The climate in this area is characterized by hot, humid summers and generally mild to cool winters. According to the Köppen Climate Classification system, Kalvesta has a humid subtropical climate, abbreviated "Cfa" on climate maps.

== Education ==
The community is served by Cimarron–Ensign USD 102 public school district.

== Notable people ==
- Larry Powell, state legislator in Kansas, born in Kalvesta
