= Kansas's 39th Senate district =

American legislative district

Kansas's 39th State Senate district
Senator
Bill Clifford; R–Garden City
- Demographics: 51% White; 2% Black; 43% Hispanic; 2% Asian; 2% Other
- Population (2018): 69,098

Kansas's 39th Senate district is one of 40 districts in the Kansas Senate. It has been represented by Republican Bill Clifford since 2025.

== Geography ==
District 39 is based in Garden City and surrounding areas in the southwestern corner of the state, covering all of Finney, Grant, Greeley, Hamilton, Haskell, Kearny, Morton, Stanton, Stevens, and Wichita Counties. Other communities in the district include Ulysses, Hugoton, Elkhart, Lakin, Holcomb, Syracuse, Sublette, Leoti, and Johnson City.

The district is located entirely within Kansas's 1st congressional district, and overlaps with the 115th, 117th, 118th, 122nd, 123rd, and 124th districts of the Kansas House of Representatives. It borders the states of Oklahoma and Colorado.

== Recent election results ==
=== 2020 ===
2020 Kansas Senate election, District 39
Primary election
Party	Candidate	Votes	%
Republican	John Doll (incumbent)	5,720	57.4
Republican	Lon Pishny	4,249	42.6
Total votes		9,969	100
General election
Republican	John Doll (incumbent)	20,891	100
Total votes		20,891	100
Republican hold			

=== 2016 ===
2016 Kansas Senate election, District 39
Primary election
Party	Candidate	Votes	%
Republican	John Doll	4,664	52.4
Republican	Larry Powell (incumbent)	4,246	47.6
Total votes		8,910	100
General election
Republican	John Doll	12,884	79.0
Democratic	A. Zacheriah Worf	3,421	21.0
Total votes		16,305	100
Republican hold			

=== 2012 ===
2012 Kansas Senate election, District 39
Primary election
Party	Candidate	Votes	%
Republican	Larry Powell	5,106	51.9
Republican	Stephen Morris (incumbent)	4,737	48.1
Total votes		9,843	100
General election
Republican	Larry Powell	16,672	100
Total votes		16,672	100
Republican hold			

=== Federal and statewide results ===
Year	Office	Results
2020	President	Trump 71.5 – 26.5%
2018	Governor	Kobach 54.7 – 29.7%
2016	President	Trump 72.0 – 22.9%
2012	President	Romney 75.9 – 22.3%
