= Marshall Christmann =

American politician (born 1976)

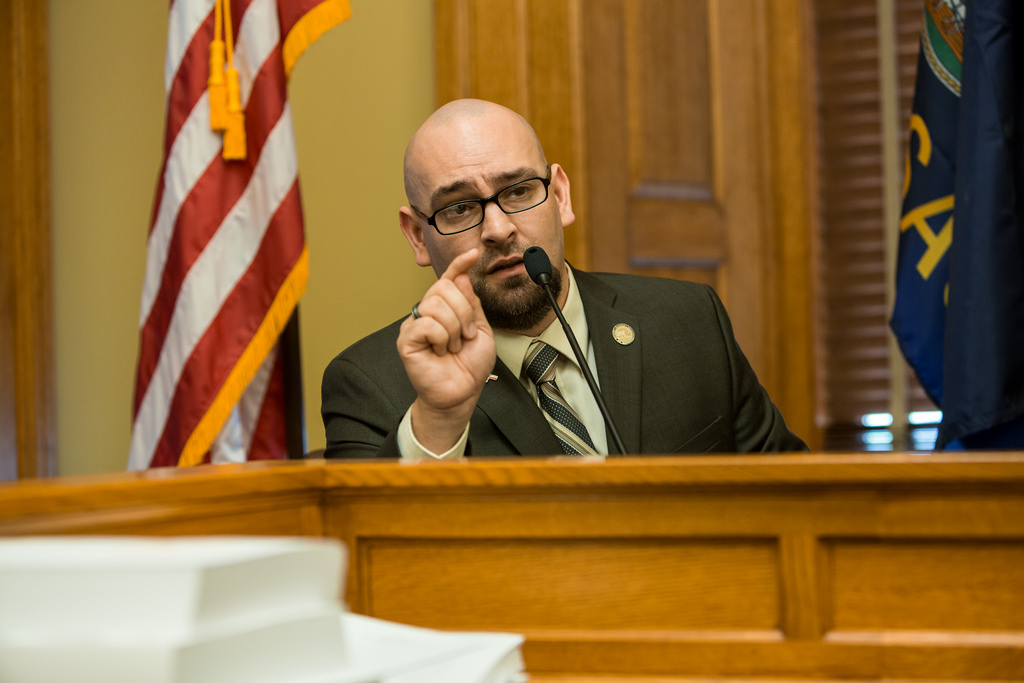

Member of the Kansas House of Representatives from the 113th district
- In office January 14, 2013 – January 11, 2015
- Preceded by: Lorene Bethell
- Succeeded by: Basil Dannebohm

Personal details
- Born: June 25, 1976 (age 50) Portsmouth Naval Hospital, Portsmouth, Virginia, U.S.
- Party: Republican
- Spouse: Elizabeth (Martinez) Christmann
- Education: Fort Hays State University (BA); Hutchinson Community College (AA)

Marshall E. Christmann III (born June 25, 1976) is a former Republican member of the Kansas House of Representatives, representing the 113th District, which included Pratt and Stafford counties as well as portions of Barton, Rice and Pawnee counties.

== Committee assignments ==
Representative Christmann served on these legislative committees:

- Judiciary
- Military, Veterans and Homeland Security
- Energy and Environment
- Vision 2020
- Health and Human Services
- Health and Human Services House/Senate Joint Committee

== Legislative caucuses ==
Representative Christmann served on these Legislative Caucuses:

- House Rural Caucus (Vice-chairman)
- House Multiple Sclerosis Caucus (Vice-chairman)

== Legislative legacy ==
While in the House of Representatives Christmann negotiated to create a port authority in his district. Since the inception of the state in 1861 Kansas has only had four port authority's, of which only three still currently operate in the state. The Christmann negotiations secured a passing vote of 121 to 0 in the House and 40 to 0 in the Senate. The impact helped job growth in Christmann's district that was double the states percentage numbers during his tenure in the House.

== Honors and awards ==
- 2022 – Key to the City of Lyons, Kansas, in recognition of “…the countless successful negotiations between governmental agencies and philanthropic contributions to and for the people and citizens of Lyons, Kansas…”, Presented by Mayor Dustin Schultz
- 2017 – The Michael A. Barbara Award, for significant contributions to the Kansas Judicial System, Kansas Municipal Judges Association
- 2016 – A Tribute Award naming Christmann a "State-wide Visionary", by the Kansas State Senate
- 2015 – Inducted into Mensa International, (IQ of 155), A high IQ society
- 2014 – Appointment as negotiator to the "2014 Federal Relations Task Force" in Washington D.C, by the Speaker of the Kansas House
- 2014 – Appointment as negotiator to the "2014 International Relations Task Force" in Washington D.C, by the Speaker of the Kansas House
- 2014 – Champion of the Taxpayer Award, Americans for Prosperity
- 2014 – Featured in the Journal Magazine (On Civic Leadership) "The Art of the (Healthy) Deal", the Kansas Leadership Center
- 2013 – Legislator of the Year Award, Kansas EMS Association
- 1997 – Best Kansas Mine Rescue Team, Kansas State-Wide Mine Rescue Competition, The Kansas Small Mining Association
