= John Doll (Kansas politician) =

American politician

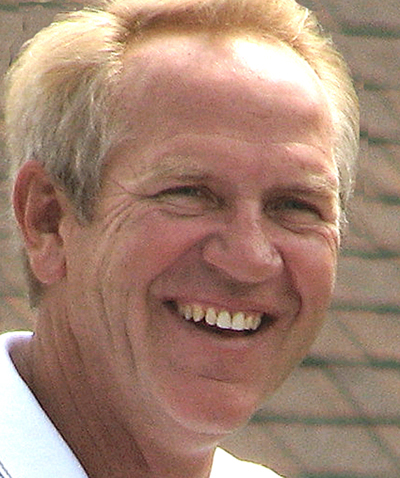

Member of the Kansas Senate from the 39th district
- In office January 9, 2017 – January 13, 2025
- Preceded by: Larry Powell
- Succeeded by: Bill Clifford

Member of the Kansas House of Representatives from the 123rd district
- In office January 14, 2013 – January 9, 2017
- Preceded by: Reynaldo Mesa
- Succeeded by: John Wheeler

Personal details
- Born: July 3, 1957 (age 69) Dodge City, Kansas, U.S.
- Party: Republican (After 2006-2018, 2019–present)
- Other political affiliations: Independent (2018–2019); Democratic (2006)
- Spouse: Janet
- Children: 2
- Education: Emporia State University; St. Mary of the Plains College (BA)

John Doll (born July 3, 1957) is an American politician who served as a Republican member of the Kansas House of Representatives, representing the 123rd district from 2013 to 2017, and of the Kansas Senate, representing the 39th district from 2017 to 2025. He ran for Congress to represent Kansas's 1st congressional district in 2006 as a Democrat. Sometime between 2006 and 2012 he joined the Republican Party. From 2010 to 2011, he served as the mayor of Garden City, Kansas. On March 7, 2018, Doll announced that he would register as an independent and would be the running mate of independent gubernatorial candidate Greg Orman in the gubernatorial election in 2018 to become the next Lieutenant Governor of Kansas. He rejoined the Republican Party in 2019. He did not seek re-election in 2024.
