= Adam Turk =

American politician

Member of the Kansas House of Representatives from the 117th district
- Incumbent
- Assumed office January 9, 2023
- Preceded by: Tatum Lee-Hahn

Personal details
- Party: Republican

Adam Turk is an American politician. A member of the Republican Party, he has served as the representative for the 117th district in the Kansas House of Representatives since 2023.
