= Senator Cheney (disambiguation) =

Person Colby Cheney (1828–1901) was a U.S. Senator from New Hampshire from 1886 to 1887. Senator Cheney may also refer to:

- Hampton J. Cheney (1836–1927), Tennessee State Senate
- Louis R. Cheney (1859–1944), Connecticut State Senate
- Nelson W. Cheney (1875–1944), New York State Senate

== See also ==
- Senator Chaney (disambiguation)
