= Brett Fairchild =

American politician

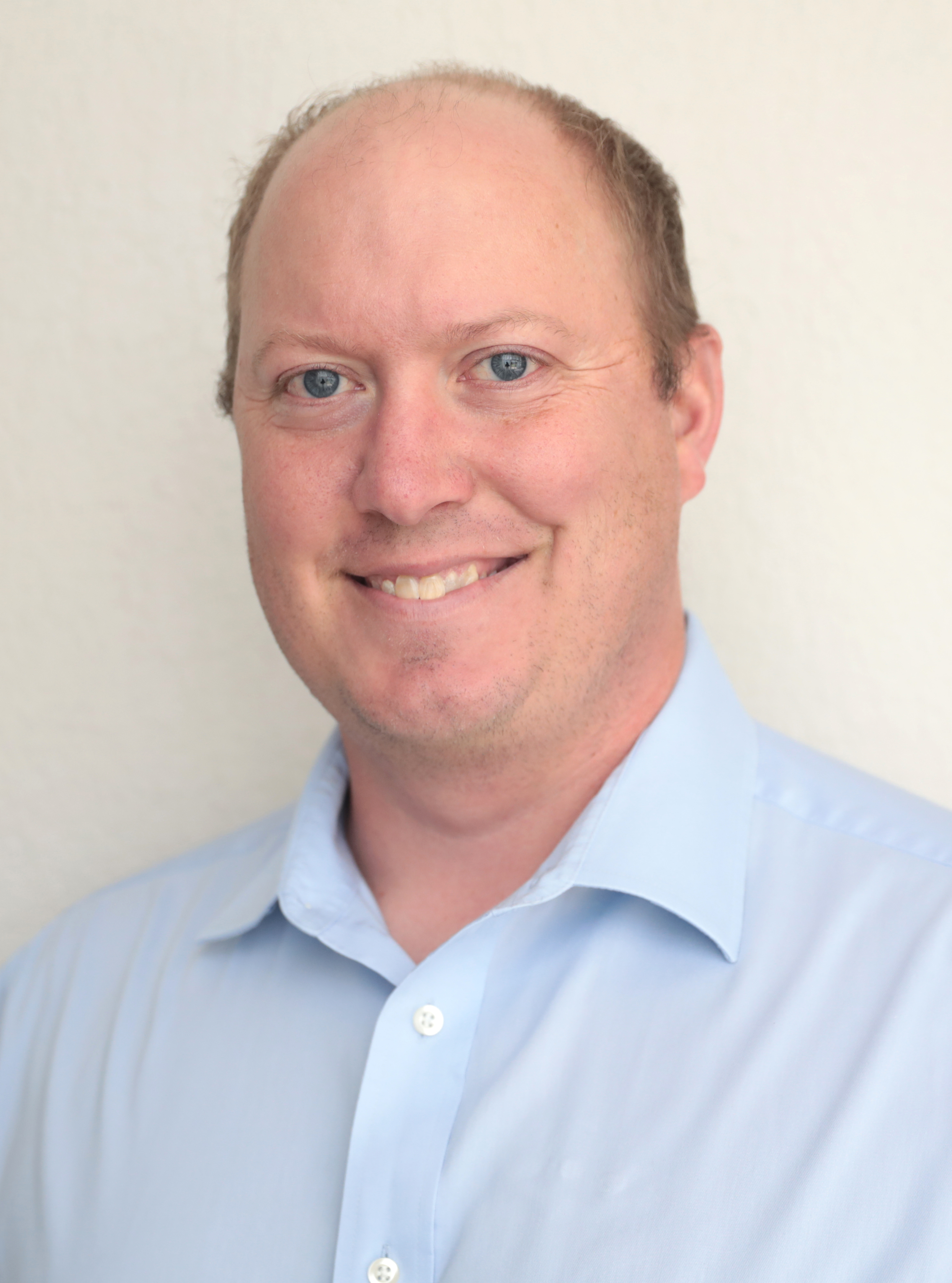
- Fairchild at the 2022 Hazlitt Summit hosted by Young Americans for Liberty Foundation

Member of the Kansas House of Representatives from the 113th district
- Incumbent
- Assumed office January 11, 2021
- Preceded by: Alicia Straub

Personal details
- Born: Stafford, Kansas, U.S.
- Party: Republican
- Education: Sterling College (BBA)
- Website: brettfairchild.com

Brett Fairchild is an American politician serving as a member of the Kansas House of Representatives from the 113th district. Elected in November 2020, he assumed office on January 11, 2021.

== Background ==
Fairchild was born in Stafford, Kansas. He earned a Bachelor of Business Administration from Sterling College. Prior to entering politics, Fairchild worked as a substitute teacher and farmer. Fairchild was elected to the Kansas House of Representatives in November 2020 and assumed office on January 11, 2021, succeeding Alicia Straub.

Fairchild opposed Trump's push the Kansas legislature to redistrict its congressional maps, which could have netted Republicans an additional seat in the U.S. House of Representatives.
