= Richard Hilderbrand =

American politician and businessman (born 1969)

Member of the Kansas Senate from the 13th district
- In office May 1, 2017 – January 8, 2023
- Preceded by: Jake LaTurner
- Succeeded by: Tim Shallenburger

Personal details
- Born: January 26, 1969 (age 57)
- Party: Republican
- Spouse: Marisa

Richard J. Hilderbrand (born January 26, 1969) is an American politician and businessman who served as a member of the Kansas Senate from the 13th district. After Jake LaTurner was appointed Kansas State Treasurer, Hilderbrand was selected to serve for the remainder of his term in the Senate. He resigned from the Senate in January 2023.

== Early career ==
Prior to serving in the Senate, Hilderbrand operated an insurance company and served as a commissioner of Cherokee County, Kansas.

== Personal life ==
Hilderbrand has lived in Baxter Springs, Kansas and Galena, Kansas.
