= John Ewy =

American politician (born 1949)

John L. Ewy

Member of the Kansas House of Representatives from the 117th district
- In office January 14, 2013 – January 9, 2017
- Preceded by: Larry Powell
- Succeeded by: Leonard Mastroni

Personal details
- Born: May 28, 1949 (age 77) Hodgeman County, Kansas, U.S.
- Party: Republican
- Spouse: Marsha
- Children: 5
- Education: Fort Hays State University; Kansas State University
- Profession: college instructor

John L. Ewy (born May 28, 1949) is an American politician. He has served as a Republican member for the 117th district in the Kansas House of Representatives since 2013.
