= Leroy Hayden =

American politician

Member of the Kansas State Senate from the 39th District
- In office 1977–1992
- Succeeded by: Stephen Morris

Personal details
- Born: July 31, 1927 Satanta, Kansas
- Died: February 22, 2008
- Party: Democratic
- Spouse: Mavis Fern Gray Barker (m. 1958)

Leroy Hayden (July 31, 1927–February 22, 2008) was an American politician who served as a Democrat in the Kansas State Senate from 1977 to 1992.
