= Tom Hawk =

American politician

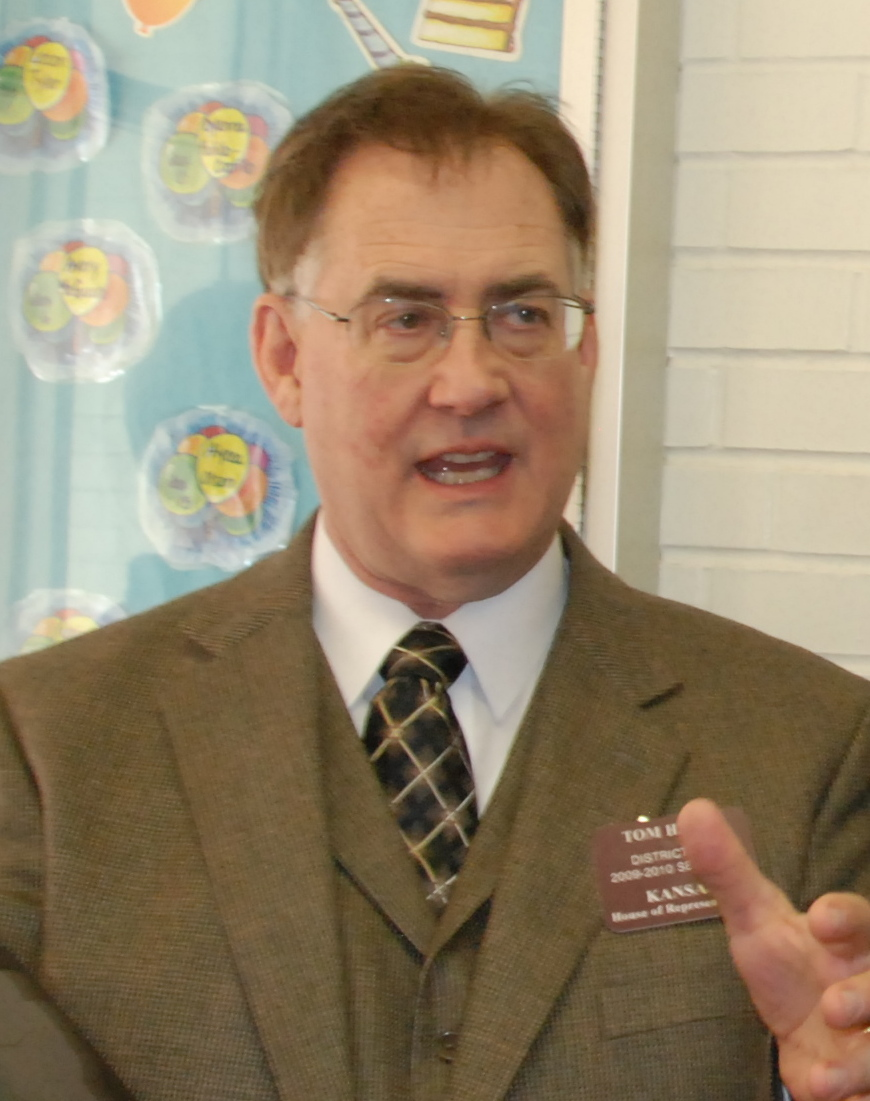

Member of the Kansas Senate from the 22nd district
- In office January 14, 2013 – January 11, 2023
- Preceded by: Roger Reitz
- Succeeded by: Usha Reddi

Member of the Kansas House of Representatives from the 67th district
- In office January 10, 2005 – January 10, 2011
- Preceded by: Roger Reitz
- Succeeded by: Susan Mosier

Personal details
- Born: Thomas Dale Hawk; September 18, 1946 (age 80) Colby, Kansas, U.S.
- Party: Democratic
- Spouse: Diane
- Children: 2
- Education: Kansas State University
- Profession: Educator (retired)

Thomas Dale Hawk (born September 18, 1946) is an American politician and educator who was a Democratic member of the Kansas Senate for the 22nd district until his resignation in 2023. He was formerly a member of the Kansas House of Representatives, representing the 67th District, serving 2005-2011, until being defeated by Republican Susan Mosier.

Hawk previously served on the Governor's Education Policy Task Force, City-County Land Use Task Force, and Governor's Best Team for Agriculture and Natural Resources.

In the 2012 election, Hawk was elected to the Kansas Senate for the 22nd district against Republican Bob Reader, who had defeated incumbent Roger Reitz in the Republican primary election. The 22nd district includes all of Clay and Riley counties and portions of Geary County.

== Committee membership ==
- Taxation
- Vision 2020 (Ranking Member)
- Social Services Budget

== Personal life ==
Hawk is the owner of Tom Hawk Incorporated Professional Photography. He previously served as superintendent, school administrator, counselor and teacher at Manhattan-Ogden Public Schools. He received his BS in math education, MS in counseling, and PhD in educational administration from Kansas State University.

Hawk is married with two children from a previous marriage. His first wife, Tamara Jeanne "Tammi" Hawk, passed away in 2010. Through that marriage, he was formerly related to Representative Sydney Carlin.
