= Tom Phillips (Kansas politician) =

American politician

Member of the Kansas House of Representatives from the 67th district
- In office February 1, 2012 – January 11, 2021
- Preceded by: Susan Mosier
- Succeeded by: Mike Dodson

Personal details
- Born: June 29, 1956 (age 70) Springfield, Missouri, U.S.
- Party: Republican
- Spouse(s): Debra Doubek-Phillips, M.D.
- Education: Kansas State University
- Profession: Land surveyor

Tom Phillips (June 29, 1956) is a former Republican member of the Kansas House of Representatives, representing the 67th district. His term began February 1, 2012 upon the resignation of his predecessor Susan Mosier. Phillips was chosen by 21 of the 39 GOP precinct representatives in the 67th district on the condition that he would seek reelection in 2012.

Phillips was elected to a full term in the November 2012 general election, defeating Democrat Aaron Estabrook.

Phillips is owner of Phillips & Associates, a land surveying company that was established in 1992. He had previous political experience as a city commissioner and mayor of Manhattan, Kansas. He is originally from Fort Scott, Kansas.

== Record ==
Phillips sponsored one bill and ten resolutions in the 2012 session.

== Committee membership ==
Phillips serves on three legislative committees in 2012:

- Aging and Long-term Care
- Health and Human Services
- Government Efficiency

== See also ==
- List of mayors of Manhattan, Kansas
