= Mark Steffen =

American politician

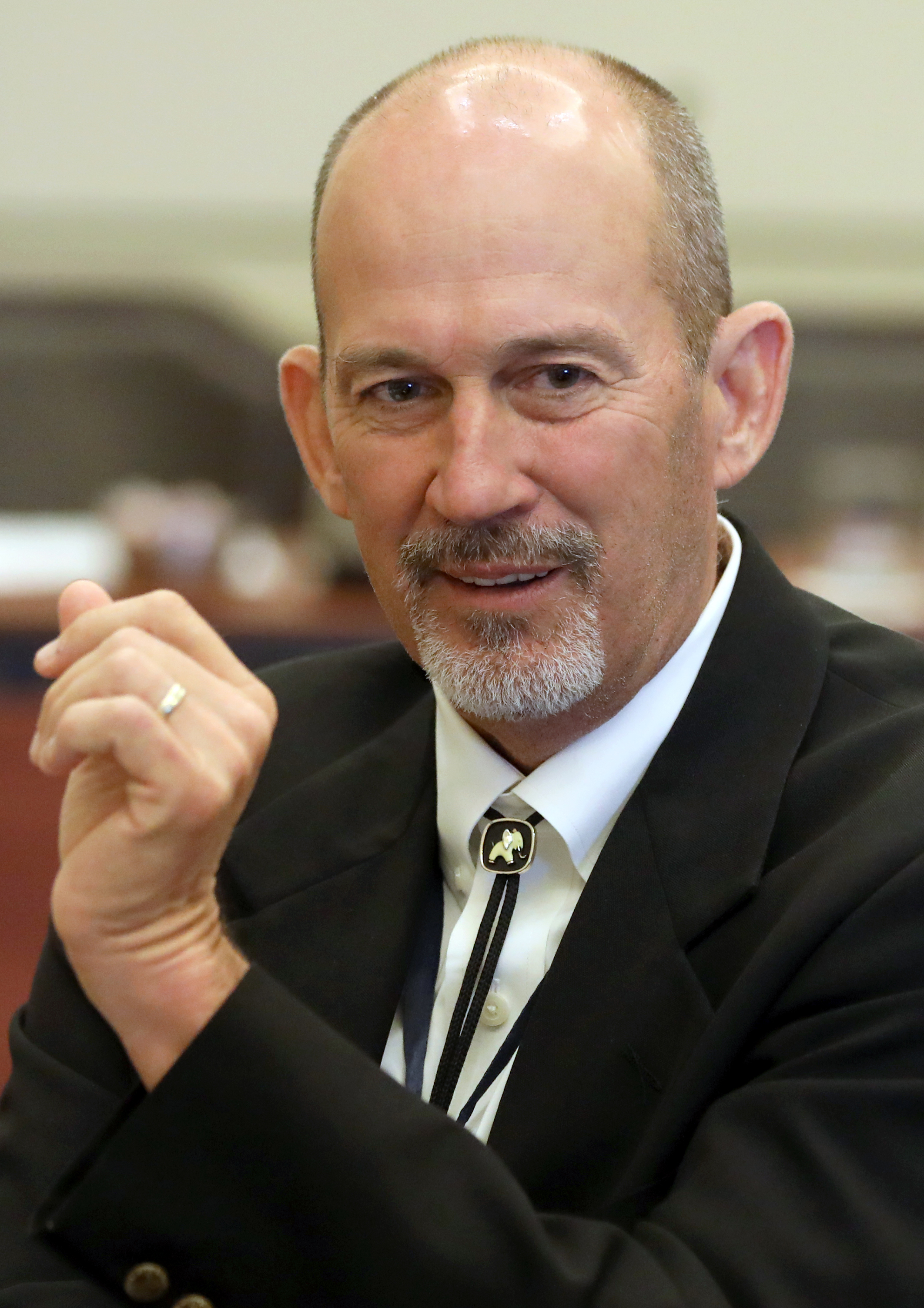

Member of the Kansas Senate from the 34th district
- In office January 11, 2021 – January 13, 2025
- Preceded by: Ed Berger
- Succeeded by: Michael Murphy

Personal details
- Born: August 30, 1962 (age 63) Enid, Oklahoma, U.S.
- Party: Republican
- Spouse: Deanna
- Children: 2
- Education: University of Oklahoma School of Medicine; Northwestern Oklahoma State University

Mark B. Steffen (born August 30, 1962) is an American politician who served as a Republican member of the Kansas Senate from the 34th district. He assumed office in 2021, after beating one-term Republican incumbent Edward Berger with 57.5% of the vote in the August 4, 2020 primary, and Democrat Shanna Henry with 69.8% of the vote in the general election.

== Medical practice ==
Steffen is an anesthesiologist and pain specialist who promoted unproven medications to help sufferers from COVID-19 by the United States Food and Drug Administration, including Ivermectin and Hydroxychloroquine. On January 26, 2022, Steffen reported his practice had been investigated by the Kansas Board of Healing Arts for the previous 18 months. Steffen demanded a hearing to debate the science and later claimed that the government agencies dismissed all complaints. He contended that Dr. Steve Stites, the chief medical officer at The University of Kansas Health System, who was critical of politicians who oppose vaccination and masking, was "the Kansas Dr. Fauci," accusing Stites of spreading "propaganda."

== Tenure ==
In January 2021, Steffen introduced SB187, a bill designed to levy heavy penalties against media corporations that censored political posts. It died in Committee in 2022.

On January 26, 2022, he appeared before a Kansas Senate committee to discuss affordable, effective COVID-19 remedies. He demanded that a "panel of physicians and scientists from both sides of this issue," be convened. An "Early Covid Treatment Symposium" was then held in Lenexa, KS.

In January 2023, Steffen filed the first bill of the legislative session, SB1. It would have subjected online social media to fines of up to $75,000 per instance for platform censorship of user posts, with the Kansas Attorney General given the latitude to bring such cases on behalf of Kansas residents, under the authority of the Kansas Consumer Protection Act. He did not seek re-election in 2024.
