= Lorene Bethell =

American politician

Member of the Kansas House of Representatives from the 113th district
- In office June 1, 2012 – Jan. 14, 2013
- Preceded by: Bob Bethell
- Succeeded by: Marshall Christmann

Personal details
- Party: Republican
- Spouse: Bob Bethell

Lorene Bethell is an American politician who served for seven months as a member of the Kansas House of Representatives. She was picked by Republican Party precinct committee members in the 113th District to succeed her husband, Bob Bethell, who died on May 20 in a car accident. She was sworn in on June 1, 2012, following her formal appointment by Gov. Sam Brownback. She did not seek election to a full term in 2012 and left office in January 2013. Representative Bethell was not appointed to any committees during her tenure in the House of Representatives and attended only one House session during her term, the final session of the 2012 legislative session, which handled primarily ceremonial business.

Kansas House of Representatives
Preceded by Bob Bethell	Kansas House of Representatives Representative from the 113th District; June 1, 2012 - Jan. 14, 2013	Succeeded by Marshall Christmann
