= Basil Dannebohm =

American politician

J. Basil Dannebohm
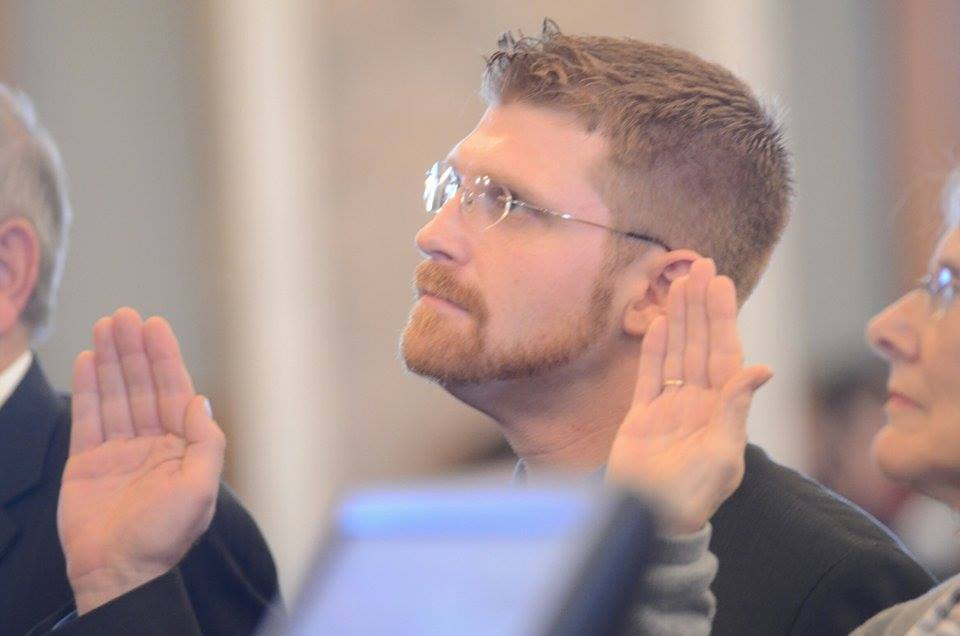
- Representative J. Basil Dannebohm taking the Oath of Office for the Kansas House of Representatives

Member of the Kansas House of Representatives from the 113th district
- In office January 12, 2015 – February 24, 2015
- Preceded by: Marshall Christmann
- Succeeded by: Greg Lewis

Personal details
- Born: September 9, 1981 (age 44) Ellinwood, Kansas, US
- Party: Republican

J. Basil Dannebohm (Jeremy Wayne Dannebohm) is a former Republican member of the Kansas House of Representatives, representing District 113. He was the only non-incumbent to run unopposed during the 2014 election.

In September 2012, Dannebohm was diagnosed with young-onset Parkinson's disease.

On February 24, 2015, after serving only 42 days as a legislator, Dannebohm resigned citing health reasons. He was replaced by Greg Lewis of St. John.

Dannebohm was arrested in Salina, Kansas on June 5, 2019, for "Mistreat dependent adult/elder; Decept $25K-<$100K". Dannebohm's first court appearance was June 6, 2019, with a preliminary hearing scheduled July 23, 2019. All charges were later dropped.

== Committee assignments ==
Representative Dannebohm served on these legislative committees:

- House Standing Committee on Commerce, Labor and Economic Development
- House Standing Committee on Agriculture and Natural Resources
- Vision 2020
