= Larry Powell =

American politician

Member of the Kansas Senate from the 39th district
- In office January 14, 2013 – January 9, 2017
- Preceded by: Stephen Morris
- Succeeded by: John Doll

Member of the Kansas House of Representatives from the 117th district
- In office January 8, 2001 – January 14, 2013
- Preceded by: Robin Jennison
- Succeeded by: John Ewy

Personal details
- Born: September 17, 1939 (age 87) Kalvesta, Kansas, U.S.
- Party: Republican
- Spouse: Myrna Powell
- Children: 3
- Education: Garden City Community College; Kansas State University
- Profession: Rancher

Larry R. Powell is a former Republican member of the Kansas Senate who represented the 39th district from 2013 until 2017. A fourth generation Kansan from Kalvesta, Kansas, he was a member of the Kansas House of Representatives representing the 117th district, from 2001 to 2013.

He was born in Kalvesta, Kansas.

Powell is anti-abortion and is an advocate of the Second Amendment. He is a supporter of local schools, family farms, and opposes tax increases.

He is a Garden City rancher, and is married to Myrna Powell.

== Committee membership ==
Senator Powell serves on the following legislative committees:

- 2015 Special Committee on Agriculture and Natural Resources
- Agriculture (Chair)
- Assessment and Taxation
- Clean Power Plan Implementation Study Committee
- Joint Committee on State Building Construction
- Natural Resources (Chair)
- Ways and Means
- Utilities

== Major donors ==
The top 5 donors to Powell's 2008 campaign:

- 1. Prairie Band Potawatomi Nation $750
- 2. Kansas Realtors Association $500
- 3. Kansas Chamber of Commerce $500
- 4. Koch Industries $500
- 5. Kansas Medical Society $500
