= Amanda Grosserode =

American politician (born 1975)

Member of the Kansas House of Representatives from the 16th district
- In office January 10, 2011 – January 9, 2017
- Preceded by: Gene Rardin
- Succeeded by: Cindy Holscher

Personal details
- Born: December 11, 1975 (age 50) Broken Bow, Nebraska, U.S.
- Party: Republican
- Spouse: Chad
- Education: Wayne State College (Bachelor of Science in Education)

Amanda Grosserode (December 11, 1975) is a former Republican member of the Kansas House of Representatives that represented the 16th district in Johnson County, which includes portions of Overland Park and Lenexa. She defeated her Democratic opponent 55%–45% in 2010 with 3% voting and was unopposed for re-election in 2012.

Amanda served as Chairwoman of the Education Budget Committee, and also served on the Education and Appropriations Committee. The American Conservative Union gave her a 100% evaluation every year she was in the legislature.

She was defeated by Democrat Cindy Holscher on November 8, 2016.

== Sources ==
Preceded by Ward Cassidy	Kansas House of Representatives Chairwoman of the Education Budget Committee; January 12, 2015 – January 9, 2017	Succeeded by
