= Tatum Lee-Hahn =

American politician

Member of the Kansas House of Representatives from the 117th district
- In office October 30, 2020 – January 9, 2023
- Preceded by: Leonard Mastroni
- Succeeded by: Adam Turk

Personal details
- Born: Tatum Lee
- Party: Republican
- Spouse: Scott Hahn

Tatum Lee-Hahn is an American politician who served as a member of the Kansas House of Representatives from the 117th district. She assumed office on October 30, 2020, succeeding Leonard Mastroni, who had died the previous month. She was redistricted into the same district as fellow representative Jim Minnix, and lost renomination to him in 2022.

Prior to her appointment to the House, Lee-Hahn was the development director for R-CALF USA, a livestock company.
