= Susan Mosier =

American politician

Kansas Secretary of Health and Environment
- Incumbent
- Assumed office December 1, 2014
- Governor: Sam Brownback
- Preceded by: Robert Moser
- Succeeded by: Jeff Andersen

Member of the Kansas House of Representatives from the 67th district
- In office January 1, 2011 – February 1, 2012
- Preceded by: Tom Hawk
- Succeeded by: Tom Phillips

Personal details
- Born: July 10, 1959 (age 67) Manhattan, Kansas, U.S.
- Party: Republican
- Education: Kansas State University (B.A.); University of Texas at Austin (M.B.A.); University of Kansas (M.D.)

Susan Kay Mosier (born July 10, 1959) is an American physician who is the former Secretary of the Kansas Department of Health and Environment. On November 13, 2014, Kansas Governor Sam Brownback named Dr. Mosier as the Interim Secretary, replacing Dr. Robert Moser, who stepped down at the end of November. Mosier was a Republican member of the Kansas House of Representatives, representing the 67th district. Her term began in 2011 and she resigned her seat, effective February 1, 2012, to accept the position director of Medicaid in the Kansas Department of Health and Environment.

Mosier is an ophthalmologist and former owner of Mosier Eye Care in Manhattan, Kansas; she closed her practice when appointed Medicaid director for Kansas. She is board certified and has specialties in two areas: eye surgery and refractive surgical procedures.

== Record ==
Mosier sponsored four bills and eleven resolutions in the 2011 session. She sponsored two resolutions in the 2012 session before resigning.

== Same-Sex marriage ==
Once Mosier assumed the office of Secretary of KDHE, her name was substituted for Dr. Moser's in the Marie v. Moser case.

== Committee membership ==
Mosier served on four legislative committees in 2011:

- Insurance
- Joint Committee on Heath Policy Oversight
- Health and Human Services
- Financial Institutions

In 2011, she was assigned to the Special Committee on Financial Institutions and Insurance.

== Campaign donors ==
Mosier's 2010 campaign was 73% donor-funded and 27% self-funded.
