= Laurie Bleeker =

American politician

Member of the Kansas Senate from the 33rd district
- In office 1997 – January 8, 2001
- Succeeded by: Ruth Teichman

Personal details
- Born: November 30, 1954 (age 71)
- Party: Republican

Laurie Bleeker (born November 30, 1954) is an American former politician who served for one term in the Kansas State Senate as a Republican.
