= Mary Jo Taylor =

American politician (born 1953)

Member of the Kansas Senate from the 33rd district
- In office January 9, 2017 – January 11, 2021
- Preceded by: Mitch Holmes
- Succeeded by: Alicia Straub

Personal details
- Born: March 27, 1953 (age 73) Pratt, Kansas, U.S.
- Party: Republican
- Spouse(s): Thomas Eastwood Smith III (m. 1981; died 1984) Todd Taylor
- Children: 6
- Education: Wichita State University; Fort Hays State University

Mary Jo Taylor (born March 27, 1953) is an American politician who served in the Kansas Senate from the 33rd district from 2017 to 2021. She is a former superintendent of schools in Stafford County, Kansas.

Senator Taylor was defeated for a second term in the Aug. 4, 2020 Republican primary by Rep. Alicia Straub.
