= Roger Reitz =

American politician

Member of the Kansas Senate from the 22nd district
- In office January 10, 2005 – January 14, 2013
- Preceded by: Lana Oleen
- Succeeded by: Tom Hawk

Member of the Kansas House of Representatives from the 67th district
- In office January 13, 2003 – January 10, 2005
- Preceded by: Jerry L. Aday
- Succeeded by: Tom Hawk

Personal details
- Born: November 11, 1932 (age 93) St. Joseph, Missouri, U.S.
- Party: Republican
- Spouse: Virginia Reitz
- Education: Kansas State University; University of Kansas School of Medicine
- Profession: Physician

Roger P. Reitz (born November 11, 1932) is an American doctor and politician, who served as a Republican member of the Kansas Senate, representing the 22nd district from 2005 until 2013.

Reitz served as a representative in the Kansas House of Representatives from 2002 to 2005. He previously had served as mayor and city commissioner for the Manhattan City Commission and was president and member of Unified School District 383 School Board. Reitz graduated from Kansas State University and is graduated from the University of Kansas School of Medicine in 1959 with an M.D. He served in the United States Army as a physician. He is a practicing, board-certified doctor of internal medicine.

He is married to Virginia Reitz and lives in Manhattan. He and his wife have five children.

== Elections ==
=== 2012 ===
In the 2012 Republican primary, Reitz was defeated in a three-way race in the Republican primary on August 7, 2012. Bob Reader, whose primary campaign was largely funded by Americans for Prosperity-Kansas, gained the party's nomination, winning 3,318 votes, to Reitz's 2,251 votes and Joe Knopp's 2,134 votes.

Reader was subsequently defeated in the November 2012 general election by former Kansas State Representative Tom Hawk, who was endorsed by Reitz. Hawk was unopposed in the Democratic primary, winning 1,559 votes.

=== 2008 ===
On November 4, 2008 Reitz was re-elected to the 22nd District, defeating Democrat Rusty Wilson by 24 votes.

=== 2004 ===
Bob Reader challenged Reitz in the Republican primary, but was defeated.

== Committee assignments ==
Reitz served on these legislative committees:

- Local Government (chair)
- Federal and State Affairs (vice-chair)
- Joint Committee on Children's Issues
- Commerce
- Joint Committee on Energy and Environmental Policy
- Ethics and Elections
- Joint Committee on Health Policy Oversight
- Utilities

== Major donors ==
Some of the top contributors to Reitz's 2008 campaign, according to the National Institute on Money in State Politics:

Kansas Republican Senatorial Committee, Senator Reitz (self-finance), Greater Kansas City Chamber of Commerce, Kansas Contractors Association, AT&T

Political parties were his largest donor group.
