= Ruth Teichman =

American politician

Member of the Kansas Senate from the 33rd district
- In office January 8, 2001 – January 14, 2013
- Preceded by: Laurie Bleeker
- Succeeded by: Mitch Holmes

Personal details
- Born: January 2, 1943 (age 83) Wichita, Kansas, U.S.
- Party: Republican
- Spouse: Dennis Teichman
- Children: 4
- Profession: farmer, banker

Ruth Teichman (born January 2, 1943) is a former Republican member of the Kansas Senate, representing the 33rd district from 2001 to 2013. She was previously a member of the Stafford Board of Education for 20 years.

A farmer and a banker from Stafford, she is married to Dennis Teichman.

== Committee assignments ==
Teichman served on these legislative committees:

- Financial Institutions and Insurance (chair)
- Natural Resources (vice-chair)
- Education
- Organization, Calendar and Rules
- Joint Committee on Pensions, Investments and Benefits
- Ways and Means

== Major donors ==
Some of the top contributors to Teichman's 2008 campaign, according to the National Institute on Money in State Politics:

Ruth Teichman (self-finance), Kansas Association of Realtors, Koch Industries, Kansas National Education Association, Kansas Hospital Association, American Family Insurance, Farmers Insurance Group

Financial, insurance and real estate companies were her largest donor group.

== Elections ==
Teichman was defeated by Mitch Holmes by a 7,635-6,762 margin in the Republican Primary on Aug. 7, 2012. Seven of eight moderate state senate Republicans, including Morris, targeted by the Koch brothers, were defeated in the 2012 Republican primary, giving incumbent Governor Sam Brownback the margin he needed to effectively restructure state taxation, exempting "S" status filers such as Koch Industries from income taxes.
