= Leonard Mastroni =

American politician (1949–2020)

Member of the Kansas House of Representatives from the 117th district
- In office January 9, 2017 – September 30, 2020
- Preceded by: John Ewy
- Succeeded by: Tatum Lee-Hahn

Personal details
- Born: May 28, 1949 Bridgeport, Connecticut, U.S.
- Died: September 30, 2020 (aged 71) La Crosse, Kansas, U.S.
- Party: Republican
- Spouse: Linda
- Children: 4
- Education: Fort Hays State University (BA)

Leonard A. Mastroni (May 28, 1949 – September 30, 2020) was an American politician. He served as a Republican member for the 117th district in the Kansas House of Representatives from 2017 to 2020.

== Early life and education ==
Mastroni was born in Bridgeport, Connecticut. He received a Bachelor of Arts degree in political science from Fort Hays State University. He also studied law at the National Judicial College of the University of Nevada, Reno.

== Career ==
Mastroni served as a police officer in Denver and as supervising officer of the Central Kansas Drug Task Force. He was elected as a district court judge in the Kansas 24th judicial district in 1981 and served 28 years as a judge. He also served six years as a county commissioner in Rush County, Kansas before his election to the Kansas Legislature.

== Personal life ==
Mastroni lived in La Crosse, Kansas with his wife and family. He died on September 30, 2020, in La Crosse, Kansas at the age of 71.
