= Mitch Holmes =

American politician

Member of the Kansas Senate from the 33rd district
- In office January 14, 2013 – January 9, 2017
- Preceded by: Ruth Teichman
- Succeeded by: Mary Jo Taylor

Member of the Kansas House of Representatives from the 114th district
- In office January 10, 2005 – January 14, 2013
- Preceded by: Melvin Minor
- Succeeded by: Jack Thimesch

Personal details
- Born: June 28, 1962 (age 64) Newton, Kansas, U.S.
- Party: Republican
- Spouse: Michelle
- Children: 5
- Education: DePaul University; Friends University (BS); Hutchinson Community College

Mitch Holmes (born June 28, 1962) was a Republican member of the Kansas House of Representatives, representing the 114th district, where he served from 2005 to 2013. He was then elected to represent the 33rd district in the Kansas Senate in 2012. He decided not to run for reelection on June 1, 2016. During his time in the legislature, he was given evaluations of 69%, 76%, 67%, 73% and the most recent evaluation of 82% from the American Conservative Union.

Prior to his election to the House, Holmes worked as a computer programmer and analyst. He received his certificate in computer programming from DePaul University, a BS in human resource management from Friends University, and an AA in music education from Hutchinson Community College.

== Committee membership ==
- Appropriations
- Federal and State Affairs
- Local Government (Vice-chair)
- Joint Committee on Energy and Environmental Policy
- Joint Committee on Special Claims Against the State (Vice-chair)
- Joint Committee on State Building Construction

== Major donors ==
The top 5 donors to Holmes' 2008 campaign:

1. Koch Industries $600
2. Kansas Assoc of Realtors $500
3. Sunflower Electric Power Corp $400
4. Kansas Land Title Assoc PAC $250
5. HSBC North America $250
