= Jim Denning =

American politician

Majority Leader of the Kansas Senate
- In office January 9, 2017 – January 11, 2021
- Preceded by: Terry Bruce
- Succeeded by: Gene Suellentrop

Member of the Kansas Senate from the 8th district
- In office January 14, 2013 – January 11, 2021
- Preceded by: Tim Owens
- Succeeded by: Cindy Holscher

Member of the Kansas House of Representatives from the 19th district
- In office January 10, 2011 – January 14, 2013
- Preceded by: Dolores Furtado
- Succeeded by: Stephanie Clayton

Personal details
- Born: August 13, 1956 (age 69) Great Bend, Kansas, U.S.
- Party: Republican
- Spouse: Marearl Denning
- Education: Fort Hays State University (BA)

Jim Denning (born August 13, 1956), is a former Republican member of the Kansas Senate, representing the 8th district from 2013 to 2021.

== Early life ==
On August 13, 1956, Denning was born in Great Bend, Kansas. Denning's father was Paul Denning, an oil field worker. Denning's mother was Albertine Denning. Denning was the sixth of nine siblings.

== Education ==
In 1980, Denning earned a B.A. degree in finance from Fort Hays State University.

== Career ==
In 2010, Denning began to serve the Kansas House of Representatives, having defeated incumbent Democrat Dolores Furtado and representing District 19 from 2011 to 2013. Denning was succeeded by Republican Stephanie Clayton. He was first elected to the state Senate in 2012, with support from Governor Sam Brownback, the health care industry and the Koch brothers, defeating moderate Republican incumbent Tim Owens (politician) and was re-elected to the Senate in 2016. On December 5, 2016, Denning was elected as the Senate Majority Leader. The American Conservative Union gave him a lifetime evaluation of 79%. In 2020, he worked with Democratic Governor Laura Kelly to craft a bipartisan Medicaid expansion plan. He said Wagle's tactics were crafted "without my input" nor did they reflect his plans, continuing, "Her statements are obstructive and not how we should be governing."

He did not seek re-election in 2020.

== Personal life ==
Denning's wife is Marearl Denning. They have two children.

Denning's brother Frank was the elected sheriff of Johnson County, Kansas for thirteen years, before retiring in 2017.

Kansas Senate
Preceded by Terry Bruce	Majority Leader of the Kansas Senate; 2017–2021	Succeeded by Gene Suellentrop
