= Michael Murphy (Kansas politician) =

American politician

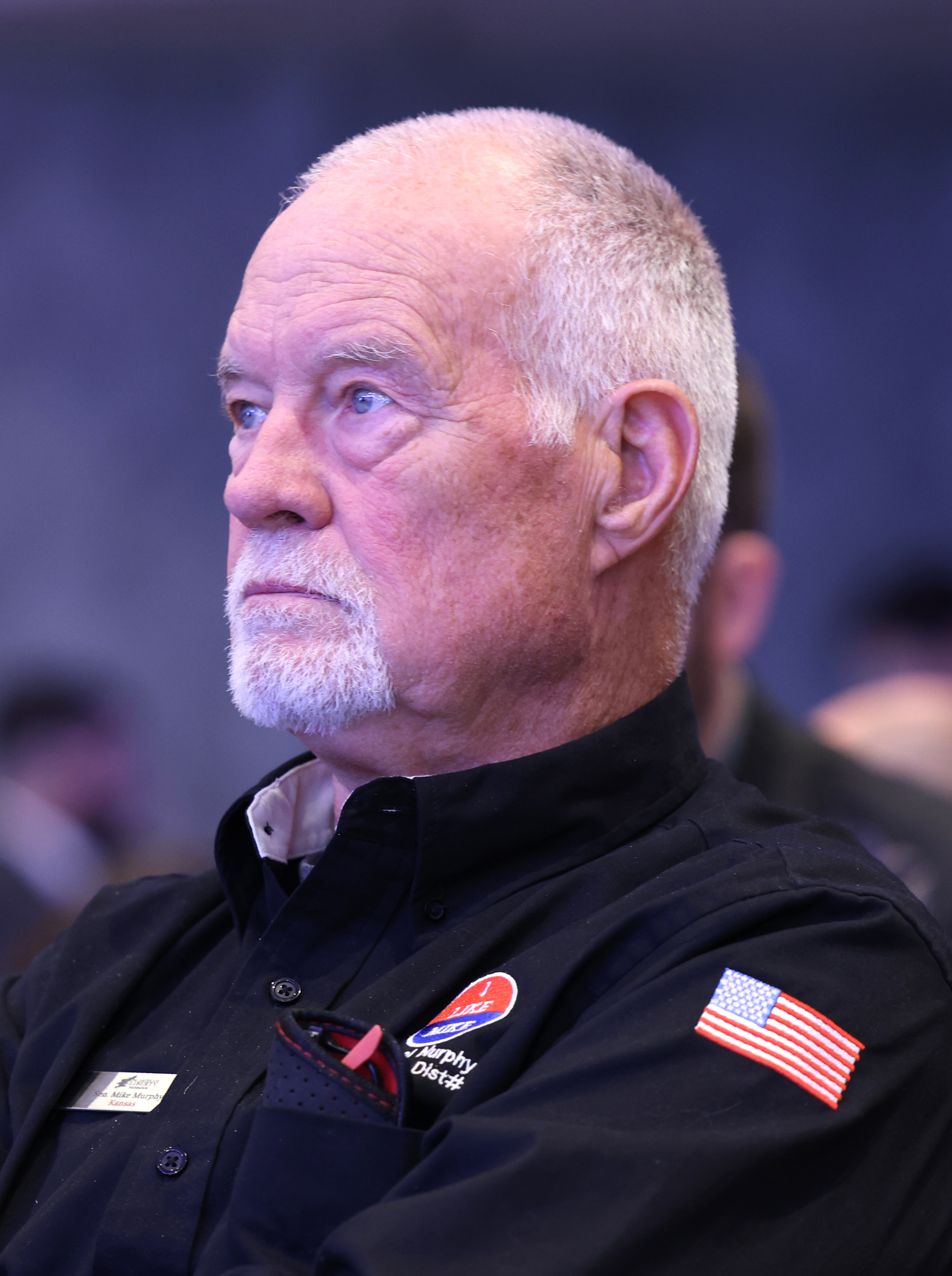
- Murphy in 2024

Member of the Kansas Senate from the 34th district
- Incumbent
- Assumed office January 13, 2025
- Preceded by: Mark Steffen

Member of the Kansas House of Representatives from the 114th district
- In office January 11, 2021 – January 13, 2025
- Preceded by: Jack Thimesch
- Succeeded by: Kevin Schwertfeger

Personal details
- Born: Miami, Oklahoma, U.S.
- Party: Republican
- Education: Ross School of Aviation

Michael Murphy is an American politician and retired pilot from the state of Kansas. He served as a Republican member of the Kansas House of Representatives for the 114th district from 2021 to 2025, and in 2024 was elected to fill the 34th district in the Kansas Senate.

== Early life and education ==
Murphy was born in Miami, Oklahoma. He graduated from the Ross School of Aviation in 1978.

== Career ==
Murphy worked as a pilot for United Airlines from 1990 to 2007. Since retiring, Murphy has operated the Prairie Oaks Inn in Sylvia, Kansas. He also writes opinion articles and hosts a radio show called The Voice of Reason. He was elected to the Kansas House of Representatives in November 2018 and assumed office in January 2021. He was elected to the Kansas Senate in 2024.
