= Tim Owens (politician) =

American politician

Member of the Kansas Senate from the 8th district
- In office January 12, 2009 – September 30, 2012
- Preceded by: Barbara Allen
- Succeeded by: Dennis Kriegshauser

Member of the Kansas House of Representatives from the 19th district
- In office January 13, 2003 – January 12, 2009
- Preceded by: Philip Kearney Kline
- Succeeded by: Jim Denning

Personal details
- Born: 1945 (age 80–81) U.S.
- Party: Republican
- Education: Kansas State University (BA) (1968); Washburn University Law School, (JD) (1974); United States Army Command and General Staff College (1981)

Tim Owens (born 1945) is a former Republican member of the Kansas Senate, representing the 8th district from 2008 to 2012. He was a representative for the 19th district in the Kansas House of Representatives from 2002 until his election as senator. From 1981 to 2005, he served as a council member for the Overland Park City Council, 3rd District. An attorney, he is married with 2 children.

== Disagreement with conservative Republicans ==
Senator Owens made national news as a leading liberal Republican in the Kansas Senate, blocking the state's Health Care Freedom Amendment, an effort to push back parts of the Affordable Care Act. He also argued that judges should be selected by a committee of lawyers rather than the governor. As a consequence of their independence, Owens and seven other moderates were targeted for primary defeats by Koch Industries. He and five others were defeated. Owens and five others were defeated, though two years later, the public voted replacements down. In 2018, Owens was the campaign treasurer for Kansas independent candidate Greg Orman, but he stepped down on October 30, after conceding that only moderate Democrat Laura Kelly could beat anti-immigrant Republican Kris Kobach.

== Committee assignments ==
Owens served on these Senate legislative committees:

- Judiciary (chair)
- Confirmation Oversight
- Joint Committee on Corrections and Juvenile Justice Oversight
- Education
- Federal and State Affairs
- Joint Committee on Kansas Security

== Major Donors ==
Some of the top contributors to Owens's 2008 campaign, according to the National Institute on Money in State Politics:

Kansas Republican Senatorial Committee, Hallmark Cards, Kansas Contractors Association, Kansas Association of Realtors, Kansas Medical Society, and others

Finance, insurance, and real estate companies were his largest donor group.

== Elections ==
=== 2008 ===
Running for an open Senate seat, Owens defeated fellow House member Benjamin Hodge in the Republican primary and Democrat Judy Macy in the general election.

=== 2012 ===
In the 2012 Republican primary, Owens lost to former Johnson County Sheriff Jim Denning, who won the general election.
