= David Kerr (Kansas politician) =

American politician

President of the Kansas Senate
- In office January 8, 2001 – 2004
- Preceded by: Dick Bond
- Succeeded by: Stephen Morris

Member of the Kansas State Senate from the 34th District
- In office 1985–2004
- Preceded by: Bert Chaney
- Succeeded by: Terry Bruce

Personal details
- Born: May 4, 1945 Pratt, Kansas
- Party: Republican
- Relations: Fred Kerr (brother)

David Kerr (born May 4, 1945) is an American former politician who spent two decades as a Republican in the Kansas State Senate.

Born in the town of Pratt, Kerr grew up in Coats, Kansas and attended the University of Kansas, where he received his M.B.A. After working internationally for Trans-World Airlines, he returned to Kansas and successfully ran for the 34th Senate district in 1984.

Kerr spent the next two decades serving in the Senate. He eventually rose to become chairman of the Ways and Means Committee, as well as serving as president of the Senate from 2001 to 2004. In 2002, he sought the GOP nomination for governor, but didn't win the primary election. He declined to run for reelection in 2004.
