= Bill Clifford (politician) =

American politician

William Clifford

Member of the Kansas Senate from the 39th district
- Incumbent
- Assumed office January 13, 2025
- Preceded by: John Doll

Member of the Kansas House of Representatives from the 122nd district
- In office January 11, 2021 – January 13, 2025
- Succeeded by: Lon Pishny

Personal details
- Born: near Junction City, Kansas
- Party: Republican
- Spouse: Jean Clifford
- Children: 6
- Education: United States Air Force Academy; University of Southern California (MD)
- Profession: Ophthalmologist

William Clifford is an American politician. He served as a Republican member for the 122nd district in the Kansas House of Representatives from 2021 to 2025, when he began serving the 39th district in the Kansas Senate. In 2020, he ran for Kansas's 1st congressional district, but lost to Tracey Mann.

== Biography ==
Clifford graduated from the United States Air Force Academy in 1976 and served in the United States Air Force for ten years. During his time in the Air Force, he was stationed in Europe as a F-15 jet fighter pilot. After leaving the Air Force, he pursued a medical degree, earning his Doctor of Medicine from the University of Southern California Keck School of Medicine. After medical school, Clifford completed an internship in internal medicine at the University of Utah School of Medicine in Salt Lake City.

Following his internship, Clifford then pursued residency training in ophthalmology at the University of Oklahoma Health Sciences Center's Dean A. McGee Eye Institute in Oklahoma City, where he also completed a joint fellowship in glaucoma and cornea/refractive surgery.

After completing his fellowship, Clifford spent one year at King Khaled Eye Specialist Hospital in Riyadh, Saudi Arabia. In 1995, he became an ophthalmologist at Fry Eye Associates, a medical practice he co-owns in Garden City, Kansas. He served on the Garden City Community College Board of Trustees for 14 years and became a member of the Finney County Commission in 2014.

Clifford is a lifetime member of the National Rifle Association of America.
