= Kansas's 22nd Senate district =

American legislative district

Kansas's 22nd State Senate district
Senator
Brad Starnes; R–Riley
- Demographics: 78% White; 5% Black; 8% Hispanic; 4% Asian; 3% Other
- Population (2018): 87,096

Kansas's 22nd Senate district is one of 40 districts in the Kansas Senate. It has been represented by Republican Brad Starnes since 2025.

== Geography ==
District 22 is based in Manhattan, covering all of Clay and Riley counties as well as a small part of northern Geary County. Other communities in the district include Clay Center, Ogden, Wakefield, Riley, and parts of western Junction City.

The district is located entirely within Kansas's 1st congressional district, and overlaps with the 51st, 64th, 65th, 66th, 67th, 68th, and 70th districts of the Kansas House of Representatives.

== Recent election results ==
=== 2020 ===
2020 Kansas Senate election, District 22
Primary election
Party	Candidate	Votes	%
Republican	Craig Bowser	5,232	60.5
Republican	Bryan Pruitt	3,411	39.5
Total votes		8,643	100
General election
Democratic	Tom Hawk (incumbent)	15,687	51.3
Republican	Craig Bowser	14,911	48.7
Total votes		30,598	100
Democratic hold			

=== 2016 ===
2016 Kansas Senate election, District 22
Party	Candidate	Votes	%
Democratic	Tom Hawk (incumbent)	20,849	100
Total votes		20,849	100
Democratic hold			

=== 2012 ===
2012 Kansas Senate election, District 22
Primary election
Party	Candidate	Votes	%
Republican	Bob Reader	3,318	43.1
Republican	Roger Reitz (incumbent)	2,251	29.2
Republican	Joe Knopp	2,134	27.7
Total votes		7,703	100
General election
Democratic	Tom Hawk	12,851	50.8
Republican	Bob Reader	12,469	49.2
Total votes		25,320	100
Democratic gain from Republican			

=== Federal and statewide results ===
Year	Office	Results
2020	President	Trump 51.3 – 45.5%
2018	Governor	Kelly 52.6 – 36.7%
2016	President	Trump 52.5 – 39.2%
2012	President	Romney 58.4 – 39.1%
