= Bob Marshall (Kansas politician) =

American politician (born 1937)

Member of the Kansas Senate from the 13th district
- In office January 9, 2009 – January 8, 2013
- Preceded by: Jim Barone
- Succeeded by: Jacob LaTurner

Personal details
- Born: December 7, 1937 (age 88) Sedalia, Missouri, U.S.
- Died: September 20, 2023 Fort Scott, KS
- Party: Republican
- Spouse: Judy Marshall
- Profession: airplane pilot

Bob Marshall (born December 7, 1937) is a Republican politician who was a member of the Kansas Senate, representing the 13th district from 2009 until 2013. He was defeated in the 2012 Republican primary by Jacob LaTurner.

He is a retired airplane pilot from Fort Scott.

== Committee assignments ==
Sen. Marshall served on these legislative committees:

- Transportation (vice-chair)
- Assessment and Taxation
- Confirmation Oversight
- Joint Committee on Economic Development
- Education
- Local Government

== Major donors ==
Some of the top contributors to Marshall's 2008 campaign, according to the National Institute on Money in State Politics:

Kansas Republican Senatorial Committee, Crawford County Republican Central Committee, Bob Marshall(self-finance), Kansas Contractors Associations, QC Holdings Inc.

Political parties were his largest donor group.
