= Gene Rardin =

American politician

Member of the Kansas House of Representatives from the 16th district
- In office January 8, 2007 – January 10, 2011
- Preceded by: James Yonally
- Succeeded by: Amanda Grosserode

Personal details
- Born: Shawnee Mission, Kansas, U.S.
- Party: Democratic
- Spouse: Juanita (m. 1964; died 2009)
- Children: 2
- Education: University of Kansas; University of Missouri in Kansas City

Gene Rardin is a former Democratic member of the Kansas House of Representatives, who represented the 16th district. He served from 2007 - 2011. Rardin ran for re-election in 2010 but was defeated in the general election.

== Career ==
Prior to his election, Rardin worked as a teacher with the Shawnee Mission School District, a project engineer for Kansas City Power and Light Company, and a telecommunications manager. In addition, he had owned his own Career Consulting and Training Business for 14 years.

Rardin received degrees in both Education and Electrical Engineering from the University of Kansas. He also has an MBA from the University of Missouri in Kansas City.

== Elections ==
In 2006, Rardin was unopposed in the Democratic primary on August 1, 2006. He was opposed by John Dennis Kriegshauser, who defeated Jim Yonally, a moderate Republican. in the primary, 1,205 to 1,069 votes. In the November 7, general election, he defeated Kriegshauser after an extensive recount, by just three votes, 4,131 to 4,128.

In 2008, with the help of the presidential election year's higher turnout, Rardin defeated Yonally in the general election by 5,522 votes to Yonally's 5,431.

In 2010 Rardin was defeated for reelection, by Republican Amanda Grosserode Rardin received 3,530 votes, Grosserode 4,266.

== Personal life ==
Rardin and his wife Juanita were married in 1964. They volunteered at the Missouri Repertory Theatre. She died in August 2009. They had two children, Michael, in 1972, and Jessica, in 1974, and three grandchildren, Alyse, Dakotah, and Allison Decker.

== Committee membership ==
- Taxation
- Transportation
- Education Budget

== Major donors ==
The top 5 donors to Rardin's 2008 campaign:

- 1. Rardin, Gene $10,000
- 2. Kansas Medical Society $1,000
- 3. Kansas National Education Assoc $1,000
- 4. Kansans for Lifesaving Cures $1,000
- 5. Sheet Metal Workers Local 2 $1,000
