= Kansas's 34th Senate district =

American legislative district

Kansas's 34th State Senate district
Senator
Michael Murphy; R–Hutchinson
- Demographics: 85% White; 2% Black; 9% Hispanic; 0% Asian; 1% Native American; 2% Other
- Population (2018): 68,781

Kansas's 34th Senate district is one of 40 districts in the Kansas Senate. It has been represented by Republican Michael Murphy since 2025.

== Geography ==
District 34 covers all of Reno County and parts of Kingman County to the west of Wichita, including the communities of Hutchinson, Kingman, South Hutchinson, Buhler, Haven, and Nickerson.

The district is located largely within Kansas's 1st congressional district, with a small part extending into the 4th district. It overlaps with the 101st, 102nd, 104th, and 114th districts of the Kansas House of Representatives.

== Recent election results ==
=== 2020 ===
2020 Kansas Senate election, District 34
Primary election
Party	Candidate	Votes	%
Republican	Mark Steffen	7,177	57.5
Republican	Ed Berger (incumbent)	5,302	42.5
Total votes		12,479	100
General election
Republican	Mark Steffen	21,240	69.8
Democratic	Shanna Henry	9,192	30.2
Total votes		30,432	100
Republican hold			

=== 2016 ===
2016 Kansas Senate election, District 34
Primary election
Party	Candidate	Votes	%
Republican	Ed Berger	6,279	57.2
Republican	Terry Bruce (incumbent)	4,701	42.8
Total votes		10,980	100
General election
Republican	Ed Berger	21,559	82.2
Democratic	Homer Gilson	4,664	17.8
Total votes		26,223	100
Republican hold			

=== 2012 ===
2012 Kansas Senate election, District 34
Party	Candidate	Votes	%
Republican	Terry Bruce (incumbent)	16,007	59.9
Democratic	Mark Treaster	10,711	40.1
Total votes		26,718	100
Republican hold			

=== Federal and statewide results ===
Year	Office	Results
2020	President	Trump 67.2 – 30.5%
2018	Governor	Kobach 48.2 – 40.8%
2016	President	Trump 65.5 – 27.5%
2012	President	Romney 65.3 – 32.2%
