= Jack Thimesch =

American politician

Member of the Kansas House of Representatives from the 114th district
- In office January 14, 2013 – January 11, 2021
- Preceded by: Mitch Holmes
- Succeeded by: Michael Murphy

Personal details
- Born: 1960 (age 65–66)
- Party: Republican
- Spouse: Diane (died 2014)

Jack Thimesch (born 1960) is an American politician who served as a Republican member for the 114th district in the Kansas House of Representatives from 2013 to 2021.
