= Bob Bethell =

American politician (1942–2012)

Member of the Kansas House of Representatives from the 113th district
- In office January 11, 1999 – May 20, 2012
- Preceded by: J. R. Wempe
- Succeeded by: Lorene Bethell

Personal details
- Born: November 5, 1942
- Died: May 20, 2012 (aged 69)
- Party: Republican
- Spouse: Lorene Bethell
- Education: John Brown University; University of Illinois Urbana-Champaign

Bob Bethell (November 5, 1942 – May 20, 2012) was a Republican member of the Kansas House of Representatives, representing the 113th district. He served from 1999 until his death on May 20, 2012.

Prior to his election to the House, Bethell served as mayor of the town of Alden, Kansas. He had also worked as a long term care administrator, pastor, high school vice principal, middle school principal, and college director of admissions.

He received his MEd in Administration from the University of Illinois at Urbana–Champaign and a BS in Secondary Education from John Brown University.

Bethell died May 20, 2012, after a one-car accident on Interstate 70 in Wabaunsee County, Kansas, on his way home from the conclusion of the 2012 Kansas House of Representatives legislative session. He was 69.

He was succeeded in the House of Representatives by his wife, Lorene Bethell.

== Committee membership ==
- Commerce and Labor
- Corrections and Juvenile Justice
- Elections
- Aging and Long Term Care (Chair)
- Joint Committee on Health Policy Oversight
- Joint Committee on Home and Community Based Services Oversight (Vice-Chair)
