= Stephen Morris (politician) =

American politician (1946–2025)

President of the Kansas Senate
- In office 2005 – January 13, 2012
- Preceded by: Dave Kerr
- Succeeded by: Susan Wagle

Member of the Kansas Senate from the 39th district
- In office January 11, 1993 – January 14, 2013
- Preceded by: Leroy Hayden
- Succeeded by: Larry Powell

President of the National Conference of State Legislatures
- In office 2011–2012
- Preceded by: Richard T. Moore
- Succeeded by: Terie Norelli

Personal details
- Born: January 4, 1946 Garden City, Kansas, U.S
- Died: November 1, 2025 (aged 79) Hugoton, Kansas, U.S.
- Party: Republican
- Spouse: Barbara Morris
- Children: Stephanie Heger, Susan Morris, Sara Tasset
- Education: Kansas State University, Manhattan

Stephen Morris (January 4, 1946 – November 1, 2025) was an American politician who was a Republican member of the Kansas Senate, representing the 39th district from 1993 to 2013. He was Senate president from 2005 to 2013. From 1977 to 1993, he served as the vice-president, then president of the Kansas Unified School District 210, Board of Education. He was a farmer from Hugoton.

From 2011 to 2012, he served as president of the National Conference of State Legislatures.

Morris died on November 1, 2025, at the age of 79.

== Committee assignments ==
Morris served on these legislative committees:

- Interstate Cooperation (chair)
- Joint Committee on Legislative Coordinating Council (chair)
- Organization, Calendar and Rules (chair)
- Joint Committee on Pensions, Investments and Benefits (vice-chair)
- Agriculture
- Federal and State Affairs
- Natural Resources

== Major donors ==
Some of the top contributors to Morris's 2008 campaign, according to the National Institute on Money in State Politics:

Kansas for Quality Mental Health Services, Astrazeneca, Kansas Association of Realtors, Westlink Communications, Heavy Constructors Association. Financial, insurance and real estate companies were his largest donor group.

== Elections ==
In 1992, Morris defeated incumbent Democrat Leroy Hayden, by 15,178 to 7,456 votes. Seven of eight moderate state senate Republicans, including Morris, targeted by the Koch brothers, were defeated in the 2012 Republican primary, giving incumbent Governor Sam Brownback the margin he needed to effectively restructure state taxation, exempting "S" status filers such as Koch Industries from income taxes. Morris lost to Larry Powell by a 5,106-4,737 margin in the primary on August 7, 2012. In 2014, Morris, as a member of Republicans for Kansas Values, supported Democratic State Representative Paul Davis for governor, over Brownback.
