= Terry Bruce (politician) =

American politician (born 1975)

Member of the Kansas Senate from the 34th district
- In office January 10, 2005 – January 9, 2017
- Preceded by: David Kerr
- Succeeded by: Ed Berger

Personal details
- Born: March 6, 1975 (age 51)
- Party: Republican
- Spouse: Sarah Bruce
- Education: Fort Hays State University; University of Kansas School of Law
- Profession: attorney

Franklin Terry Bruce (born March 6, 1975) is a former Republican member of the Kansas Senate, representing the 34th district from 2005 until 2017. He previously worked as an Assistant District Attorney for Reno County, Kansas. He has also interned with Speaker of the House Robin Jennison and has worked for House Majority Leader Clay Aurand.

He first served in the Kansas Senate beginning in 2005. However, he lost his primary in 2016 to fellow Republican Ed Berger.

== Controversies ==
=== Sales tax increase ===
In June 2015, Bruce voted in favor of SB 270, which increased Kansas state sales tax from 6.15% to 6.5%, while also increasing the cigarette tax by 50 cents. According to the American Tax Foundation, this was the 8th highest tax increase in the history of the United States.

=== Gay marriage ===
In March 2014, Bruce stated that he supported Kansas's ban on gay marriage and opposed efforts then to remove the ban.

== Committee assignments ==
Since 2013, Senator Bruce has served on the following legislative committees:

- 2013 Special Committee on Judiciary
- Assessment and Taxation
- Confirmation Oversight, chair
- Interstate Cooperation, vice-chair
- Joint Committee on Special Claims Against the State
- Judiciary
- Legislative Coordinating Council
- Organization, Calendar and Rules, vice-chair

== Major donors ==
Some of the top contributors to Sen. Bruce's 2008 campaign, according to the National Institute on Money in State Politics:

Terry Bruce (self-finance), Kansas Republican Senatorial Committee, Kansas Chamber of Commerce, Kansas Republican Senatorial Committee, Kansas Bankers Association

Sen. Bruce financed $22,972 of his own campaign, more than any of his other donor groups.
