= Ed Berger (politician) =

American politician

Edward E. Berger

Member of the Kansas Senate from the 34th district
- In office January 9, 2017 – January 11, 2021
- Preceded by: Terry Bruce
- Succeeded by: Mark Steffen

Personal details
- Born: July 29, 1945 (age 80) Harvey County, Kansas, U.S.
- Party: Republican
- Spouse: Carole
- Children: 2
- Education: Wichita State University (BA, MA); Kansas State University (EdD)
- Website: Official website

Edward E. Berger (July 29, 1945) is an American educator and politician from the state of Kansas. A Republican, Berger has represented the 34th district of the Kansas Senate, based in Reno County, since 2017. He was defeated in the 2020 Republican primary by doctor Mark Steffen.

Berger was first elected after defeating Senate Majority Leader Terry Bruce in the 2016 Republican primary, a victory that was attributed to Berger's opposition to income tax cuts that Bruce had championed. Prior to his election to the Senate, Berger served as the president of Hutchinson Community College for 23 years, and continues to run his own consulting business.

Berger lives in Hutchinson with his wife Carol; they have two children.
