= Kansas's 33rd Senate district =

American legislative district

Kansas's 33rd State Senate district
Senator
| Tory Marie Blew; R–Ellinwood |
- Demographics: 84% White; 1% Black; 12% Hispanic; 0% Asian; 1% Native American; 2% Other
- Population (2018): 68,480

Kansas's 33rd Senate district is one of 40 districts in the Kansas Senate. It has been represented by Republican Tory Marie Blew since 2025.

== Geography ==
District 33 covers a large swath of rural west-central Kansas, including all of Barton, Edwards, Kiowa, Lane, Ness, Pawnee, Pratt, Rush, Scott, and Stafford Counties as well as parts of Hodgeman and Rice Counties. Communities in the district include Great Bend, Pratt, Larned, Scott City, and Ness City.

The district overlaps with Kansas's 1st and 4th congressional districts, and with the 108th, 109th, 112th, 113th, 117th, and 118th districts of the Kansas House of Representatives.

== Recent election results ==
=== 2020 ===
2020 Kansas Senate election, District 33
Primary election
| Party | Candidate | Votes | % |
|---|---|---|---|
| Republican | Alicia Straub | 9,257 | 59.8 |
| Republican | Mary Jo Taylor (incumbent) | 6,218 | 40.2 |
| Total votes | | 15,475 | 100 |
General election
| Republican | Alicia Straub | 26,740 | 100 |
| Total votes | | 26,740 | 100 |
| Republican hold | | | |

=== 2016 ===
2016 Kansas Senate election, District 33
Primary election
| Party | Candidate | Votes | % |
|---|---|---|---|
| Republican | Mary Jo Taylor | 7,334 | 51.8 |
| Republican | Larry Salmans | 6,816 | 48.2 |
| Total votes | | 14,150 | 100 |
General election
| Republican | Mary Jo Taylor | 21,114 | 76.6 |
| Democratic | Matt Bristow | 6,467 | 23.4 |
| Total votes | | 27,581 | 100 |
| Republican hold | | | |

=== 2012 ===
2012 Kansas Senate election, District 33
Primary election
| Party | Candidate | Votes | % |
|---|---|---|---|
| Republican | Mitch Holmes | 7,635 | 53.0 |
| Republican | Ruth Teichman (incumbent) | 6,762 | 47.0 |
| Total votes | | 14,397 | 100 |
General election
| Republican | Mitch Holmes | 23,049 | 100 |
| Total votes | | 23,049 | 100 |
| Republican hold | | | |

=== Federal and statewide results ===
| Year | Office | Results |
|---|---|---|
| 2020 | President | Trump 79.2 – 18.9% |
| 2018 | Governor | Kobach 58.0 – 29.5% |
| 2016 | President | Trump 78.3 – 16.7% |
| 2012 | President | Romney 76.7 – 21.6% |
