= Kansas's 8th Senate district =

American legislative district

Kansas's 8th State Senate district
Senator
Cindy Holscher; D–Overland Park
- Demographics: 80% White; 5% Black; 6% Hispanic; 7% Asian; 2% Other
- Population (2018): 72,847

Kansas's 8th Senate district is one of 40 districts in the Kansas Senate. It has been represented by Democrat Cindy Holscher since 2021.

== Geography ==
District 8 covers much of central Overland Park in the Johnson County suburbs of Kansas City.

The district is located entirely within Kansas's 3rd congressional district, and overlaps with the 8th, 16th, 22nd, 23rd, 29th, and 48th districts of the Kansas House of Representatives. At 20.4 square miles, it is tied with the 25th district for smallest Senate district in the state.

== Recent election results from statewide races ==
Year	U.S. President	U.S. Senator	Governor	Attorney General
2008	McCain (R): 53.1 – 45.7%	[Data unknown/missing]	—	—
2012	Romney (R): 57 – 41.1%	—	—	—
2016	Clinton (D): 46.1 – 45.1%	Moran (R): 54.4 – 41%	—	—
2018	—	—	Kelly (D): 56.8 – 36.4%	Swain (D): 51.9 – 48.1%
2020	Biden (D): 56.8% – 43.2%	Bollier (D): 53.8% – 41.6%	—	—

== Recent election results ==
=== 2020 ===
2020 Kansas Senate election, District 8
Party	Candidate	Votes	%
Democratic	Cindy Holscher	23,686	54.4
Republican	James Todd	19,883	45.6
Total votes		43,569	100
Democratic gain from Republican			

=== 2016 ===
2016 Kansas Senate election, District 8
Party	Candidate	Votes	%
Republican	Jim Denning (incumbent)	19,847	52.8
Democratic	Don McGuire	17,758	47.2
Total votes		37,605	100
Republican hold			

=== 2012 ===
2012 Kansas Senate election, District 8
Primary election
Party	Candidate	Votes	%
Republican	Jim Denning	4,796	60.3
Republican	Tim Owens (incumbent)	3,161	39.7
Total votes		7,957	100
General election
Republican	Jim Denning	19,484	54.3
Democratic	Lisa Johnston	16,398	45.7
Total votes		35,882	100
Republican hold			
