= Kansas's 13th Senate district =

American legislative district

Kansas's 13th State Senate district
Senator
Tim Shallenburger; R–Baxter Springs
- Demographics: 88% White; 2% Black; 4% Hispanic; 1% Asian; 1% Native American; 4% Other
- Population (2018): 70,933

Kansas's 13th Senate district is one of 40 districts in the Kansas Senate. It has been represented by Republican Tim Shallenburger since his 2023 appointment to replace fellow Republican Richard Hilderbrand.

== Geography ==
District 13 covers Cherokee County, Crawford County, and parts of Bourbon and Labette Counties in the southeastern corner of the state. Communities in the district include Pittsburg, Fort Scott, Baxter Springs, Columbus, Galena, Frontenac, and Girard.

The district is located entirely within Kansas's 2nd congressional district, and overlaps with the 1st, 2nd, 3rd, 4th, and 7th districts of the Kansas House of Representatives. It borders the states of Missouri and Oklahoma.

== Recent election results ==
=== 2020 ===
2020 Kansas Senate election, District 13
Party	Candidate	Votes	%
Republican	Richard Hilderbrand (incumbent)	19,990	66.0
Democratic	Nancy Ingle	10,299	34.0
Total votes		30,289	100
Republican hold			

=== 2018 special ===
In 2017, 13th district incumbent Jake LaTurner was appointed Kansas State Treasurer, and Cherokee County Commissioner Richard Hilderbrand was chosen to replace him. Because the next regular election would not be held for another 3 years, Hilderbrand had to run in a special election in 2018 to serve the remainder of the term.

2018 Kansas Senate special election, District 13
Party	Candidate	Votes	%
Republican	Richard Hilderbrand (incumbent)	12,836	54.8
Democratic	Bryan Hoffman	9,310	39.8
Libertarian	Sam Habjan	1,261	5.4
Total votes		23,407	100
Republican hold			

=== 2016 ===
2016 Kansas Senate election, District 13
Party	Candidate	Votes	%
Republican	Jake LaTurner (incumbent)	15,737	56.2
Democratic	Lynn Grant	12,291	43.8
Total votes		28,028	100
Republican hold			

=== 2012 ===
2012 Kansas Senate election, District 13
Primary election
Party	Candidate	Votes	%
Republican	Jake LaTurner	3,857	57.3
Republican	Bob Marshall (incumbent)	2,879	42.7
Total votes		6,736	100
General election
Republican	Jake LaTurner	16,621	60.6
Democratic	Gene Garman	10,805	39.4
Total votes		27,426	100
Republican hold			

=== Federal and statewide results ===
Year	Office	Results
2020	President	Trump 66.3 – 31.4%
2018	Governor	Kobach 51.2 – 41.9%
2016	President	Trump 64.3 – 29.8%
2012	President	Romney 57.2 – 40.5%
