= Lusk (surname) =

Lusk is a surname. Notable people with the name include:

- Andrew Lusk (1810–1909), Scottish businessman and liberal politician
- Anna Hartwell Lusk (1870–1968), American socialite
- Bob Lusk (1932–2022), American football player
- Clayton R. Lusk (1872–1959), American politician from New York State
- Clyde T. Lusk (1932–2014), U.S. Coast Guard admiral
- Damon Lusk (born 1977), American stockcar racer
- Daniel Lusk (born 1938), American poet and writer
- Dewey Lusk (born 1962), American college football coach
- Don Lusk (1913–2018), American animator and director
- Doris Lusk (1916–1990), New Zealand artist
- Professor Eddie Lusk (1948–1992), American Chicago blues musician
- Gene Lusk (1920–1969), American politician
- George Lusk (1839–1919), British chair of the Whitechapel Vigilance Committee
- Georgia Lee Lusk (1893–1971), American first female U.S. Congressional representative from New Mexico
- Graham Lusk (1866–1932), American physiologist and nutritionist
- Hall S. Lusk (1883–1983), American jurist
- Harold Lusk (1877–1961), New Zealand cricketer
- Henry Lusk (born 1972), American football player
- Herb Lusk (1953–2022), American football player
- Hugh Lusk (1837–1926), New Zealand politician
- Hugh Lusk (cricketer) (1866–1944), New Zealand cricketer and lawyer
- Jacob Lusk (born 1987), American singer
- Janet Lusk (1924–1994), Scottish social worker
- Jayson Lusk (born 1974), American economist
- Jeremy Lusk (1984–2009), American freestyle motocross racer
- Kaitlyn Lusk, American singer
- Marie Koupal Lusk (1862–1929), American painter
- Nancy Lusk (born 1953), American politician
- Newell Lusk (1875–1956), New Zealand cricketer
- Paul Lusk (born 1971), American baseball head coach
- Rich Lusk, American theologian and minister
- Robert Lusk (1781–1845), Irish presbyterian minister
- Robert Martin Lusk (1851–1913), American politician and judge
- Ryan Lusk (born 1984), Canadian stock car racer
- Stanislav Lusk (1931–1987), Czech rower
- Virgil Lusk, American lawyer and politician
- William Thompson Lusk (1838–1897), American obstetrician and soldier
