= Meltzer =

Meltzer is a surname of German or Yiddish origin, meaning "malt or beer maker".

Notable people with the surname include:

- Albert Meltzer (1920–1996), British anarcho-communist activist and writer
- Allan Meltzer (1928–2017), American economist
- Anne Meltzer, American seismologist
- Bernard Meltzer (1916–1998) American radio host
- Brad Meltzer (born 1970), American author
- Carolyn C. Meltzer, American neuroradiologist, nuclear medicine physician, and academic administrator
- Daniel Meltzer (1951–2015), Professor of Law at Harvard
- Dave Meltzer (born 1961), American sports journalist
- David Meltzer (1937–2016), American poet and musician
- David J. Meltzer (born 1955), North American archaeologist
- Donald Meltzer (1922–2004), American/British psychoanalyst
- Eli Meltzer (born 1979), American musician and entertainer
- Ewald Meltzer (1869–1940), German asylum director
- Françoise Meltzer (born 1947), American professor of religion
- Fredrik Meltzer (1779–1855), Norwegian businessman and politician
- Harold Meltzer (born 1966), American composer
- Isser Zalman Meltzer (1870–1953), Lithuanian Orthodox rabbi
- Jamie Meltzer, American film director
- Marlyn Meltzer (1922–2008), one of the original programmers for the ENIAC computer
- Milton Meltzer (1915–2009), American historian
- Richard Meltzer (born 1945), American musician and rock music critic
- Robert H. Meltzer (1921–1987), American painter
- Rose Meltzer, American bridge player
- Roza Pomerantz-Meltzer (died 1934), first woman elected to the Parliament of Poland
- Samuel James Meltzer (1851–1920), Russian/American physiologist
- Toby Meltzer (born 1957), American plastic and reconstructive surgeon

== See also ==
- Meltzer, Indiana
- Meltzer Woods, Indiana
- Meltzer's triad
- Melzer (disambiguation)
- Melzer
