= Janice Hardenburger =

American politician

Member of the Kansas Senate from the 21st district
- In office 1993–2000
- Preceded by: Don Montgomery
- Succeeded by: Mark Taddiken

Personal details
- Born: February 26, 1932 Haddam, Kansas
- Died: August 31, 2000 Fairbury, Nebraska
- Party: Republican
- Spouse: William Joseph Hardenburger

Janice Congleton Hardenburger (February 26, 1932–August 31, 2000) was an American politician who spent eight years in the Kansas State Senate.

Hardenburger was born in Haddam, Kansas, and lived there throughout her service in the State Senate. She married William Joseph Hardenburger in 1952 and the couple jointly operated a farm. Hardenburger successfully ran for State Senate in 1992, and was re-elected in 1996. She chaired the Senate Committee on Elections and Local Government. In the summer of 2000, she dropped out of her re-election race following a diagnosis of lung cancer; she died of the disease in late August.
