= Donald Montgomery (disambiguation) =

Donald Montgomery (1808–1893) was a member of the Canadian Senate during the 19th century.

Donald Montgomery can also refer to:

- Donald E. Montgomery (1896–1957), American economist and labor activist
- Donald Montgomery (educator) (1848–1890), Canadian educator and politician from Prince Edward Island
- Don Montgomery (1931–2020), American state legislator and member of the Kansas state senate
