= Barbara A. Horwitz =

American physiologist

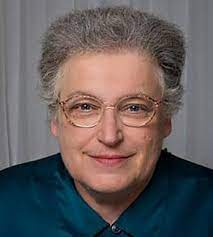
- Education: University of Florida; Emory University
- Awards: Lifetime Mentor Award from the American Association for the Advancement of Science; Distinguished Scientist of the Society for Experimental Biology & Medicine
- Scientific career
- Fields: physiology, nutritional science, metabolism, pharmacology, neurobiology
- Workplaces: University of California, Davis
- Website: https://biology.ucdavis.edu/people/barbara-horwitz

Barbara A. Horwitz is an American cellular physiologist whose work focuses on metabolism. In particular, her research has centered on the neural and hormonal regulation of energy balance.

Horwitz joined the University of California, Davis first as a postdoctoral scholar and then as an assistant professor. Her teaching, mentorship and leadership in supporting historically marginalized communities in academia have earned her numerous campus and national awards.

== Education and early life ==
After obtaining her B.S. in biology with highest honors (1961) and an M.S. in biology (1962) from the University of Florida, Horwitz pursued a Ph.D. in physiology at Emory University in 1966. She then pursued postdoctoral work at the University of California, Los Angeles on a fellowship in physiology. In 1972, she joined UC Davis faculty as an assistant professor and was later promoted to professor in 1978. In 1991, Horwitz became chair of the Department of Animal Physiology in the Division of Biological Sciences and became the first woman to receive the UC Davis Prize for Teaching and Scholarly Achievement. When this department transformed into the Section of Neurobiology, Physiology, and Behavior in 1993, she served as its first chair.

== Research ==
Horwitz has published over 200 research articles across a diverse range of scientific fields including: physiology, nutritional science, neurobiology, pharmacology, and metabolism. She is well known for her research on brown adipose tissue and its major roles in thermogenesis during hibernation and senescence. Much of her lab's research has been focused on elucidating the underlying genetic, neuronal, and hormonal processes that regulate mammalian thermogenesis and hibernation. In addition, Horwitz and collaborators have conducted studies on the cellular mechanisms involved in obesity, neuroplasticity, and aging.

== Major contributions to science and academia ==
Horwitz is the co-director of the Initiative for Maximizing Student Development (IMSD) Program at UC Davis which supports underrepresented minority graduate students pursuing Ph.D.'s in the biomedical and behavioral sciences. This program, funded by the National Institutes of Health (NIH), serves to create a more diverse pool of emerging scientists and helps underrepresented minority graduate students develop the professional skills necessary to successfully enter their respective fields. In addition, Horwitz also served as the vice provost for Academic Personnel at UC Davis from 2001 to 2007, Interim Provost and Executive Chancellor from 2007 to 2009, and vice provost for Academic Personnel from 2009 to 2011. During that time, she helped develop and launch the MyInfoVault (MIV) Academic Affairs database which consolidates academic personnel information in order to streamline processing and review. Horwitz has consistently been an advocate for junior faculty members at UC Davis and has actively worked to demystify the systems within academia by creating an online frequently asked questions page to help guide new faculty members through their academic careers. In recognition of her numerous contributions to UC Davis, a tribute to Horwitz was given at the Spring New-Emeriti Distinguished Lectures series in 2023. She has also served as President of both the American Physiology Society and the Society for Experimental Biology and Medicine (SEBM), and is an elected fellow of the American Association for the Advancement of Science (AAAS) and the American Physiology Society.

== Awards and recognition ==
- Lifetime Mentor Award from the American Association for the Advancement of Science (2015)
- Chancellor's Achievement Awards for Diversity and Community (2014)
- Ray G. Daggs Award, American Physiological Society (2012)
- Distinguished Scientist of the Society for Experimental Biology & Medicine (2010)
- Bodil Schmidt-Nielson Distinguished Mentor and Scientist Award (2007)
- President, American Physiological Society (2002–03)
- President, Society for Experimental Biology and Medicine (2001–03)
- American Physiological Society Arthur C. Guyton Physiology Teacher of the Year (1996)
- University of California Presidential Award for Excellence in Fostering Undergraduate Research (1995)
- UC Davis Prize for Teaching & Scholarly Achievement (1991)
- Academic Senate Distinguished Teaching Award, UC Davis (1982)
