= Greg Smith (Kansas politician) =

American politician

Member of the Kansas Senate from the 21st district
- In office January 14, 2013 – January 9, 2017
- Preceded by: Mark Taddiken
- Succeeded by: Dinah Sykes

Member of the Kansas House of Representatives from the 22nd district
- In office January 10, 2011 – January 14, 2013
- Preceded by: Lisa Benlon
- Succeeded by: Nancy Lusk

Personal details
- Born: October 8, 1959 (age 66) Emporia, Kansas, U.S.
- Party: Republican
- Spouse: Missy Smith
- Children: Kelsey (deceased), 4 others
- Education: Avila University; Johnson County Community College

Greg Smith (born October 8, 1959) is a former Republican member of the Kansas Senate, representing the 21st district from 2013 to 2017. Previously he was a member of the Kansas House of Representatives, representing District 22 from 2011 to 2013. He is the father of the murdered Kelsey Smith and created the Kelsey Smith Foundation to remember her.
