= Mark Taddiken =

American politician

Member of the Kansas Senate from the 21st district
- In office January 8, 2001 – January 14, 2013
- Preceded by: Janice Hardenburger
- Succeeded by: Greg Smith

Personal details
- Born: January 27, 1950 (age 76) Clay Center, Kansas, U.S.
- Party: Republican
- Spouse: Debra
- Children: 3
- Education: Fort Hays State University

Mark Taddiken (January 27, 1950) is a former Republican member of the Kansas Senate, representing the 21st district from 2001 until 2013. He has also been a member of the Clay County Extension Council since 1997.

== Committee assignments ==
Taddiken serves on these legislative committees:

- Agriculture (chair)
- Joint Committee on Energy and Environmental Policy
- Financial Institutions and Insurance
- Natural Resources
- Utilities
- Ways and Means

== Major donors ==
Some of the top contributors to Taddiken's 2008 campaign, according to the National Institute on Money in State Politics:

Kansas Republican Senatorial Committee, Kansas Contractors Association, QC Holdings, Kansas Association of Realtors, Senate Republican Leadership Committee of Kansas

Financial, insurance and real estate companies were his largest donor group, followed by political parties.
