= Society for Experimental Biology and Medicine =

Nonprofit scientific society

- Abbreviation: SEBM
- Formation: 1903
- Type: Nonprofit organization
- Purpose: Research
- Headquarters: Washington, D.C.
- Location: 3220 N Street NW #179, Washington, DC, 20007
- Members: >1,600 (2004)
- President: Stephania A. Cormier
- President-Elect: Clinton Allred
- Past President: Thomas Thompson
- Treasurer: Jian Feng
- Key people: Graham Lusk (co-founder)
- Main organ: Experimental Biology and Medicine
- Website: www.sebm.org

The Society for Experimental Biology and Medicine (abbreviated SEBM) is a nonprofit scientific society dedicated to promoting research in the biomedical sciences.

== Founding ==
The SEBM was founded in 1903, after Samuel J. Meltzer proposed founding a society dedicated to experimental biology and medicine. Meltzer then teamed up with Graham Lusk to invite eight New York scientists to a conference at Lusk's home, where they discussed the possibility of founding a biomedical society. At the conference, the attendees uniformly agreed to appoint a committee for a permanent society.

== Journal ==
The SEBM's official journal is Experimental Biology and Medicine (EBM), published by Frontiers Media. It was founded in 1904 as the Proceedings of the Society for Experimental Biology and Medicine, and obtained its current name in 2001.
