= Lusk =

Lusk may refer to:

== Places ==
=== U.S. places ===
- Lusk, Missouri, an unincorporated community
- Lusk, Tennessee, an unincorporated community
- Lusk, Wyoming, a town

=== Elsewhere ===
- Lusk, County Dublin, a village in Ireland

== Others ==
- Lusk (surname)
- Lusk (band), American psychedelic rock supergroup
- Lusk Committee of the New York State legislature, 1919
