= Charlotte Cunningham-Rundles =

American physician

Charlotte Cunningham-Rundles, an American physician, is the David S. Gottesman Professor of Immunology at the Mount Sinai School of Medicine in New York City. a specialist in primary immunodeficiency disorders. She is also director of the Immunodeficiency Clinic at Mount Sinai Hospital, and the program director of their Allergy Immunology Fellowship training program.

== Education ==
Cunningham-Rundles grew up in North Carolina, the daughter of Dr. Wayne Rundles and Professor Mary Alice Cunningham-Rundles. She graduated from Duke University in 1965 with a bachelor's degree in zoology. She received a M.D, in 1969 from the Columbia University College of Physicians and Surgeons, completed in 1972 her internship and residency at Bellevue Hospital in New York City, and received a Ph.D. in immunology in 1974 from New York University School of Medicine,

== Career ==
She specializes in allergy and immunology. She worked as the director of the immunodeficiency clinic at Sloan-Kettering Memorial Hospital until she moved to Mount Sinai Hospital in 1986. She is currently the David S. Gottesman Professor of Immunology at the Mount Sinai School of Medicine in New York. She is also a professor of medicine and pediatrics at Mount Sinai School of Medicine and a member of the Immunology institute. She is the director of the Immunodeficiency Clinic at Mount Sinai, where she treats patients with primary immunodeficiency disorders. She also does important drug research related to immunodeficiency disorders. And, she is the director of the Allergy Immunology Fellowship training program. According to her Mt Sinai hospital profile,"Rundles is an expert in the more than 150 Primary Immune Deficiency diseases, conditions that result from genetic defects of the immune system." Rundle has earned the Clinical Immunology Society President's Award, the Boyle Award Immune Deficiency Foundation award, the Abbott Award from the American Society for Microbiology due to her notable contributions to research in Immunology. She received the 2024 Joachim Hilfenhaus Award from the Plasma Protein Therapeutics Association (PPTA) for her contribution to the field of immunology on April 16.

Memberships, societies, and committees

She is a fellow of

- the American Federation for Clinical Research,
- the American College of Physicians,
- the American Association of Asthma, Allergy and Immunology, where she is chair of the research committee.

She is a member of

- American Board of Internal Medicine
- American Association of Immunologists
- Clinical Immunology Society, (secretary treasurer, 1994–1999, elected councilor, 1999, publications chair; president, 2003–2004)
- European Society for Immune Deficiency
- The Mucosal Immune Society
- The Harvey Society
- The Henry Kunkel Society
