= Melzer =

Melzer (German, derived from Mälzer, meaning "malter") is an occupational surname. Notable people with the surname include:

- Benjamin Melzer (born 1987), model
- Gerald Melzer (born 1990), Austrian tennis player
- Hagen Melzer (born 1959), German long-distance runner
- Heiko Melzer (born 1976), German politician
- Iveta Benešová (known professionally as Iveta Melzer; born 1983), Czech tennis player
- Jean Melzer (1926–2013), Australian senator
- Johanna Melzer (1904-1960), German politician
- Jürgen Melzer (born 1981), Austrian tennis player
- Manfred Melzer (1944–2018), German bishop
- Nils Melzer (born 1970), Swiss academic and author
- Richard Melzer (born 1979), American basketball player
- Václav Melzer (1878–1968), Czech mycologist
- Werner Melzer (born 1954), German footballer
