= Nyssodrysternum decoratum =

Scientific classification
- Kingdom: Animalia
- Phylum: Arthropoda
- Class: Insecta
- Order: Coleoptera
- Suborder: Polyphaga
- Infraorder: Cucujiformia
- Family: Cerambycidae
- Genus: Nyssodrysternum
- Species: N. decoratum

Binomial name
- Nyssodrysternum decoratum Monne, 1992

Species of beetle

Nyssodrysternum decoratum is a species of beetle in the family Cerambycidae. It was described by Monne in 1992.
