= Anna Hartwell Lusk =

- Born: January 8, 1870; New York City, U.S.
- Died: August 21, 1968 (aged 98); Guilford, Connecticut, U.S.
- Parent(s): William Thompson Lusk; Mary Hartwell Chittenden Lusk
- Relatives: Graham Lusk (brother); Simeon B. Chittenden (grandfather)

Anna Hartwell Lusk (January 8, 1870 – August 21, 1968) was an American socialite during the Gilded Age.

== Early life ==
Anna Hartwell Lusk was born in New York City on January 8, 1870, the daughter of Prof. William Thompson Lusk and Mary Hartwell (née Chittenden) Lusk.

Her mother died, aged 31, when Anna was 1 year old. A 13-day-old sister, Lily Adams Lusk, died in September 1871, a year and a half after Anna's birth. Chittenden Memorial Library at Yale University was built in honor of Anna's mother. Among her surviving siblings were elder brother was Dr. Graham Lusk (a physiologist and nutritionist), who married Mary Woodbridge Tiffany (a daughter of Louis Comfort Tiffany); Mary Elizabeth Lusk, who married journalist and author Cleveland Moffett; and Dr. William Chittenden Lusk, who, like Anna, did not marry. Her father was an Adjutant-General in the United States Volunteers during the Civil War.

Her maternal grandparents were Mary Elizabeth (née Hartwell) Chittenden (Note: Mary Elizabeth (née Hartwell) Chittenden (1815–1852), was the daughter of Sherman Hartwell, himself the nephew of American founding father Roger Sherman and his first wife, Elizabeth (née Hartwell) Sherman.) and U.S. Representative Simeon B. Chittenden. Her paternal grandparents were Sylvester Graham Lusk and Elizabeth Freeman Lusk (née Adams).

== Society life ==
In 1892, Anna, listed as "Miss Lusk", was included in Ward McAllister's "Four Hundred", purported to be an index of New York's best families, published in The New York Times. Conveniently, 400 was the number of people that could fit into Mrs. Astor's ballroom.

In 1907, Lusk purchased land from the Paul Smith Hotel Company and hired architect Grosvenor Atterbury to design a "camp" for her, in the Queen Anne style, on Upper St. Regis Lake in New York's Adirondack mountains, adjoining the camp of her brother, known as "Camp Comfort" in Brandreth Park. The camp, which was opened in 1908, "[was to] be one of the most elaborate and extensive of the entire chain of lakes" and featured a two-story living hall with a "monumental fieldstone fireplace." Anna sold the camp to Dr. and Mrs. A. S. Chase of New York around 1921.

== Personal life ==
Lusk, who did not marry, died at age 98 in Guilford, Connecticut, where she had lived for many years, on August 21, 1968. She was buried in Woodlawn Cemetery in the Bronx.
