= Spandau 4 =

State electoral district of Germany

- Electoral district for the Berlin House of Representatives
- Spandau 4 in 2026
- District: Spandau
- Electorate: 31,088 (2026)

Current electoral district
- Party: CDU
- Member: Heiko Melzer

Spandau 4 is an electoral constituency (German: Wahlkreis) represented in the House of Representatives of Berlin. It elects one member via first-past-the-post voting.

== Geography ==
The constituency comprises the areas of Staaken, and Falkenhagener Feld/South, within the borough of Spandau.

There were 31,088 eligible voters in 2026.

== Members ==
Election	Member	Party	%
1999	Almut Mommert	CDU	53.8
2001	Burgundy Great	SPD	40.4
2006	Burgundy Great	SPD	37.9
2011	Heiko Melzer	CDU	44.1
2016	Heiko Melzer	CDU	30.4
2021	Heiko Melzer	CDU	31.5
2023	Heiko Melzer	CDU	45.3
2026	Heiko Melzer	CDU	29.5

== Election results ==
=== 2026 election ===
State election (2026): Spandau 4
Notes:	Blue background denotes the winner of the electorate vote. Pink background denotes a candidate elected from their party list. Yellow background denotes an electorate win by a list member, or other incumbent. A ✓ or ✗ denotes status of any incumbent, win or lose respectively.						
Party	Candidate	Votes	%	±%	Party votes	%	±%
CDU	✓ Heiko Melzer	6,279	29.5	▼15.8	5,890	27.5	▼16.4
AfD	Robert Mickley	4,915	23.1	▲11.7	5,085	23.7	▲12.4
SPD	Marco Rumza	3,438	16.2	▼6.9	3,181	14.8	▼6.3
Left	Hanna Lena Krüger	2,749	12.9	▲9.7	2,868	13.4	▲9.9
Greens	Leif Sporleder	1,451	6.8	▼0.5	1,570	7.3	▼0.4
Tierschutzpartei	Jan Pfeiffer	805	3.8	Steady	731	3.4	▲0.2
BSW	Cornelius Gellert	787	3.7		894	4.2	
FDP	Dominik Hamann	587	2.8	▼0.8	662	3.1	▼1.0
Volt	Marie Breinl	269	1.3		259	1.2	▲0.8
PARTEI					166	0.8	▼0.3
PdF					71	0.3	
ÖDP					27	0.1	Steady
du.					15	0.1	Steady
SGP					11	0.1	Steady
DKP					8	0.0	Steady
Informal votes		497			339		
Total valid votes		21,280			21,438		
Turnout		21,777	70.0	▲10.2			
CDU hold	Majority	1,364	6.4	▼15.9			

=== 2023 repeat election ===
Changes denoted below for the 2023 election are compared to the 2016 election, as the 2021 election was declared invalid.

State election (2023): Spandau 4
Notes:	Blue background denotes the winner of the electorate vote. Pink background denotes a candidate elected from their party list. Yellow background denotes an electorate win by a list member, or other incumbent. A ✓ or ✗ denotes status of any incumbent, win or lose respectively.						
Party	Candidate	Votes	%	±%	Party votes	%	±%
CDU	✓ Heiko Melzer	8,305	45.3	▲14.9	8,048	43.9	▲16.8
SPD	Hannah Erez-Hübner	4,221	23.0	▼7.1	3,886	21.2	▼5.8
AfD	Andreas Scheil	2,095	11.4	▼5.7	2,079	11.3	▼5.8
Greens	Maurice Lange	1,333	7.3	▲0.6	1,424	7.8	▲0.3
Tierschutzpartei	Susanne Fischer	696	3.8		588	3.2	▲0.7
FDP	Sabine Znanewitz	658	3.6	▼3.0	755	4.1	▼2.8
Left	Lars Leschewitz	587	3.2	▼2.8	639	3.5	▼2.8
PARTEI	Erik Brähmer	248	1.4		193	1.1	▲0.1
Gray Panthers					106	0.6	▼0.8
The Grays					102	0.6	
dieBasis	Richard Reich	118	0.6		78	0.4	
Volt					70	0.4	
Team Todenhöfer					69	0.4	
Independent	Lucia Bunte	60	0.3				
Pirates					49	0.3	▼1.0
Verjüngungsforschung					47	0.3	▼0.1
Mieterpartei					40	0.2	
FW					36	0.2	
ÖDP					22	0.1	
Bildet Berlin!					22	0.1	
NPD					19	0.1	▼0.4
Humanists					19	0.1	
du.					18	0.1	
DKP					9	0.0	Steady
LKR					8	0.0	▼0.4
Klimaliste					7	0.0	
The Pinks/Alliance 21					7	0.0	
BüSo					6	0.0	Steady
Bergpartei, die ÜberPartei					5	0.0	
SGP					2	0.0	▼0.1
Informal votes		215			171		
Total valid votes		18,321			18,353		
Turnout		18,550	59.9	▼6.3			
CDU hold	Majority	4,084	22.3				

=== 2021 election (annulled) ===
The election in 2021 was annulled and rerun in 2023.

State election (2021): Spandau 4
Notes:	Blue background denotes the winner of the electorate vote. Pink background denotes a candidate elected from their party list. Yellow background denotes an electorate win by a list member, or other incumbent. A ✓ or ✗ denotes status of any incumbent, win or lose respectively.						
Party	Candidate	Votes	%	±%	Party votes	%	±%
CDU	✓ Heiko Melzer	6,892	31.2	▲0.8	6,570	29.9	▲2.8
SPD	Hannah Erez-Hübner	6,407	29.0	▼1.1	5,844	26.6	▼0.4
AfD	Andreas Scheil	2,378	10.8	▼6.3	2,304	10.5	▼6.6
Greens	Maurice Lange	1,962	8.9	▲2.2	2,018	9.2	▲1.8
FDP	Sabine Znanewitz	1,641	7.4	▲0.8	1,701	7.7	▲0.8
Tierschutzpartei	Susanne Fischer	1,006	4.6		597	2.7	▲0.2
Left	Lars Leschewitz	948	4.3	▼1.7	1,014	4.6	▼1.6
PARTEI	Erik Brähmer	391	1.8		288	1.3	▲0.3
Team Todenhöfer					235	1.1	
dieBasis	Richard Reich	352	1.6		219	1.0	
APT					179	0.8	
FW					176	0.8	
Gray Panthers					168	0.8	▼0.6
The Grays					167	0.8	
Independent	Lucia Bunte	109	0.5				
Volt					83	0.4	
Pirates					67	0.3	▼1.0
Verjüngungsforschung					60	0.3	▼0.1
Mieterpartei					50	0.2	
Humanists					47	0.2	
du.					35	0.2	
Bildet Berlin!					29	0.1	
NPD					28	0.1	▼0.4
ÖDP					26	0.1	
The Pinks/Alliance 21					25	0.1	
LKR					16	0.1	▼0.4
Klimaliste					12	0.1	
Bergpartei, die ÜberPartei					10	0.0	
BüSo					9	0.0	Steady
SGP					4	0.0	Steady
DKP					3	0.0	▼0.1
Informal votes		402			302		
Total valid votes		22,086			21,984		
Turnout		22,684	72.2	▲6.0			
CDU hold	Majority	485	2.2				

== See also ==
- Politics of Berlin
- House of Representatives of Berlin
