= Nyssodrysternum diopticum =

Scientific classification
- Kingdom: Animalia
- Phylum: Arthropoda
- Class: Insecta
- Order: Coleoptera
- Suborder: Polyphaga
- Infraorder: Cucujiformia
- Family: Cerambycidae
- Genus: Nyssodrysternum
- Species: N. diopticum

Binomial name
- Nyssodrysternum diopticum (Bates, 1864)

Species of beetle

Nyssodrysternum diopticum is a species of beetle in the family Cerambycidae. It was described by Bates in 1864.

== Habitat ==
The Nyssodrysternum diopticum is native to South America and specimens have been taken from Bolivia and Ecuador.
