= Harvey Society =

Organization in New York City

- Formation: 1905
- Founded at: New York City
- Key people: William Harvey; Graham Lusk; Simon Flexner; George B. Wallace; Frederick S. Lee

The Harvey Society or Harvey Society of New York is a learned society based in New York City, Named after the British scientist William Harvey (1578–1657), its scope is "the diffusion of knowledge of the medical sciences". Since 1905, the society sponsors an annual series of lectures given by biomedical researchers from institutions mainly in North America.

== History ==
On 1 April 1905 a group of 13 prominent New York physicians and scientists met at 9 East 74th Street in the residence of physiologist Graham Lusk. Also in attendance was John J. Abel, a pharmacologist from the Johns Hopkins University School of Medicine. Their intention was to form a society which would forge a "closer relationship between the purely practical side of medicine and the results of laboratory investigation" by organizing a lecture series which would be open to physicians, scientists, and the general public.

The society's first meeting took place on October 7, 1905 in the Academy of Medicine with a lecture on the theory of narcosis by Hans Horst Meyer, Professor of Pharmacology at the University of Vienna. According to the New York Times, it was delivered in German. However, The English version of the lecture was printed in the society's first book of 13 lectures published in 1906 by J. B. Lippincott & Co.

== Founding officers and members ==
The society's founding officers were:

- Graham Lusk, President
- Simon Flexner, Vice President
- George B. Wallace, Secretary
- Frederick S. Lee, Treasurer

Other founding members included

- Samuel James Meltzer
- William H. Park
- Edward K. Dunham
- James Ewing
- Christian Herter
- Theodore C. Janeway
- Phoebus A. Levene
- Eugene Lindsay Opie

== Lectures ==
Since its founding in 1905, the society sponsors an annual series of lectures given by leading biomedical researchers. The lectures are published in book form at the end of the year. The society's seven annual lectures are now held at Rockefeller University's Caspary Auditorium.

In briefly reviewing the first 25 years of the Harvey Society Lectures, Rufus Cole wrote in 1930:

The Harvey Society Lectures do not deal with any single phase of human biological phenomena. They represent a sort of symposium in which workers from various fields of science report their results. In choosing the lecturers, however, the attempt is made to bring together men who have some interest in the problems of human disease, though it is realized that at times this interest may be very remote.

In 2005 for the one hundredth anniversary of the society, there was a "Centennial Symposium." At the end of the day, Commissioner of Health of the City of New York presented the New York City Proclamation for "Harvey Society Day".

== Other notable medical associations named after William Harvey ==
The Harveian Society of Edinburgh was founded in 1782 by Dr Andrew Duncan. The Society holds an annual Festival in honour of Harvey in the Royal College of Physicians of Edinburgh. At the annual Festival, an oration is given by the President to commemorate Harvey's life and work.

The Harveian Society of London is a medical society founded in 1831 based in The Medical Society of London, Chandos Street, in Cavendish Square.

The Royal College of Physicians of London holds an annual lecture established by William Harvey in 1656 called the Harveian Oration.

The Harvey Club of London, the oldest medical club in Canada, was founded in 1919 and is based in the University of Western Ontario.

== See also ==
- Harveian Oration
- Harveian Society of Edinburgh
- Harveian Society of London
