= Nyssodrysternum borneanum =

Scientific classification
- Kingdom: Animalia
- Phylum: Arthropoda
- Class: Insecta
- Order: Coleoptera
- Suborder: Polyphaga
- Infraorder: Cucujiformia
- Family: Cerambycidae
- Genus: Nyssodrysternum
- Species: N. borneanum

Binomial name
- Nyssodrysternum borneanum (Breuning, 1970)

Species of beetle

Nyssodrysternum borneanum is a species of beetle in the family Cerambycidae. It was described by Breuning in 1970.
