= Nyssodrysternum rodens =

Scientific classification
- Kingdom: Animalia
- Phylum: Arthropoda
- Class: Insecta
- Order: Coleoptera
- Suborder: Polyphaga
- Infraorder: Cucujiformia
- Family: Cerambycidae
- Genus: Nyssodrysternum
- Species: N. rodens

Binomial name
- Nyssodrysternum rodens (Bates, 1864)

Species of beetle

Nyssodrysternum rodens is a species of beetle in the family Cerambycidae. It was described by Bates in 1864.
