= Nyssodrysternum amparense =

Scientific classification
- Kingdom: Animalia
- Phylum: Arthropoda
- Clade: Pancrustacea
- Class: Insecta
- Order: Coleoptera
- Suborder: Polyphaga
- Infraorder: Cucujiformia
- Family: Cerambycidae
- Genus: Nyssodrysternum
- Species: N. amparense

Binomial name
- Nyssodrysternum amparense (Melzer, 1934)

Species of beetle

Nyssodrysternum amparense is a species of beetle in the family Cerambycidae. It was described by Melzer in 1934. It is found in Brazil (Mato Grosso do Sul, Bahia, Espírito Santo, Rio de Janeiro, São Paulo, Paraná), Paraguay (Caacupe, Paraguarí) and Argentina (Salta).
