= Nyssodrysternum striatellum =

Scientific classification
- Kingdom: Animalia
- Phylum: Arthropoda
- Class: Insecta
- Order: Coleoptera
- Suborder: Polyphaga
- Infraorder: Cucujiformia
- Family: Cerambycidae
- Genus: Nyssodrysternum
- Species: N. striatellum

Binomial name
- Nyssodrysternum striatellum (Tippmann, 1960)

Species of beetle

Nyssodrysternum striatellum is a species of beetle in the family Cerambycidae. It was described by Tippmann in 1960.
