= Nyssodrysternum fasciatum =

Scientific classification
- Kingdom: Animalia
- Phylum: Arthropoda
- Clade: Pancrustacea
- Class: Insecta
- Order: Coleoptera
- Suborder: Polyphaga
- Infraorder: Cucujiformia
- Family: Cerambycidae
- Genus: Nyssodrysternum
- Species: N. fasciatum

Binomial name
- Nyssodrysternum fasciatum Gilmour, 1960

Species of beetle

Nyssodrysternum fasciatum is a species of beetle in the family Cerambycidae. It was first described by Elphinstone Forrest Gilmour in 1960.
