= Dinah Sykes =

American politician (born 1977)

Minority Leader of the Kansas Senate
- Incumbent
- Assumed office January 11, 2021
- Preceded by: Anthony Hensley

Member of the Kansas Senate from the 21st district
- Incumbent
- Assumed office January 9, 2017
- Preceded by: Greg Smith

Personal details
- Born: April 10, 1977 (age 49) Tennessee, U.S.
- Party: Republican (before 2018); Democratic (2018–present)
- Spouse: Jeffrey
- Children: 2
- Education: Trevecca Nazarene University (BA)

Dinah Sykes (born April 10, 1977) is an American politician who has served in the Kansas Senate from the 21st district since 2017. Since 2021, Sykes has served as the Minority Leader of the Kansas Senate.

== Career ==
Sykes earned a bachelor's degree in business administration from Trevecca Nazarene University. She was a stay-at-home mom and personal chef before entering politics. Sykes also served as a PTA president before being elected to the Kansas Senate.

Sykes was first elected to the Kansas Senate as a Republican in November 2016. In December 2018, Sykes switched to the Democratic Party along with three other female Kansas legislators—Senator Barbara Bollier, Representative Joy Koesten, and Representative Stephanie Clayton.

In December 2020, Sykes was elected by the Senate Democratic Caucus to be Minority Leader of the Kansas Senate.

In January 2026, she announced her candidacy for state insurance commissioner.

== See also ==
- List of American politicians who switched parties in office

Kansas Senate
Preceded by Anthony Hensley	Minority Leader of the Kansas Senate; 2021–present	Incumbent
