= Experimental Biology and Medicine (Frontiers journal) =

- Discipline: Biology, medicine
- Language: English
- Edited by: Nicola Conran

Publication details
- Former names: Proceedings of the Society for Experimental Biology and Medicine
- History: 1903–present
- Publisher: Frontiers Media on behalf of the Society for Experimental Biology and Medicine
- Frequency: Continuous
- Open access: Yes
- License: CC BY
- Impact factor: 2.8 (2023)

Standard abbreviations
- ISO 4: Exp. Biol. Med. (Maywood)

Indexing
- CODEN: EBMMBE
- ISSN: 1535-3702 (print); 1535-3699 (web)
- LCCN: 2001252015
- OCLC no.: 45699954

Links
- Journal homepage; Online access; Submissions

Experimental Biology and Medicine is a peer-reviewed scientific journal that covers experimental biological and medical research. The editor-in-chief is Nicola Conran (University of Campinas). It was established in 1903 as Proceedings of the Society for Experimental Biology and Medicine and is published, as of January 2024, by Frontiers Media on behalf of the Society for Experimental Biology and Medicine. The journal acquired its current name in 2001.

== Abstracting and indexing ==
The journal is abstracted and indexed in Scopus and the Science Citation Index Expanded. According to the Journal Citation Reports, the journal has a 2023 impact factor of 2.8.
