= Don Montgomery =

American politician (1931–2020)

Member of the Kansas Senate from the 21st district
- In office 1981–1992
- Succeeded by: Janice Hardenburger

Personal details
- Born: July 23, 1931
- Died: December 7, 2020
- Party: Republican

Donald L. Montgomery (July 23, 1931–December 7, 2020) was an American politician who spent three terms in the Kansas State Senate, serving from 1981 to 1992.
