= Nyssodrysternum caudatum =

Scientific classification
- Kingdom: Animalia
- Phylum: Arthropoda
- Class: Insecta
- Order: Coleoptera
- Suborder: Polyphaga
- Infraorder: Cucujiformia
- Family: Cerambycidae
- Genus: Nyssodrysternum
- Species: N. caudatum

Binomial name
- Nyssodrysternum caudatum (Bates, 1864)

Species of beetle

Nyssodrysternum caudatum is a species of beetle in the family Cerambycidae. It was described by Bates in 1864.

The species is known to be native to regions in South America, particularly cited from Amazonas, Brazil.
