= J. Hyatt Smith =

American politician

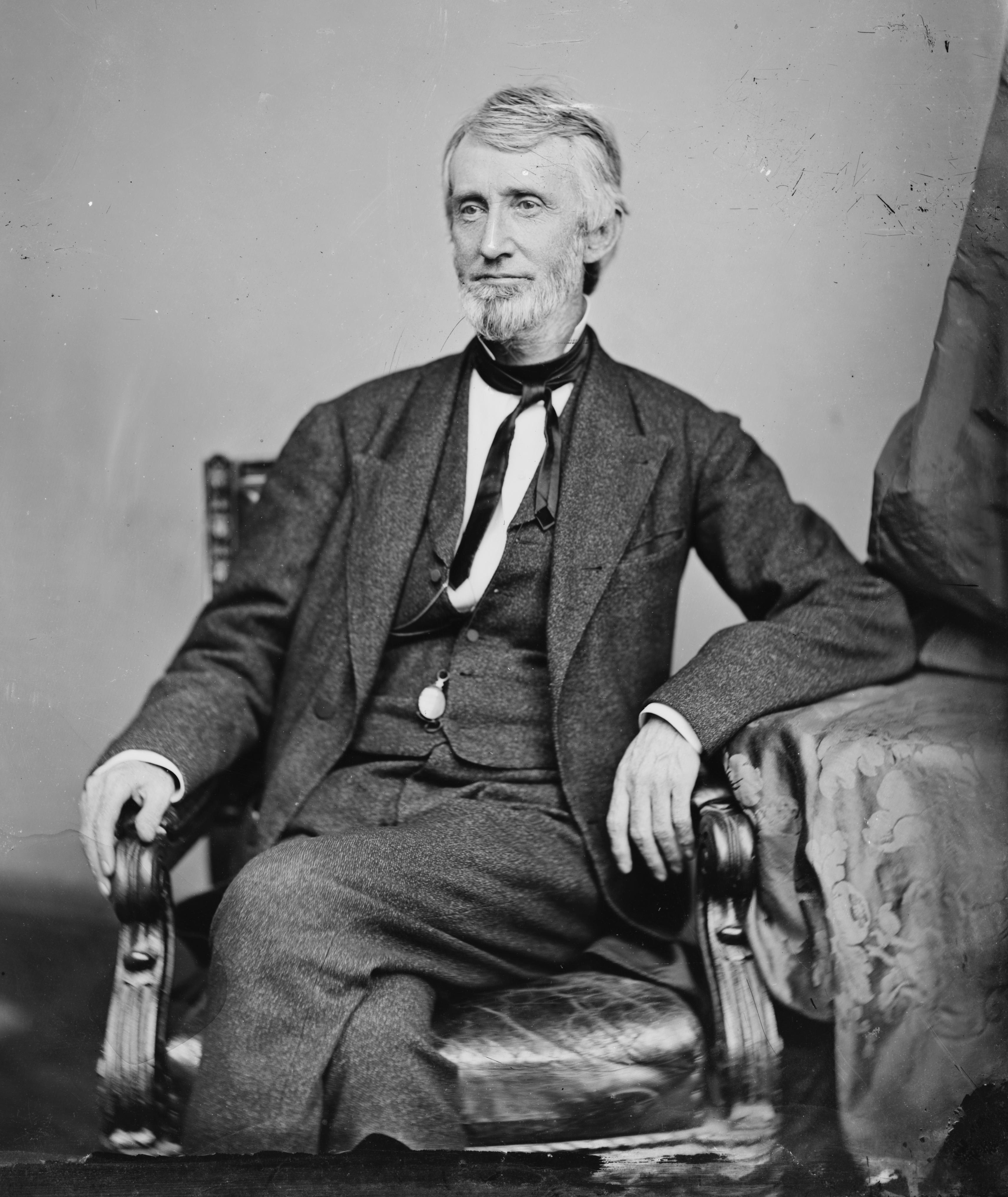

Member of the U.S. House of Representatives from New York's 3rd district
- In office March 4, 1881 – March 3, 1883
- Preceded by: Simeon B. Chittenden
- Succeeded by: Derwin R. James

Personal details
- Born: John Hyatt Smith; April 10, 1824 Saratoga, New York, U.S.
- Died: December 7, 1886 (aged 62) Brooklyn, New York, U.S.
- Party: Independent

John Hyatt Smith (April 10, 1824 – December 7, 1886) was a United States representative from New York.

== Biography ==
Born in Saratoga, he was taught by his father and employed for a time as a clerk in Detroit and later as a bank clerk in Albany, New York; while in the latter position he studied theology. After ordination his first pastorate was in Poughkeepsie in 1848. He officiated in Cleveland, Ohio for three years, in Buffalo from 1855 to 1860, and in Philadelphia from 1860 to 1866. During the Civil War he served in Virginia with the United States Christian Commission in 1862, and was chaplain of the Forty-seventh Regiment, National Guard of New York, in 1869. He continued his ministerial duties in Brooklyn from 1866 to 1880, and was elected as an independent candidate to the Forty-seventh Congress, holding office from March 4, 1881 to March 3, 1883. He appointed by President Chester A. Arthur a commissioner to inspect the Pacific Railroad, after which he resumed a pastorate in Brooklyn. He died there in 1886; interment was in Green-Wood Cemetery.

U.S. House of Representatives
Preceded by Simeon B. Chittenden	Member of the U.S. House of Representatives from New York's 3rd congressional district 1881–1883	Succeeded by Darwin R. James
