= Nyssodrysternum nitidum =

Scientific classification
- Kingdom: Animalia
- Phylum: Arthropoda
- Class: Insecta
- Order: Coleoptera
- Suborder: Polyphaga
- Infraorder: Cucujiformia
- Family: Cerambycidae
- Genus: Nyssodrysternum
- Species: N. nitidum

Binomial name
- Nyssodrysternum nitidum Monne & Tavakilian, 2011

Species of beetle

Nyssodrysternum nitidum is a species of beetle in the family Cerambycidae. It was described by Monne and Tavakilian in 2011.
