= Nyssodrysternum spilotum =

Scientific classification
- Kingdom: Animalia
- Phylum: Arthropoda
- Class: Insecta
- Order: Coleoptera
- Suborder: Polyphaga
- Infraorder: Cucujiformia
- Family: Cerambycidae
- Genus: Nyssodrysternum
- Species: N. spilotum

Binomial name
- Nyssodrysternum spilotum Monne, 1975

Species of beetle

Nyssodrysternum spilotum is a species of beetle in the family Cerambycidae. It was described by Monne in 1975.
