= Nyssodrysternum =

Scientific classification
- Kingdom: Animalia
- Phylum: Arthropoda
- Class: Insecta
- Order: Coleoptera
- Suborder: Polyphaga
- Infraorder: Cucujiformia
- Family: Cerambycidae
- Tribe: Acanthocinini
- Genus: Nyssodrysternum

Genus of beetles

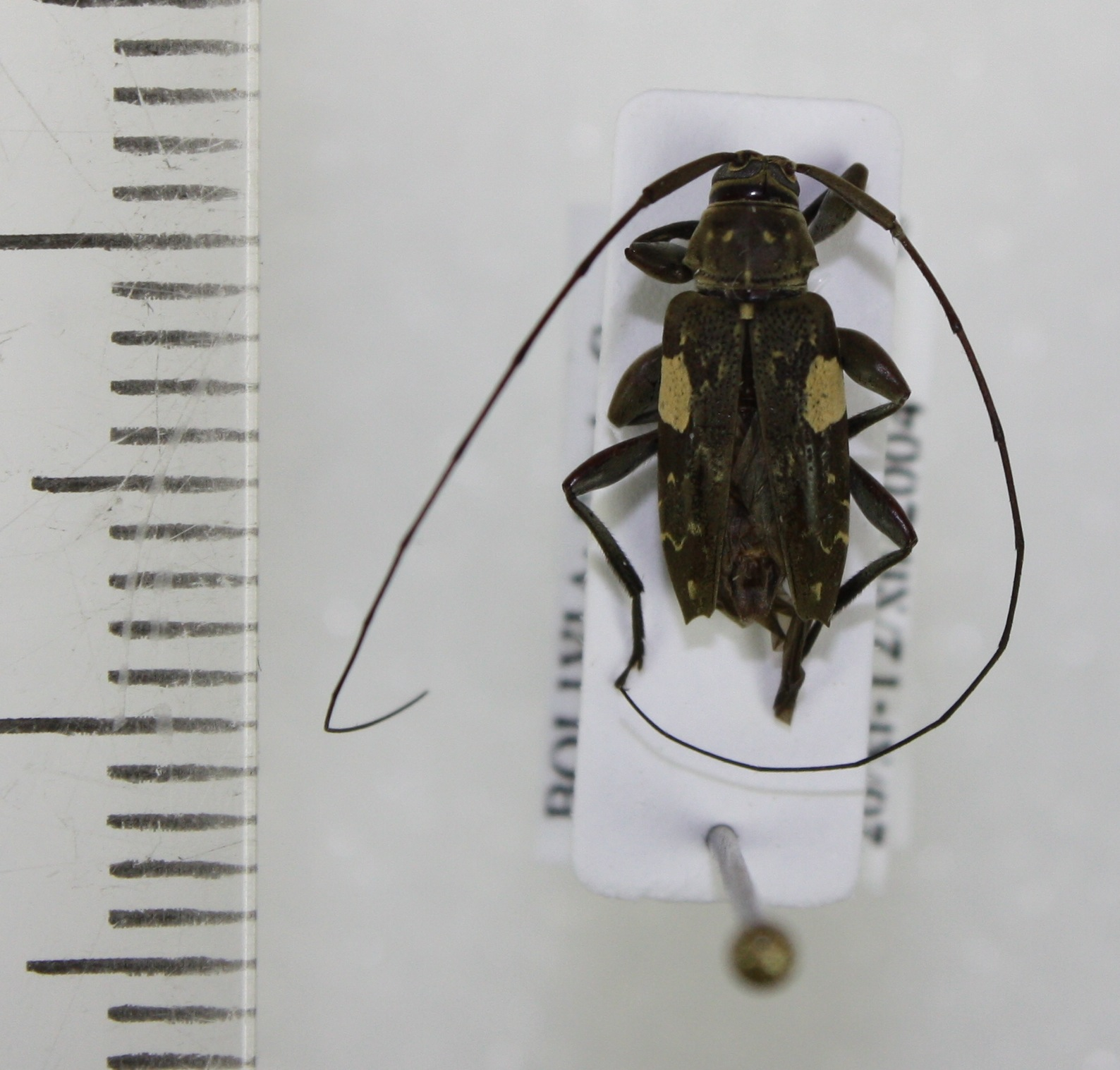
Nyssodrysternum conspicillare

Nyssodrysternum is a genus of beetles in the family Cerambycidae, containing the following species:

- Nyssodrysternum amparense (Melzer, 1934)
- Nyssodrysternum analogum Monne & Tavakilian, 2011
- Nyssodrysternum basale (Melzer, 1934)
- Nyssodrysternum bolivianum Monne & Tavakilian, 2011
- Nyssodrysternum borneanum (Breuning, 1970)
- Nyssodrysternum capixaba Monne & Tavakilian, 2011
- Nyssodrysternum caudatum (Bates, 1864)
- Nyssodrysternum cingillum Monne, 2009
- Nyssodrysternum colombianum Monne & Tavakilian, 2011
- Nyssodrysternum conspicillare (Erichson, 1847)
- Nyssodrysternum conspicuum Monné, 1985
- Nyssodrysternum cotopaxi Monne & Tavakilian, 2011
- Nyssodrysternum cretatum Monné, 1985
- Nyssodrysternum decoratum Monné, 1992
- Nyssodrysternum diopticum (Bates, 1864)
- Nyssodrysternum efflictum (Bates, 1864)
- Nyssodrysternum fasciatum Gilmour, 1960
- Nyssodrysternum flavoguttatum Monne & Tavakilian, 2011
- Nyssodrysternum flavolineatum Monné, 1985
- Nyssodrysternum freyorum (Gilmour, 1963)
- Nyssodrysternum fulminans (Bates, 1864)
- Nyssodrysternum gilvolineatum Monne & Tavakilian, 2011
- Nyssodrysternum gratum Monné, 1985
- Nyssodrysternum hovorei Monne & Tavakilian, 2011
- Nyssodrysternum impensum Monné, 1985
- Nyssodrysternum instabile Monné, 1992
- Nyssodrysternum insulorum Monne & Tavakilian, 2011
- Nyssodrysternum lanceolatum Monne & Tavakilian, 2011
- Nyssodrysternum laterale (Melzer, 1931)
- Nyssodrysternum lepidum Monné, 1992
- Nyssodrysternum lineolatum (Bates, 1864)
- Nyssodrysternum multilineatum Monne & Tavakilian, 2011
- Nyssodrysternum nitidum Monne & Tavakilian, 2011
- Nyssodrysternum ocellatum (Bates, 1885)
- Nyssodrysternum picticolle (Melzer, 1934)
- Nyssodrysternum pictulum (Bates, 1881)
- Nyssodrysternum plaumanni Monné, 1992
- Nyssodrysternum poriferum (Bates, 1885)
- Nyssodrysternum promeces (Bates, 1864)
- Nyssodrysternum propinquum (Bates, 1864)
- Nyssodrysternum proximum Monne & Tavakilian, 2011
- Nyssodrysternum ptericoptum (Bates, 1864)
- Nyssodrysternum reticulatum (Melzer, 1934)
- Nyssodrysternum rodens (Bates, 1864)
- Nyssodrysternum rubiginosum Monné, 1975
- Nyssodrysternum schmithi (Melzer, 1931)
- Nyssodrysternum serpentinum (Erichson, 1847)
- Nyssodrysternum signiferum (Bates, 1864)
- Nyssodrysternum simulatum (Bates, 1864)
- Nyssodrysternum spilotum Monné, 1975
- Nyssodrysternum stillatum (Bates, 1864)
- Nyssodrysternum striatellum (Tippmann, 1960)
- Nyssodrysternum sulphurescens (Bates, 1885)
- Nyssodrysternum taeniatum Monné, 1985
- Nyssodrysternum tucurui Monne & Tavakilian, 2011
- Nyssodrysternum univittis (Bates, 1885)
- Nyssodrysternum vanini Monne & Tavakilian, 2011
- Nyssodrysternum variabile Monné, 1985
- Nyssodrysternum zonatum Monné, 1985
