= Walter Duddins =

German politician (1903–1945)

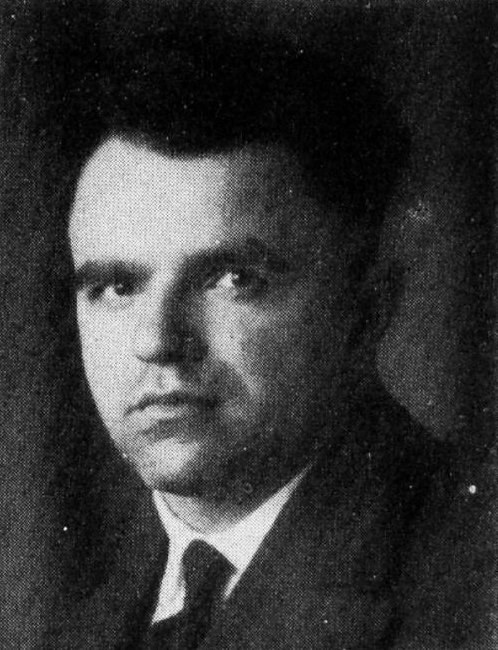
- Duddins c. 1928
- Born: 20 May 1903; Königsberg, East Prussia, German Empire
- Died: 1945 (aged 41–42); In a Soviet labour camp in the Königsberg / Kaliningrad region
- Occupations: Political activist Party official Politician; Member of the Prussian parliament Resistance activist/organiser
- Political party: Spartacus League; KPD
- Partner: Johanna Melzer (1904-1960)

Walter Duddins (20 May 1903 – 1945) was a German Communist Party activist and politician.

== Life ==
=== Provenance and early years ===
Walter Duddins was born at Königsberg in East Prussia. He was only 6 when his father, a teacher, died. After 1909 he was brought up by foster parents. Upon leaving school he undertook an apprenticeship as a machinist and used his qualification to work in Königsberg, then relocated at some stage (possibly in 1922) to Dortmund, which meant moving from the extreme eastern side of the German Empire to the extreme west. The Ruhr region, with Dortmund at its heart, was politically important, in part because it was still one of the country's largest and most dynamic industrial regions.

=== Young communist ===
Duddins was only 14 years old when in 1917 he joined the Socialist Youth Movement. The next year he joined the so-called Spartacus League, founded in 1914 by activist members of the Social Democratic Party of Germany (SPD) who had been appalled by the failure of the SPD parliamentary leadership to oppose the launch of the war and their subsequent decision to support funding of the war with the party's parliamentary votes. Despite having been regarded as a minority group of anti-militarist eccentrics in 1914, by 1918 the slaughter of war and the desperate austerity inflicted on the home front had led to increasing support for the Spartacus League between 1916 and 1918. At a congress held in Berlin between 30 December 1918 and 2 January 1919 the Spartacists provided the leadership for the founding of the Communist Party of Germany (KPD). Duddins was a founding member. Within less than a month the party's two most high-profile leaders, Karl Liebknecht and Rosa Luxemburg, had been murdered. However, the KPD drew encouragement from the October Revolution (Note: According to the Gregorian calendar used in western Europe the October Revolution took place in November 1917. However, in the Russian Empire the Julian calendar was used. According to the Julian calendar the October revolution took place in October 1917.) in Russia. Between 1918 and 1922 Duddins worked as a party youth official in East Prussia. He also served during 1921/22 as a member of the party leadership team ("Bezirksleitung") for the region.

In 1922, now aged 19 Duddins was appointed regional youth secretary for the Ruhr region. In 1923 he was expelled from the party for “alleged [unspecified] irregularities”, however. This also meant the loss of his job within the party's national organisation structure. At a period of intense internal fractional wrangling over the soul and the future of the recently launched Communist Party, this was not an unusual experience for Communist Party activists. He was subsequently rehabilitated. Between 1925 and 1933 Walter Duddins lived in Dortmund and (between 1930 and 1932) in Erfurt with Johanna Melzer (1904-1960), who would be commended by admirers after 1945 for having avoided betraying comrades under torture during Nazi rule, despite spending more than ten of those years in a series of prisons. Walter Duddins is believed to have died in a Soviet labour camp in 1945.

Between 1925 and 1932, Duddins lived with fellow activist Johanna Melzer, who later wrote that Duddins had a larger influcence over her political awakening.

=== Party promotions and prison ===
In January 1926, following his “rehabilitation” by the party leadership, Duddins was appointed Party Secretary for the Duisburg sub-region. He then served, between 1927 and 1929, as Party Secretary for the Bochum region. Although his personal convictions drew him towards comrades such as Kurt Landau and Anton Grylewicz of the party's ”Trotskyite” left-wing opposition faction, when the inevitable split occurred, he remained loyal to the Stalinist party line represented by the German party leadership under Ernst Thälmann. In 1927 Duddins was sentenced to six months in prison for “Widerstand gegen die Staatsgewalt” (‘’loosely, ”resisting state authority”’’). A year later, in March 1928, he was sentenced to an eighteen month period if detention in a low-security "fortress prison" following conviction under a charge of “Zersetzung der Schutzpolizei” (‘’loosely, “degrading the regional security police”’’).

=== Parliamentarian ===
In May 1928 Duddins was elected to membership of the Prussian Landtag (state parliament), representing the Communist Party in the “Westphalia-South” electoral district, for which he was the third candidate on the party list. He was re-elected in 1932, this time for the Erfurt electoral district. He continued to serve as a member of the Prussian parliament till the abolition of democracy during 1933). He also worked as regional party secretary for the Dortmund sub-region from 1930. Shortly after taking on the Dortmund party secretaryship, as the polarisation of politics spilled onto German streets in the Great Depression after the Wall Street crash, Duddins was subject to an assassination attempt by Ernst Röhm's Nazi paramilitaries. Notwithstanding the failure of the attempt to kill him, by the end of 1930 he had relocated to Erfurt, serving between 1930 and 1932 as “Polleiter” (loosely, "Head of Party Policy") for the Thüringen district.

=== Régime change ===
In January 1933, shrewdly exploiting parliamentary deadlock in the national Reichstag (parliament), Hitler's National Socialist Party took power and the country was rapidly transformed into a one-party dictatorship. Political opposition activism became illegal, with well-documented Communist politicians among the first to be targeted by the security services for persecution or elimination. Many of the top party officials were arrested or fled abroad, heading for Prague, Paris or Moscow. Others stayed behind, determined to continue their political work even if it meant living “underground” – avoiding registration with any local cist hall, and relocating frequently to keep a step ahead of the security services. Duddins was one of those she stayed in Germany He was sent to the “Wasserkante” region surrounding Hamburg to organise “illegal work” on behalf of the party.

=== Arrest and detention ===
Six months after the Hitler take-over, the authorities caught up with him and Duddins was arrested during July 1933. He appears to have spent slightly more than a year in pretrial detention, before facing trial on 10 August 1934 at the recently established special “people's court”, configured by the authorities to specialise in political prosecutions. He was sentenced to a three year jail term, of which under the German system still in place he will have been deemed already to have served slightly more than a year by the time of his trial and conviction. Johanna Melzer, described by this stage as “his former wife”, was also arrested in July 1933, but released later. She was re-arrested in August 1934 and in 1935 convicted on a charge of high treason. Her death sentence was subsequently commuted to a fifteen year jail term.

=== Later years ===
During 1936 Walter Duddins completed his prison sentence and in November he was transferred to the Sachsenhausen labour camp near Berlin. According to reports that emerged in East Germany after 1945, in or before 1939 he renounced the Communist party and was released from the camp in August 1939. There is apparent inconsistency in the surviving reports of his final years. Records of a statement provided to East German party leaders by Johanna Melzer, who had lived with Duddins between 1925 and 1932, assert that Melzer's own political development (towards communism and anti-Hitler activism) could in large part be credited to Duddins. However, she also stated that at the start of August 1941, approximately six weeks after the launch of the German invasion of the Soviet Union, she had received a letter from Duddins who was writing from Königsberg. In the letter Duddins had spelled out the reasons for the unexpected development, and written with great enthusiasm of the actions undertaken by the Hitler army and his own wish to apply his own efforts to supporting the anti-Soviet cause. Melzer was reported, at this point, to have broken off all contact with Duddins. A very different picture emerges from a report attributed to a trusted and respected former Königsberg party official called Georg Spielmann. Spielmann reported that in March 1945 Duddins had saved him from arrest by the Gestapo and/or the military police which would have been followed by a court martial. Duddins had done this by making a false testimony under oath as to Spielmann presence with him in a machining department. Relatively uncontested is Melzer's statement that shortly after the Soviet invasion of 1945 Walter Duddins died of dysentery in a prisoner of war camp near Königsberg (renamed as Kaliningrad in 1946).
