= Nyssodrysternum reticulatum =

Scientific classification
- Kingdom: Animalia
- Phylum: Arthropoda
- Class: Insecta
- Order: Coleoptera
- Suborder: Polyphaga
- Infraorder: Cucujiformia
- Family: Cerambycidae
- Genus: Nyssodrysternum
- Species: N. reticulatum

Binomial name
- Nyssodrysternum reticulatum (Melzer, 1934)

Species of beetle

Nyssodrysternum reticulatum is a species of beetle in the family Cerambycidae. It was described by Melzer in 1934.
