= Nyssodrysternum cretatum =

Scientific classification
- Kingdom: Animalia
- Phylum: Arthropoda
- Class: Insecta
- Order: Coleoptera
- Suborder: Polyphaga
- Infraorder: Cucujiformia
- Family: Cerambycidae
- Genus: Nyssodrysternum
- Species: N. cretatum

Binomial name
- Nyssodrysternum cretatum Monne, 1985

Species of beetle

Nyssodrysternum cretatum is a species of beetle in the family Cerambycidae. It was described by Monne in 1985.
