= Nyssodrysternum freyorum =

Scientific classification
- Kingdom: Animalia
- Phylum: Arthropoda
- Class: Insecta
- Order: Coleoptera
- Suborder: Polyphaga
- Infraorder: Cucujiformia
- Family: Cerambycidae
- Genus: Nyssodrysternum
- Species: N. freyorum

Binomial name
- Nyssodrysternum freyorum (Gilmour, 1963)

Species of beetle

Nyssodrysternum freyorum is a species of beetle in the family Cerambycidae. It was described by Gilmour in 1963. 2426365450
