= Lisa Benlon =

American politician

Member of the Kansas House of Representatives from the 22nd district
- In office January 12, 2009 – January 10, 2011
- Preceded by: Sue Storm
- Succeeded by: Greg Smith

Member of the Kansas House of Representatives from the 17th district
- In office January 14, 1991 – January 13, 2003
- Preceded by: Jeff Freeman
- Succeeded by: Stephanie Sharp

Personal details
- Born: July 9, 1953 (age 73)
- Party: Democratic
- Other political affiliations: Republican
- Spouse: Randy

Lisa Benlon (July 9, 1953) is a former member of the Kansas House of Representatives, who represented the 22nd district. She served from 1991 to 2002 as a Republican. She then served as a Democrat from 2009 to 2011. Benlon ran for re-election in 2010, but was defeated by Republican Greg Smith.

Prior to her election to the House, Benlon served on the Shawnee City Council from 1988 to 1991. From 1973 to 1988 she worked as an accounting office manager.

Benlon is a volunteer with the Boy Scouts of American (1986–present) and has also served in the Lenexa Chamber of Commerce, Republican Women of Lexena, Shawnee Area Chamber of Commerce, and Young Men's Christian Association.

== Committee membership ==
- Economic Development and Tourism (Ranking Member)
- Taxation
- Joint Committee on Economic Development
- Federal and State Affairs committees.

== Major donors ==
The top 5 donors to Benlon's 2008 campaign:

- 1. Kansas Democratic Party $5,700
- 2. Benlon, Randy & Lisa $4,977
- 3. Kansans for Lifesaving Cures $1,000
- 4. Johnson County Democratic Central Cmte $1,000
- 5. Greater Kansas City Chamber of Commerce $1,000
