= Murder of Kelsey Smith =

2007 murder of American woman

Kelsey Ann Smith
- Born: May 3, 1989
- Died: June 2, 2007 (aged 18); Longview Lake, Missouri, U.S.
- Resting place: Johnson County Chapel and Memorial Gardens; 38°55′20.06″N 94°40′4.98″W
- Education: Shawnee Mission West
- Parent(s): Greg and Missey Smith
- Website: kelseysarmy.org

Kelsey Ann Smith (May 3, 1989 – June 2, 2007) was a teenager from Overland Park, Kansas who was abducted after concluding a shopping trip at Target on June 2, 2007, and was murdered that evening. The story was featured in the international media, including on America's Most Wanted, before her body was found near a lake in Missouri on June 6, 2007.

== Overview ==
Smith was last seen at 7:07 p.m. CDT on June 2, 2007, in the parking lot of a Target store at 97th and Quivira, behind Oak Park Mall in Overland Park, Kansas. Police, other authorities and the national media launched an extensive publicity campaign and search for Smith.

=== Abduction and investigation ===
Surveillance video from Target showed Smith purchasing a present for her boyfriend to celebrate six months together. Her last call had been to her mother from the store. She then left the store before she disappeared. Approximately four hours later, her car, a 1987 Buick Regal, was found abandoned outside of Macy's in the parking lot of Oak Park Mall across the street. Her purse, wallet and the items that she had bought were left in the car.

Target stores use a large array of video cameras, and these can often be enhanced internally through the company's Target Forensic Services division. The surveillance footage showed Smith parking her car, entering the store, calling her mother and selecting the items that were later found in the car. It also revealed that a male, who was white and in his early twenties, wearing a white shirt and dark shorts, had entered the store approximately thirty seconds after Smith had entered. The man seemed to be in every aisle that Smith had visited and appeared in almost every part of the footage showing her, but at a discreet distance. Despite frequently looking at Smith or in her direction, the man made no effort to talk to her or to approach her in the store but left just as she went to the cashier, who did not see or notice anything unusual in the store nor in Smith's behavior. The footage captured a clear picture of the man leaving the store.

In the parking lot, surveillance video appeared to show someone forcing Smith into her car. The video at first did not show anything unusual, but when slowed down, it revealed a flash in the direction of Smith and her car, consistent with someone running when the camera is placed at a distance. The outside footage showed a suspicious 1970s-era Chevrolet truck leaving the lot, which was also found to have entered the lot just before Smith had.

According to the program See No Evil (also known as Murder on CCTV), the Macy's surveillance video showed that Smith's car had been left there at 9:17 p.m., about two hours after it had departed the Target lot. A figure in white shirt and dark pants was seen leaving the vehicle and running toward the street. Though it was too dark at that time to determine if the figure was that of a male or female, the person's clothing seemed to match that of the suspect in the Target footage. When the video still of the man was released to the media, it generated hundreds of tips, but the leads were too general to be useful.

When the car was checked for forensic evidence, fingerprint experts isolated all of those who had legitimate reasons to be in the car, such as Kelsey's family, friends and boyfriend. As a result, they found unidentified prints on the seat belt.

=== Search ===
Detectives reportedly found Kelsey's body because of a cell phone ping that originated from the area on June 2, and a number of search areas were identified. Despite efforts by local law enforcement and eventually the FBI, it took Verizon Wireless four days to hand over the cell phone records to investigators, which caused much controversy over the delay. A Verizon technician pinpointed a cell-phone tower and told investigators to search 1.1 miles north of it. Within 45 minutes, on June 6 at 1:30 p.m., searchers discovered Smith's body in a wooded area near Longview Lake in Grandview, Missouri, 18 to 20 miles from where she had been abducted. Upon report of Smith's death, a website dedicated to the search for her went offline and was quickly remade into a dedication site. Through subsequent investigation, the cause of death was determined to be strangulation; she had been choked with her own belt. The autopsy also showed that she was sexually assaulted.

=== Perpetrator ===
A woman who had seen the footage recognized the subject as her neighbor. The next day when she saw the information about the truck, she called in a tip. On the evening of June 6, 2007, police arrested 26-year-old Edwin Roy "Jack" Hall of Olathe, Kansas. Hall was in the process of leaving town with his wife and son, supposedly on vacation, when the police arrived.

Hall was charged on June 7 with premeditated first-degree murder and aggravated kidnapping. He had no adult criminal record, but had a juvenile record of assault. Hall, who had been adopted at age seven, had been returned to state custody at age 15 after threatening the family's daughter with a knife. He also assaulted another boy by striking him on the head with a baseball bat. Police do not believe that Hall knew Smith. At the time of his arrest, Hall was married and the father of a four-year-old son. Hall admitted to being at Target but claimed that he had never approached Smith. However, he was caught in a lie when his fingerprints matched those from the seat belt.

Hall was arraigned via video hookup on June 7, and bond was set at US$5 million. On August 1, Hall was indicted by a Johnson County, Kansas, grand jury for murder, rape and aggravated sodomy. The charges made Hall eligible for the death penalty, which Johnson County district attorney Phill Kline decided to seek.

Because the body had been found in a different state (Missouri), some argued for federal jurisdiction; but because Hall was arrested and in custody in Johnson County, that jurisdiction had the legal authority to pursue the case.

On July 23, as part of a plea agreement, Hall pleaded guilty to all four charges. His plea came during what was supposed to be a change-of-venue hearing. The courtroom was jammed with Smith's parents and other family members, friends and reporters. The hearing was carried live on all four of Kansas City's television network affiliates.

It is believed that Hall spotted Smith driving into the Target parking lot after he had arrived. He noticed that she was alone and thus began following her inside the store to assure himself that she was not meeting anyone. When he saw her about to leave, he went to his truck and retrieved his gun. He waited until Smith was most vulnerable, when she was getting ready to leave, before he struck. He took her 20 miles away to the Missouri woods, where he sexually assaulted and strangled her.

The hearing came a day after a judge ruled that prosecutors could still seek the death penalty for Hall after a judge had denied a defense motion seeking dismissal of the case on a technicality.

On September 16, Johnson County district judge Peter V. Ruddick sentenced Hall to life in prison without parole for the kidnapping, rape and murder. In court, Hall apologized to Smith's family for his actions.

Hall is incarcerated in the Lansing Correctional Facility, located in Lansing, Kansas.

== Kelsey Smith Act ==
Some believe that Verizon Wireless was reluctant to locate or "ping" the cell phone because of privacy laws governing such actions. At the time, cell-phone service providers would generally comply upon the request of the subscriber, but not of anyone else, including that of law enforcement authorities. The exception was a court order being issued, which takes time.

This led to the passing of the Kelsey Smith Act by Congress in February 2021, a law that states in essence that cell-phone companies can ping a phone if authorities determine that the subscriber is in danger. Congress debated federalizing it.

In at least one instance, the law was acted upon. In February 2015, in Lenexa, Kansas, not far from where Smith had grown up, a man stole a car, unaware of a five-month-old infant inside. While in flight, he also ran down a pedestrian in a hit-and-run. The police found the car a half-hour later at a convenience store after having pinged the baby's mother's cell phone, which was still in a purse on the front seat. The driver escaped, and as of 2015 was still at large. It is believed that once he realized there was a baby inside, he decided to ditch the car.

== National media attention ==
Beyond local Kansas City news affiliate coverage, the case received prominent national media attention, including coverage by national news services Fox News Channel, CNN, MSNBC, Nancy Grace, the Today Show, The Mind of a Murderer and as an episode of the television show See No Evil, which aired in Canada on Slice, and in the United States on Investigation Discovery. Smith's story also aired on an episode of Final Moments on Investigation Discovery and also featured on “Murdered At First Sight”.

== See also ==
- List of kidnappings
- List of solved missing person cases (2000s)
