= William Thompson Lusk =

American obstetrician and soldier (1838–1897)

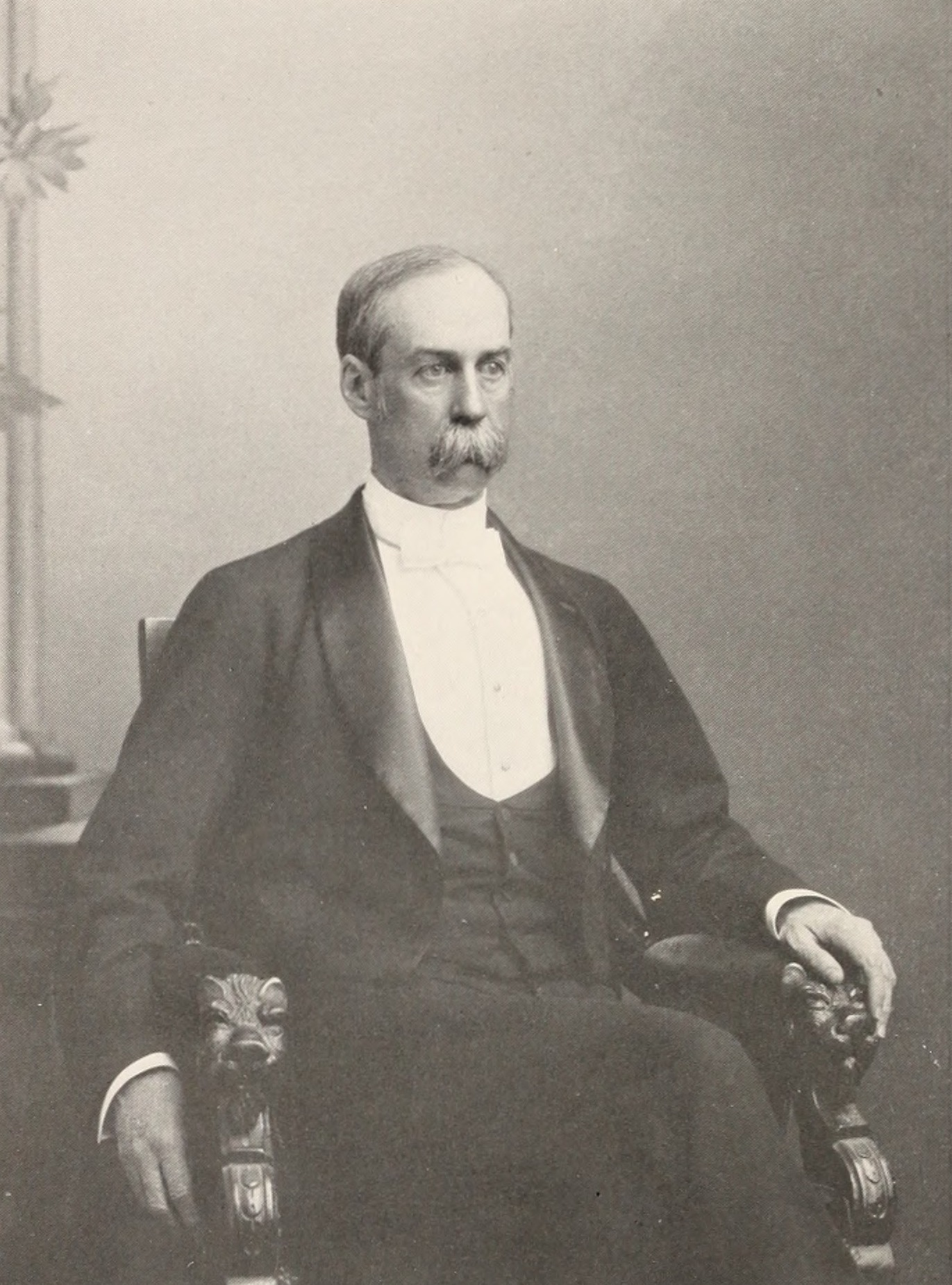
- Born: May 23, 1838; Norwich, Connecticut, U.S.
- Died: June 12, 1897 (aged 59); New York City, New York, U.S.
- Education: Russell's Military School; Yale University; University of Edinburgh; Heidelberg University; Humboldt University of Berlin
- Alma mater: Bellevue Hospital Medical College
- Children: 5 (including Anna Hartwell Lusk and Graham Lusk)
- Parent(s): Sylvester Graham Lusk; Elizabeth Freeman Adams Lusk

William Thompson Lusk (May 23, 1838 – June 12, 1897) was an American obstetrician and a soldier who rose to the rank of Assistant Adjutant-General in the United States Volunteers during the first three years of the American Civil War. After he retired from the Union Army, he finished his medical education and became a professor as well as a president of the Bellevue Hospital Medical College. He received much recognition and fame for his 1882 book, The Science and Art of Midwifery, which quickly became a widely referenced text.

== Early life ==
Lusk was born and raised in Norwich, Connecticut. Lusk, the fifth generation of his family, was the son of Sylvester Graham Lusk and Elizabeth Freeman Lusk (née Adams).

Lusk attended a school run by local Reverend Albert Spooner in preparation for attending Yale College. However, his uncle believed that learning the old version of grammar from Spooner would get Lusk rejected from Yale, and for the winter of 1853–1854, he attended Anthon's Grammar School at Murray Street, Manhattan, New York City. For the winter of 1854–1855, Lusk was sent by his mother to Russell's Military School in New Haven, Connecticut, to gain physical toughness through gymnastics.

In 1855, he enrolled at Yale University in the class of 1859, but left school at the end of his freshman year and studied medicine in Berlin and Heidelberg from 1858 to 1861.

== Career ==
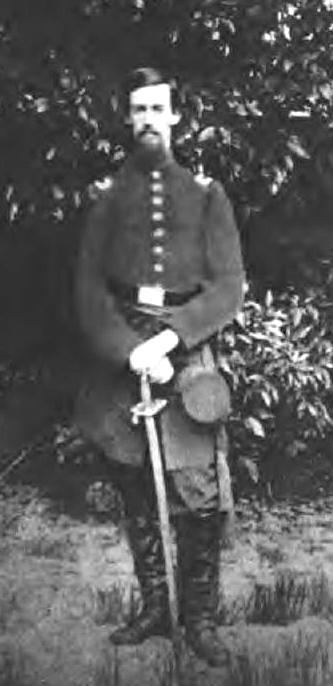
Captain William Thompson Lusk, Assistant Adjutant-General of the United States Volunteers

When the American Civil War broke out, he joined the 79th New York State Militia. He moved through the ranks from private to Assistant Adjutant General by 1863. Unusually for his time, Lusk did not practice the usual custom of vilifying of the Southern soldiers; his letters actually indicate that he respected the Southerners and spoke of "Yankee hordes" invading the Southerners' "splendid plantations". He was promoted to captain on February 24, 1862 (retroactive to January 19, 1862), and resigned from the United States Volunteers on February 28, 1863, with the intention of going back to New York to take command of a regiment. He was instead appointed Assistant Adjutant-General (with a rank of Captain) and assigned to the staff of Daniel Tyler on June 26, 1863, but resigned just two months later on September 17, 1863, after his troops were sent to Delaware and marked as inactive.

Lusk took part in engagements at Blackburn's Ford, First Bull Run, Port Royal, James Island, Second Bull Run, Antietam, Fredericksburg, and many other minor battles. He was also a staff officer of Isaac I. Stevens until Stevens' death, and he commanded two companies during the Draft Riots of 1863.

=== After war ===
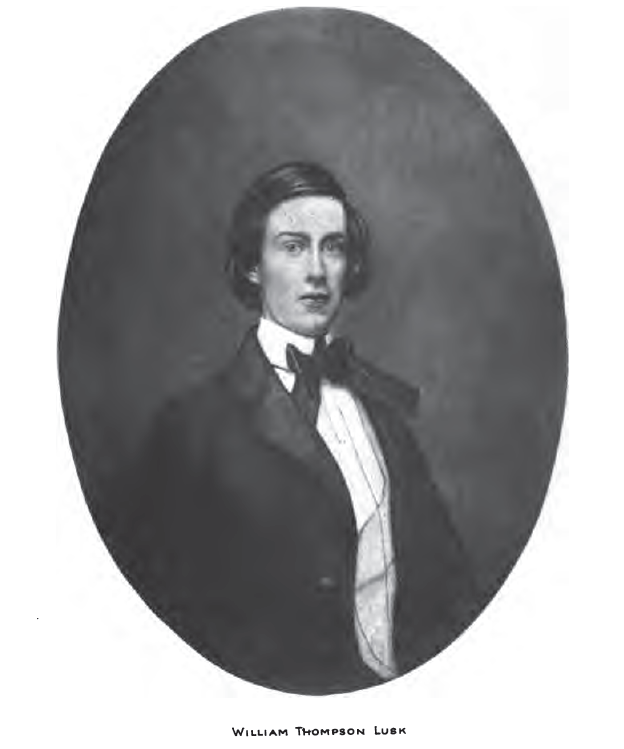
A portrait of William Thompson Lusk

After he left the war, he returned to Bellevue Hospital Medical College, where he finished medical school and received his M.D. in 1864. He was the valedictorian of his graduating class. After that he spent one year in Europe studying under various medical professionals, although his New York Times obituary lists this time period as having lasted 4 years. He studied in Edinburgh with James Y. Simpson, in Vienna with Carl Braun, and then in Prague with Seifert. Lusk came back to New York in 1868 to establish his practice.

On his return from Europe, Lusk was appointed Professor of Physiology at Long Island College Hospital. In the winter of 1871, on the invitation of Oliver Wendell Holmes Sr., Lusk moved to Boston to lecture on physiology at Harvard Medical School. Lusk was Professor of Obstetrics and Gynecology at Bellevue Hospital Medical College until his death after the previous seatholder, Dr. George T. Elliot, died.

At the same time as accepting the professorship, he also became co-editor of The Medical Journal, and held that position from 1871 to 1873, and also became a visiting physician at Bellevue Hospital. Just a few hours later, Harvard offered him a position, which he declined. In 1890, upon the hospital's consolidation with New York University Medical College, Lusk became President of Bellevue Hospital Medical College.

On October 5, 1886, Lusk joined New York Commandery of the Loyal Legion of the United States. He also joined George Washington Post, No. 103, Dept. New York, Grand Army of the Republic on March 17, 1887.

=== Medical work ===
Lusk wrote many medical papers, including his 1876 paper, Nature, Causes and Prevention of Puerperal Fever, which was one of the first papers to come out in support of germ theory. In 1882, he published The Science and Art of Midwifery. The book achieved great sales in America and England, and was translated into many languages, including French, Italian, Spanish, Arabic. It went through four editions, the last of which was practically a rewrite. Lusk was either planning to or in the process of writing a fifth edition when he died.

Lusk was also one of the first physicians to successfully perform a Caesarean section. In March 1887, Lusk performed the second Caesarian section in the United States where both the mother and child survived. By some time in 1888, he had already performed three fully successful Caesarian sections within the past year. Lusk was also a recognized authority on gynecology.

== Personal life ==
On May 4, 1864, after Lusk finished medical school, he was married to Mary Hartwell Chittenden (1840–1871), the only daughter of U.S. Representative Simeon B. Chittenden. In 1871, his wife and their infant daughter (Lily) both died. Lusk was left with two sons and two daughters to raise. Chittenden Memorial Library at Yale University was built in his wife's honor.

Five years after his first wife's death, Lusk remarried to Matilda (née Myer) Thore, with whom he had one daughter, Alice, who married the Canadian obstetrician and gynecologist John Clarence Webster. His second wife also predeceased him, with Maltida dying in 1892.

Lusk died, very suddenly and unexpectedly, of apoplexy at his residence, 47 East 34th Street in New York City, on June 12, 1897. He was survived by five children; two sons and two daughters from his first marriage and a daughter from his second. According to his obituary in the New York Times, he left a fortune of over three million dollars to his estate. At the time of his death, his eldest son was a Yale professor, and his younger son had just graduated from Yale in 1890.

=== Awards and honors ===
Lusk also received many other scientific awards and distinctions. These include:

- One of the founders of the State's and County's Medical Associations (1884)
- A significant president of the State's Medical Association (1889)
- Honorary fellow of the Obstetrical Society of London
- President of Faculty and Professor of Obstetrics and of the Diseases of Women and Children at Bellevue Medical College
- Consulting Physician to Bellevue Maternity Hospital (1870), Foundling Asylum, Emergency Hospital
- Gynecologist to the Bellevue and St. Vincent Hospitals
- Honorary Fellow of the Edinburgh and London Obstetrical Societies
- Corresponding Fellow of the Obstetrical Societies of Paris and Leipsic and Paris Academy of Medicine
- President of the American Gynecological Society
- President of the New York State Medical Association
- Vice-President of the New York Obstetrical Society (1873)
- President of the New York Obstetrical Society (1879)
- Honorary degree of LL.D. from Yale University (1884)
