= Nancy Lusk =

American politician

Member of the Kansas House of Representatives from the 22nd district
- In office January 14, 2013 – January 11, 2021
- Preceded by: Greg Smith
- Succeeded by: Lindsay Vaughn

Personal details
- Born: October 12, 1953 (age 72) Emporia, Kansas, U.S.
- Party: Democratic
- Spouse: James
- Children: 3

Nancy Niles Lusk (October 12, 1953) is an American politician who served as a member of the Kansas House of Representatives from 2013 to 2021. Lusk represented the 22nd district.
