= Daniel Lusk =

American poet (born 1938)

- Born: September 2, 1938; Charles City, Iowa, U.S.
- Education: Master's Degree University of South Dakota
- Occupations: American poet, writer, teacher
- Spouse: Angela Patten

Daniel Lusk (born September 2, 1938, in Charles City, Iowa) is an American poet, writer, editor, and teacher. He has authored eight collections of poetry, most recently Every Slow Thing (Kelsay Books, 2022) and Farthings (Yavankia Press, 2002). He lives in Burlington, Vermont, with his wife, Irish poet Angela Patten.

== Early life and education ==
He spent most of his childhood in Iowa before moving to South Dakota, where he worked as a sports writer, jazz singer, and ranch hand. From 1978 to 1983, Lusk did a weekly radio commentary on books that was syndicated on National Public Radio. In the same era, he led student-teacher workshops for the National Endowment for the Arts' Poets-in-the-Schools Program. After earning a master's degree at the University of South Dakota, Lusk was an administrator and lecturer in English at the University of Vermont.

== Literary work and honors ==
Daniel Lusk's poems have been published in many magazines and journals, including American Poetry Review, Appalachia, Beloit Poetry Journal, Chariton Review, The Comstock Review, Hayden's Ferry Review, Iowa Review, Kansas Quarterly, Laurel Review, The Louisville Review, New Letters, Nimrod, North American Review, North Dakota Quarterly, Off the Coast, Painted Bride Quarterly, Passages North, The Pinch, Poetry, Poetry Ireland, Prairie Schooner, South Dakota Review, and Southern Poetry Review. Lusk's poems have been reprinted in anthologies, including180 More Extraordinary Poems for Every Day, edited by Billy Collins, (2005); O Taste and See: Food Poems, edited by David Lee Garrison and Terry Hermsen (2003); and The Breath of Parted Lips II : Voices from the Robert Frost Place, edited by Sydney Lea (2004). The Breath of Parted Lips II was a finalist for the ForeWord Book of the Year (2004) and the Independent Publisher Book Award for Anthologies (2005).

Lusk's early poetry collections include Wild Onions (published as Winter Promises - Wild Onions, with Mark Vinz, BkMk Press, 1975); Cow Wars (Nightshade Press, 1995); and Kissing the Ground: New & Selected Poems (Onion River, 1999).

The poetry collection Lake Studies: Meditations on Lake Champlain (2011) and its companion audiobook The Inland Sea: Reflections (2013) were inspired by more than two years of research into Lake Champlain's history, interviews with divers, and Lusk's experiences on the lake, especially the area called the Inland Sea, which is an old name for the broad lake east of the Champlain Islands of South Hero/Grand Isle, North Hero and Isle LaMotte. Lake Studies and The Inland Sea were publishing collaborations with the Lake Champlain Maritime Museum.

The poems in Lusk's collection Kin (Wind Ridge, 2013) were largely inspired by the wildlife he encountered while living in rural northern Vermont. The collection was a finalist for the Tupelo Press Dorset and Snowbound Awards, the Sarabande Press Morton Prize, and White Pine Press Book Award. Many of the individual poems in this collection were first published in national journals, among them Appalachia, The Iowa Review, New Letters, Nimrod International Journal, North American Review, and The Southern Review. The British writer J. B. Pick (John Pick) wrote of Kin, “…the ability to focus imagery, unite disparates, use language with grace and power…the astonishments which occur every page show clearly that Lusk is a poet of rare talent.”

Lusk's next collection, The Vermeer Suite (Wind Ridge, 2015), includes poems inspired by the paintings of the seventeenth-century Dutch painter Johannes Vermeer. The book includes full-color images of some of Vermeer's works.

Lusk's 2017 collection, The Shower Scene from Hamlet (Mapletree Editions), invites readers, "to reexamine characters from literature or history and to contemplate their unknowns, to consider the moments that might not have made it into Hamlet or other volumes."

Every Slow Thing (Kelsay Books, 2022) is a collection of poems of place and time "that stun you with the originality of their imagery” according to Chrys Salt, from MBE

"Farthings" (Yavanika Press, 2022) is a collection of twenty-six micro-poems. Poet John Surowiecki wrote that in this book "you'll find witticisms, puns, mini-satires, jokes, delightful re-definitions. But behind all of it is Daniel's unmitigated love of the natural world.”

Lusk also was editor of Onion River: Six Vermont Poets (1996) and the author of a poetry primer Homemade Poems (1974). Other works include a memoir, Girls I Never Married, (2014) and a novel, O, Rosie (1979).

In 2006 Lusk won the Nimrod International Journal of Prose and Poetry's Pablo Neruda Prize for Poetry. Lusk was a semi-finalist for the same prize in 2017 for his poem "Robyn of the Snows."

In 2015 Lusk was awarded a Pushcart Prize for his essay "Bomb," which appeared in the Spring/Summer 2014 issue of the literary journal New Letters and was republished in Pushcart Prize XL, edited by Bill Henderson (2016). The Pushcart Prize is an international award given to authors whose work has been published by small literary magazines or small book presses. Lusk has also received a Gertrude Claytor Memorial Award from the Poetry Society of America. He has also been awarded grants and literary fellowships from the Vermont Arts Council, Vermont Arts Endowment, the University of Vermont, and Pennsylvania Council on the Arts.
