= Heiko Melzer =

German politician (born 1976)

- Melzer in 2026

Member of the Abgeordnetenhaus of Berlin
- Incumbent
- Assumed office 26 October 2006
- Constituency: Spandau (2006–2011); Spandau 4 (2011–present)

Personal details
- Born: 25 February 1976 (age 50) Berlin
- Party: Christian Democratic Union (since 1996)

Heiko Melzer (born 25 February 1976 in Berlin) is a German politician serving as a member of the Abgeordnetenhaus of Berlin since 2006. He has served as chairman of the Christian Democratic Union in Spandau since 2023.
