= Johanna Melzer =

German politician

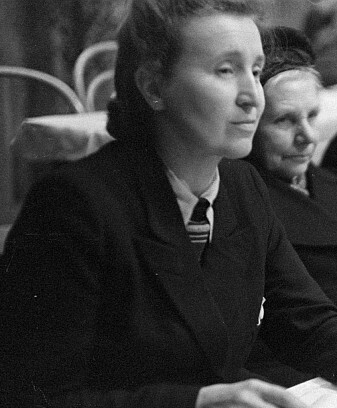
- Born: April 7, 1904
- Died: October 3, 1960 (aged 56); East Berlin, East Germany
- Occupations: German resistance activist, politician
- Political party: Communist Party of Germany

Johanna Melzer (7 April 1904 - 3 October 1960) was a German political activist and Communist Party member who participated in the German resistance to Nazism. She spent eleven of the twelve years of the Third Reich in prison, earning the soubriquet "Iron Johanna" ("Eiserne Johanna") for her ability to remain silent under torture. After the end of World War II, she became a regional politician in West Germany.

== Early life ==
Johanna Melzer was born on April 7, 1904 in Oberwaldenburg, a mining village in Lower Silesia close to the German frontier with Bohemia, southwest of Breslau. Her father was a miner. When she was a child, her family relocated to the Ruhr region in connection with her father's work: she attended junior school in Rünthe, before moving on to a commercially focused secondary school in Hamm.

Melzer trained for work as a sales assistant and for clerical employment. The family were politically conscious, and in 1923 she joined both the Communist Party of Germany and its youth wing, the Young Communist League of Germany. From 1925 till 1930 she was employed as a book keeper with the "Ruhr-Echo", a daily newspaper. Between 1925 and 1932 she lived with Walter Duddins, a Communist activist to whom, she later wrote, she owed a large part of her own political awakening. Locally she became a leader of the Red Front Women's Alliance ("Rote Frauen und Mädchenbund") in Bochum. In 1928-29 she was listed as the Communist Party's Agitation and Propaganda chief for the Bochum sub-district.

In 1930, Melzer moved to Thuringia, where she became a member of the party regional leadership team ("Bezirksleitung") in Erfurt. Here she also worked as the book keeper and treasurer of the local Red Aid ("Rote Hilfe") communist workers' welfare organisation. She remained in Erfurt till 1932, also serving as a party instructor and, towards the end of her time, leader in the women's department of the regional party leadership.

== World War II ==
=== Early resistance: 1933-1934 ===
By March 1933, Melzer had returned to the Dortmund area. In January 1933, the Nazi Party took power and converted Weimar Germany into a one-party dictatorship. Political activity - except in support of the Nazi Party - became illegal. At the end of February the Reichstag fire was blamed on the Communists, and in March 1933 Communists began to be arrested. From March 1933, Melzer was working illegally as a "party instructor" in the Dortmund area and in July 1933 she was arrested. She was placed in the Moringen concentration camp where she remained till December 1933.

Soon after the Nazi Party and Adolf Hitler came to power, Melzer arranged for the "Oblies" dress shop in Dortmund, where she was a customer, to become a focal point for resistance activists. Various Communist Party newspapers were distributed from there, such as The Red Flag ("Die Rote Fahne") and The International, as well as a publication that hid its identity behind the camouflaging name "Rolleiflex". Because of intelligence received from the Gestapo in Berlin, local police were aware of this arrangement by the end of 1933, and of the significance of the phrase "I've come from the Lyon boutique" ("Ich komme vom Modehaus Lyon") which resistance fighters used to identify themselves. Along with her activities in Dortmund, Johanna Metzler worked illegally as a "party instructor" in Bielefeld, Osnabrück and Hagen, in and beyond the eastern part of the Ruhr industrial conurbation.

=== Political prisoner: 1934-1945 ===
Melzer was arrested for a second time on 26 August 1934 and held under investigatory detention, initially at the infamous "Steinwache" interrogation prison beside the Main Railway Station in Dortmund. She was held here for some time during which she underwent a sustained period of interrogation and sustained serious mistreatment, according to one source "isolated for weeks on end" and "bound hand and foot". It was during this time that she earned from fellow detainees the soubriquet "Iron Johanna" ("Eiserne Johanna") because she stayed silent under torture. A couple of weeks after her arrest, on 7 September 1934, she wrote a letter to her parents and family. The letter was intercepted by the prison censors, but today it is retained in the archives of the high court at Hamm, where it provides a lasting testimony to Johanna Metzler's mental strength and courage. She was subsequently transferred to Hamm where she appeared before the High Court on 1 March 1935, She was charged with "the crime of preparing a highly treasonable undertaking" ("Verbrechens der Vorbereitung eines hochverräterischen Unternehmens"). The prosecution requested a death sentence, but the court sentenced her to a fifteen-year term of imprisonment plus ten years of deprivation of civil rights.

Melzer spent the next ten years in a succession of prisons. Nazi Germany surrendered early in May 1945 and Melzer was liberated from prison by Allied forces on 4 May 1945. She moved to Thuringia where she became head of the women's section with the Communist party leadership in Erfurt. Thuringia had been successfully invaded during the opening months of 1945 by the American army, but under terms already agreed between the allied leaders the area was to be incorporated into the Soviet occupation zone (after 1949 the German Democratic Republic). On 3 July 1945 the American military withdrew, and for the rest of Mezler's time in Erfurt the city was administered by the Soviets.

== Post-war activism and political career ==
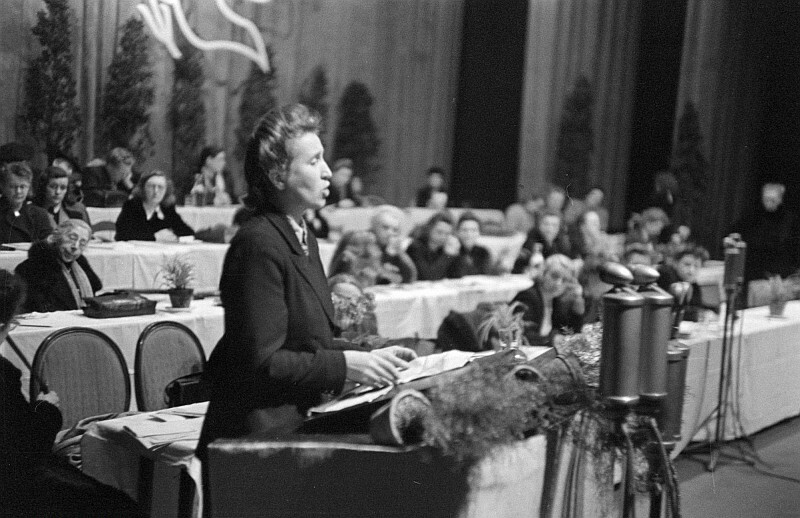
Melzer at the German Women's Congress for Peace in Germany, 1947

Towards the end of 1946, Melzer returned to Dortmund, then administered as part of the British occupation zone (after 1949 part of the German Federal Republic). There, she joined the Communist Party regional leadership team ("Bezirksleitung") for the Ruhr region. She was appointed a member of the Westphalia provincial assembly in 1946, and following a return to democracy, she was elected a member of its successor body, the Landtag (regional legislature) of North Rhine-Westphalia, for a three-year term starting in 1947. During her time in the assembly she was vocal in support of equal pay for women and in opposition to the production of more nuclear weapons.

"If we are doing the same work in the businesses and offices, then it is unfair to wish to compensate us with a fraction of a man's wage. Equal rights for equal work must become a reality at last"
"Wenn wir in den Betrieben und in den Büros die gleiche Arbeit leisten, dann ist es ungerecht, uns mit einem Bruchteil des Männerlohnes entschädigen zu wollen. Gleiches Recht für gleiche Arbeit muß endlich Wirklichkeit werden."

Johanne Mezler, 1946

In 1950, Melzer co-founded a West German outpost of the Democratic Women's League ("Demokratischer Frauenbund Deutschlands" / DFD), becoming its secretary. In 1954, she became a member of the Communist Party Control Commission. It was not till August 1956 that the Communist Party was banned in West Germany (reflecting "the aggressive and combative methods that the party used as a "Marxist-Leninist party struggle" to achieve their goals"). But as the political differences between East and West Germany became ever more stark, especially after the 1953 East German uprising, the Communist Party became increasingly marginalised in West Germany, and in 1953, Johanna Mezler faced an arrest warrant in connection with her political activity. The more direct concern for the authorities in West Germany appears to have involved not her Communist Party membership, but her position within the DFD, which was seen as a proxy for the East German government and its ruling party. She went into hiding and appears to have avoided arrest.

== Later life and death ==
The political separation implicit in the military occupation zones created in 1945 came to be enforced by a physical frontier during the 1950s. In 1956, Melzer relocated to East Berlin, where she lived till her death there on the night of 2/3 October 1960. There are suggestions that her health was damaged and her life thereby shortened by torture she had suffered at the hands of the Gestapo. Her sister Klara's attempts to have the 1953 indictment lifted posthumously were rejected by the West German authorities who inferred that her relocation to East Germany in 1956 was tantamount to a confession of guilt.
