= Graham Lusk =

American nutritionist (1866–1932)

Graham Lusk FRS(For) FRSE
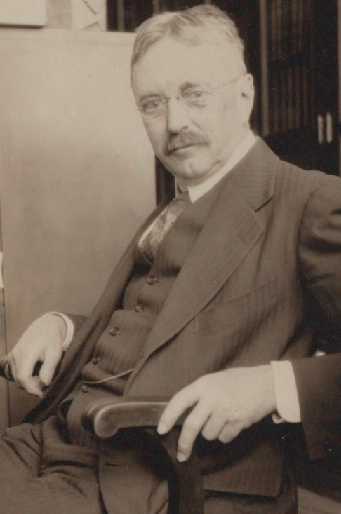
- Born: February 5, 1866; Bridgeport, Connecticut, U.S.
- Died: July 18, 1932 (aged 66); New York City, New York, U.S.
- Education: Columbia University; Ludwig-Maximilians-Universität München (LMU)
- Spouse: Mary Woodbridge Tiffany
- Parent(s): William Thompson Lusk; Mary Hartwell Chittenden
- Relatives: Anna Hartwell Lusk (sister); Simeon B. Chittenden (grandfather)

Graham Lusk FRS(For) FRSE (February 15, 1866 – July 18, 1932) was an American physiologist, and nutritionist. He graduated from Columbia University, and from the Ludwig-Maximilians-Universität München with a PhD. He was an expert on diabetes. He was profoundly deaf from the age of 30.

== Early life ==
He was born in Bridgeport, Connecticut on February 15, 1866, the son of Prof. William Thompson Lusk of Long Island College of Medicine and his wife, Mary Hartwell Chittenden. His maternal grandfather was U.S. Representative Simeon B. Chittenden, and his sister Anna Hartwell Lusk, was a member of Mrs. Astor's "Four Hundred" during the Gilded Age.

He studied at Columbia School of Mines, graduating with an M.A. in 1887. He did further postgraduate studies in Germany under Professor Carl Voit at the Ludwig-Maximilians-Universität München gaining a doctorate (Ph.D.) in 1891.

== Career ==
In 1892, he began assisting in lectures at Yale Medical School and in 1895 became Professor of Physiology there.

In 1898, he moved to Bellevue Hospital, New York City and in 1909 to Cornell University where he remained until death. His papers are held at Cornell University.

In 1899 (largely due to his father's Scottish roots), he was elected a Fellow of the Royal Society of Edinburgh. His proposers were Diarmid Noel Paton, John Clarence Webster, Sir John Batty Tuke and Alexander Bruce. He was elected a member of the United States National Academy of Sciences in 1915 and the American Philosophical Society in 1924.

In 1932, he was also elected a Foreign Fellow of the Royal Society of London.

== Personal life and death ==
In 1899, he married Mary Woodbridge Tiffany, a daughter of Louis Comfort Tiffany. Together, they were the parents of:

- William Thompson Lusk (1901-1978), who married Katharine Adams.
- Louise Tiffany Lusk (1902-1994), who married Collier Platt.
- Louis Tiffany Lusk (1906-1969), who married Eloise Prentice.

Dr. Graham Lusk died in New York on July 18, 1932, aged 66.

== Selected publications ==
- The Elements of the Science of Nutrition (1906, 1917)
- History of Nutrition (unfinished at death)
