= Samuel James Meltzer =

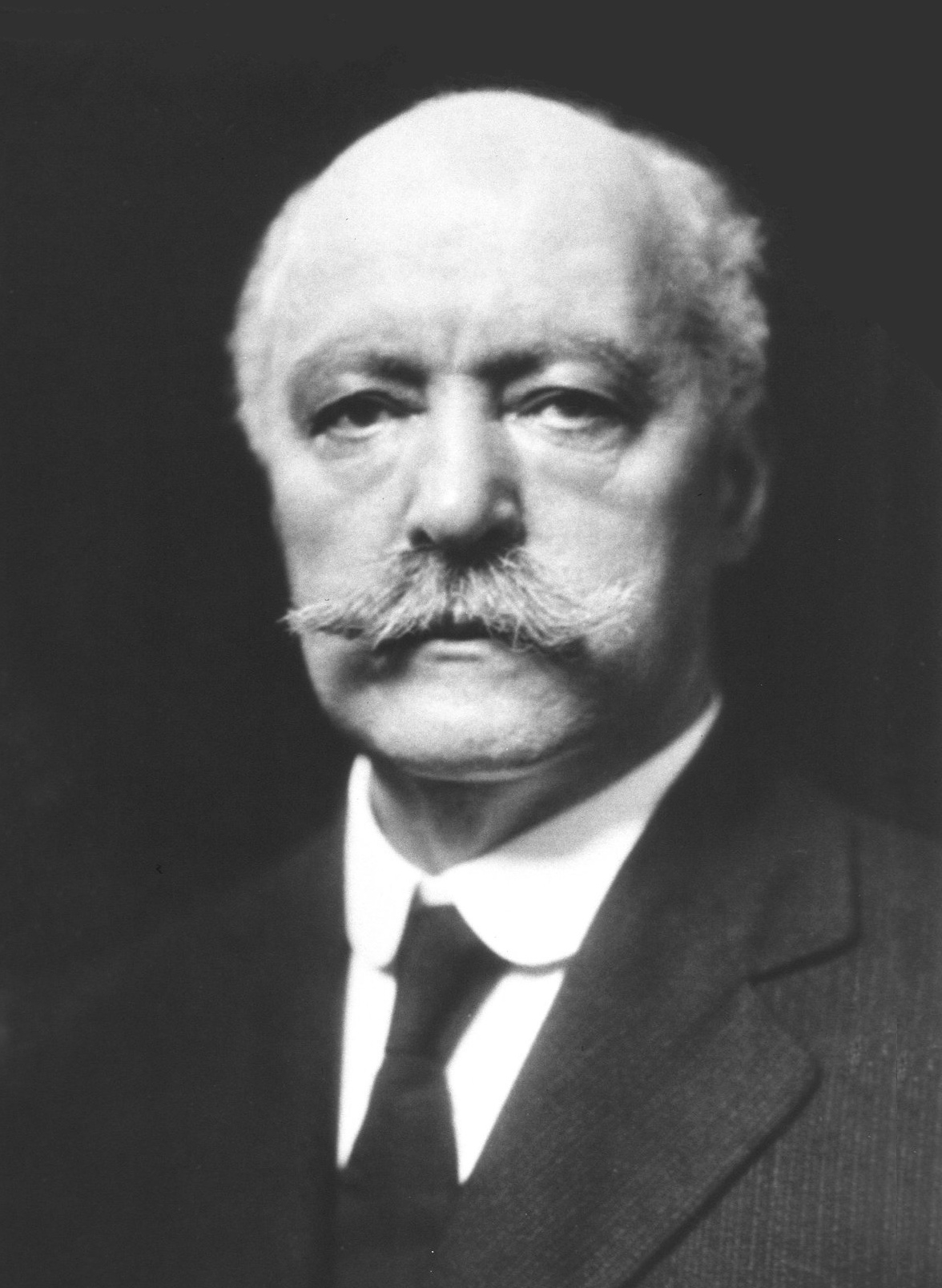
Samuel James Meltzer.

Samuel James Meltzer (March 22, 1851 – November 7, 1920) was an American physiologist.

Samuel Meltzer was educated at the Realgymnasium in Königsberg and then studied philosophy and medicine at the University of Berlin where he gained his MD in 1882. The next year, he and his teacher Hugo Kronecker were among the first to study (in 1883) esophageal manometry in humans.

In the United States, where he practiced his profession in New York City, he went on to serve as consulting physician to Harlem Hospital. In 1906 he was appointed head of the department of physiology and pharmacology at the Rockefeller Institute for Medical Research. He also served as president of the Harvey Society, of the American Society for the Advancement of Clinical Investigation (later renamed to the American Society for Clinical Investigation) in 1909, and of the Association of American Physiologists in 1915. He was an elected member of both the United States National Academy of Sciences and the American Philosophical Society. During World War I, Meltzer was a major in the Medical Reserve Corps, and when the American Association for Thoracic Surgery was organized in 1918 he was elected president. Meltzer was occupied in research in various fields almost to the time of his death.
