= Simeon B. Chittenden =

American politician

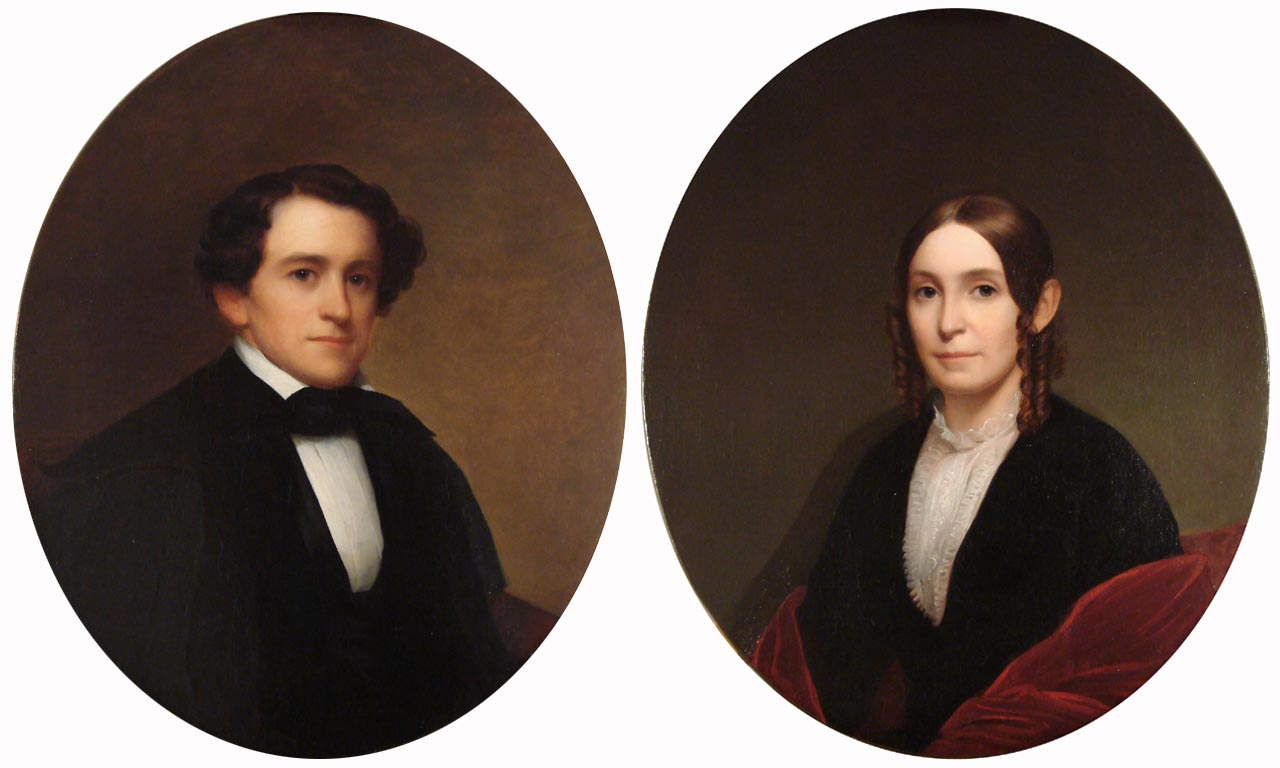
- Oil Portraits of Simeon Baldwin Chittenden & Mary Elizabeth Hartwell

Member of the U.S. House of Representatives from New York's 3rd district
- In office November 3, 1874 – March 3, 1881
- Preceded by: Stewart L. Woodford
- Succeeded by: J. Hyatt Smith

Personal details
- Born: Simeon Baldwin Chittenden; March 29, 1814 Guilford, Connecticut
- Died: April 14, 1889 (aged 75) Brooklyn, New York
- Party: Republican; Independent Republican
- Spouse: Mary Elizabeth Hartwell
- Parent(s): Abel Chittenden; Anna Hart Baldwin Chittenden

Simeon Baldwin Chittenden (March 29, 1814 – April 14, 1889) was a United States representative from New York.

== Early life ==
Chittenden was born in Guilford, New Haven County, Connecticut on March 29, 1814. He was the son of Abel Chittenden (1779–1816) and Anna Hart (née Baldwin) Chittenden (1784–1845). His siblings included Henry Baldwin Chittenden and Sarah Dudley Chittenden, both of whom died young.

He attended Guilford Academy. In 1871, Chittenden received an honorary M.A. degree from Yale University.

== Career ==
From 1829 to 1842, he engaged in mercantile pursuits in New Haven as a clerk with McCracken & Merriman. In 1842, he moved to New York City and further in pursuit of mercantile business. From 1867 to 1869, he was vice president of the New York City Chamber of Commerce.

Chittenden was an unsuccessful candidate for election in 1866 to the 40th United States Congress. He was, however, successful in 1872 where he was elected as an Independent Republican to the Forty-third Congress to fill the vacancy caused by the resignation of Stewart L. Woodford; he was reelected as an Independent Republican to the Forty-fourth Congress and as a Republican to the Forty-fifth and Forty-sixth Congresses and served from November 3, 1874 to March 3, 1881. He was an unsuccessful candidate for re-election in 1880 to the Forty-seventh Congress and retired from public life.

== Personal life ==
On May 10, 1837, Chittenden was married to Mary Elizabeth Hartwell (1815–1852), the daughter of Sherman Hartwell and Sophia Todd. His father-in-law was the nephew of American founding father Roger Sherman and his first wife, Elizabeth Hartwell. Together, they were the parents of:

- Mary Hartwell Chittenden (1840–1871), who married Dr. William Thompson Lusk (1838–1897), an Adjutant-General in the United States Volunteers during the Civil War.
- Simeon Baldwin Chittenden (1845–1922), a Yale graduate who married Mary Warner Hill (1847–1925).
- Charlie Sherman Chittenden (1850–1852), who died young.

After his first wife's death, he remarried Cornelia (née Colton) Colton (d. 1884), the daughter of Oren Colton and widow of Rev. Walter Colton (a Chaplain for the United States Navy), in 1854.

He died in Brooklyn on April 14, 1889. He was buried at Green-Wood Cemetery in Brooklyn, New York. After his death, he was eulogized by Seth Low. In his will, after bequests to charity, he directed the establishment of two trusts, one for his son and one for his late daughter.

U.S. House of Representatives
Preceded by Stewart L. Woodford	Member of the U.S. House of Representatives from New York's 3rd congressional district 1874–1881	Succeeded by J. Hyatt Smith
