= Kansas's 21st Senate district =

American legislative district

Kansas's 21st State Senate district
Senator
Dinah Sykes; D–Lenexa
- Demographics: 77% White; 6% Black; 10% Hispanic; 4% Asian; 2% Other
- Population (2018): 76,544

Kansas's 21st Senate district is one of 40 districts in the Kansas Senate. It has been represented by Democrat Dinah Sykes since 2017; Sykes was first elected as a Republican but switched parties in 2018.

== Geography ==
District 21 is based in Lenexa in the Johnson County suburbs of Kansas City, covering the vast majority of that city as well as smaller parts of Overland Park and Shawnee.

The district is located entirely within Kansas's 3rd congressional district, and overlaps with the 14th, 16th, 17th, 22nd, 23rd, 24th, 30th, and 121st districts of the Kansas House of Representatives.

== Recent election results ==
=== 2020 ===
2020 Kansas Senate election, District 21
Party	Candidate	Votes	%
Democratic	Dinah Sykes (incumbent)	24,203	54.8
Republican	Tom Bickimer	19,970	45.2
Total votes		44,173	100
Democratic gain from Republican			

=== 2016 ===
2016 Kansas Senate election, District 21
Primary election
Party	Candidate	Votes	%
Republican	Dinah Sykes	4,442	57.9
Republican	Greg Smith (incumbent)	3,226	42.1
Total votes		7,668	100
Democratic	Logan Heley	2,956	81.7
Democratic	Michael Czerniewski	663	18.3
Total votes		3,619	100
General election
Republican	Dinah Sykes	18,149	50.3
Democratic	Logan Heley	15,287	42.4
Libertarian	Michael Kerner	2,617	7.3
Total votes		36,053	100
Republican hold			

=== 2012 ===
2012 Kansas Senate election, District 21
Primary election
Party	Candidate	Votes	%
Republican	Greg Smith	3,581	52.1
Republican	Joe Beveridge	3,290	47.9
Total votes		6,871	100
General election
Republican	Greg Smith	17,527	53.2
Democratic	Juanita Roy	15,441	46.8
Total votes		32,968	100
Republican hold			

=== Federal and statewide results ===
Year	Office	Results
2020	President	Biden 56.3 – 41.2%
2018	Governor	Kelly 57.6 – 34.7%
2016	President	Clinton 47.9 – 44.5%
2012	President	Romney 53.0 – 44.8%
