= David Huff =

David Huff or Dave Huff may refer to:

- David Huff (baseball) (born 1984), American pitcher
- David C. Huff (1936-2019), American politician and member of the Kansas House of Representatives
- David Huff (drummer) (born 1961), American drummer of White Heart and Giant
- David Huff, guitarist of David and the Giants, active 1960s
- David Huff, professor of geography and marketing, creator of the Huff model for retail trade analysis.

== See also ==
- David Hough (disambiguation)
