= John Vermillion =

American politician

Member of the Kansas Senate from the 15th district
- In office 1973–1980
- Preceded by: Richard Dean Rogers
- Succeeded by: Dan Thiessen

Member of the Kansas Senate from the 10th district
- In office 1969–1972
- Succeeded by: Donald Zimmerman

Member of the Kansas House of Representatives from the 27th district
- In office 1957–1960

Personal details
- Born: April 1, 1922 Osawatomie, Kansas
- Died: September 20, 2021 (aged 99) Independence, Kansas
- Party: Republican
- Spouse: Bonnie May Price (m. June 20, 1946)
- Children: 4

John Frederick Vermillion (April 1, 1922–September 20, 2021) was an American politician and newspaper publisher who served in the Kansas House of Representatives and Kansas State Senate.

Vermillion was born in Osawatomie, Kansas and moved with his family to Independence, Kansas in 1926. He earned an associate's degree and then served in the U.S. Navy during World War II. He was discharged and returned to Kansas in 1945, marrying Bonnie May Price in 1946 and becoming a father of four. Vermillion owned and published a newspaper, the Independence Weekly News.

In 1956, he ran for the Kansas House of Representatives and won, serving two terms from 1957 to 1960. He left the state legislature, but returned in the 1968 election, when he ran for the Kansas Senate, serving one term in the 10th Senate district and two additional terms in the 15th after redistricting. He continued publishing his paper until July 2021.
