= Kay O'Connor =

American politician

Member of the Kansas State Senate from the 9th District
- In office 2001–2006
- Preceded by: Richard M. Becker
- Succeeded by: Julia Lynn

Member of the Kansas House of Representatives from the 14th District
- In office 1993–2000
- Preceded by: Mark Parkinson
- Succeeded by: Dan Williams

Personal details
- Born: November 28, 1941 Everett, Washington
- Died: October 10, 2018
- Party: Republican
- Spouse: Art O'Connor
- Children: 6

Kay O'Connor (November 28, 1941 – October 10, 2018) was a member of the Kansas Senate and the Kansas House of Representatives.

Born in Everett, Washington, O'Connor moved to Kansas as a child and married her husband, Art, at 17. She was elected to the Kansas House in 1993. After spending 4 terms there, she ran for higher office in 2000, winning election to the State Senate.

O'Connor was a leader in the conservative turn in the Kansas Republican party. Early in her state senate tenure, she drew national attention for views which opponents characterized as opposing women's suffrage. At an event organized by the League of Women Voters, O'Connor said that: "We have a society that does tear families apart...I think the 19th Amendment, while it's not evil in and of itself, is a symptom of something I don't approve of." O'Connor disputed the interpretation of her remarks as opposing women's suffrage. There were attempts to organize a petition for a recall election. O'Connor was reelected in 2004, albeit narrowly; she took 53.5% of the vote in the primary election, beating fellow Republican Rob Boyer, and more easily defeated Democrat Mike Boatright in the general election, with 60% of the vote.

In 2005, she announced that she would run for Kansas Secretary of State, setting off another wave of national attention due to the controversy over her views on suffrage. O'Connor did not win the November 2006 primary, losing to incumbent Secretary of State Ron Thornburgh by a substantial margin (O'Connor took 27% of the vote to Thornburgh's 73%). In October 2006, O'Connor resigned her seat in the State Senate; she was replaced by Julia Lynn.

O'Connor died in 2018 after a lengthy illness.
