= Frank Weimer =

American politician

Member of the Kansas House of Representatives from the 30th district
- In office 1987–1992
- Preceded by: Stephen Cloud
- Succeeded by: Gary Haulmark

Personal details
- Born: February 21, 1923
- Died: February 5, 2012 (aged 79)
- Party: Republican

Franklin E. Weimer (February 21, 1923–February 5, 2012) was an American politician who served as a Republican member of the Kansas House of Representatives from 1987 to 1992. He represented the 30th District and lived in Lenexa, Kansas. He was succeeded by fellow Republican Gary Haulmark.
