= Gus Bogina =

American politician (1927–2023)

Member of the Kansas State Senate from the 10th District
- In office 1981–1995
- Preceded by: Frank Smith
- Succeeded by: Nick Jordan

Member of the Kansas House of Representatives from the 30th District
- In office 1975–1980
- Succeeded by: Stephen Cloud

Personal details
- Born: September 13, 1927 Girard, Kansas, U.S.
- Died: November 15, 2023 (aged 96) Topeka, Kansas, U.S.
- Party: Republican
- Spouse(s): Velma M. Rank (m. 1949; div.); Nancy Kaul (m. 1988-2017)
- Children: 4
- Education: Kansas State University

August Bogina Jr. (September 13, 1927 – November 15, 7023) was an American politician who served in the Kansas State Senate and Kansas House of Representatives as a Republican.

== Early life and career ==
August Bogina Jr. was born in Girard, Kansas and graduated from Kansas State University with a degree in engineering; he worked as a consulting engineer during his career. In 1974, Bogina was elected to the Kansas House of Representatives. He was re-elected twice, in 1976 and 1978, before successfully running for the Kansas Senate in 1980.

Bogina was re-elected to the Senate in 1984, 1988 and 1992. He served as chairman of the Ways and Means Committee from 1985 to 1995, when he left the Senate.

== Personal life and death ==
Bogina married Velma Rank in 1949; the couple had four children before later divorcing. In 1988, he remarried to Nancy Kaul, whom he met while she worked as an executive assistant to several state Senators. Nancy died in 2017. He died in Topeka, Kansas on November 15, 2023, at the age of 96.
