= Gary Haulmark =

American politician

Member of the Kansas House of Representatives from the 30th district
- In office 1993–1995
- Preceded by: Frank Weimer
- Succeeded by: Richard M. Becker

Personal details
- Born: December 23, 1966 (age 59)
- Party: Republican

Gary Haulmark (born December 23, 1966) is an American politician who served as a Republican member of the Kansas House of Representatives from 1993 to 1995. He represented the 30th District and lived in Lenexa, Kansas.

Haulmark was elected in 1992 and was re-elected in 1994. He resigned his seat in spring of 1995 and Richard M. Becker was appointed to replace him.
