= Dennis Miller (disambiguation) =

Dennis Miller (born 1953) is an American comedian, television and radio personality.

Dennis Miller may also refer to:

- Dennis Miller Live, (1994–2002) weekly talk show on HBO, hosted by the above
- Dennis Miller (Australian actor) (1937–2022), Australian actor
- Denny Miller (1934–2014), American actor
- Dennis Miller (ice hockey) (born 1969), ice hockey player and coach
- Dennis Miller (Paralympian), New Zealand Paralympic athlete
- Dennis Miller (politician), American politician
- Dennis Miller (American football), American football coach

== See also ==
- Denis Miller (1918–2009), New Zealand pilot
- Dennis Millar (disambiguation)
- Dennis Miller Bunker (1861–1890), American painter
