= Charlotte Esau =

American politician

Member of the Kansas House of Representatives from the 14th district
- In office January 14, 2019 – January 9, 2023
- Preceded by: Keith Esau
- Succeeded by: Dennis Miller
- Incumbent
- Assumed office January 13, 2025
- Preceded by: Dennis Miller

Personal details
- Born: July 29, 1961 (age 64) U.S.
- Party: Republican
- Spouse: Keith Esau
- Website: CharlotteEsau.com

Charlotte Esau (born July 29, 1961) is an American politician serving as the Kansas State Representative for the 14th district since 2019. A member of the Republican Party, her district is located in the center of Johnson County and currently covers north central Olathe and most of central Lenexa; after redistricting for population changes from the 2020 Census, it will cover the north central and northwestern part of Olathe. She was elected in 2018 to succeed her husband, Keith Esau, who ran for Secretary of State of Kansas. In 2022, she lost her seat to Democrat Dennis Miller, but won her seat back from him in 2024.
