= Senator Zimmerman =

Senator Zimmerman may refer to:

- Donald Zimmerman (born 1931), Kansas State Senate
- Gail D. Zimmerman (1933–2025), Wyoming State Senate
- Jo Ann Zimmerman (1936–2019), Iowa State Senate
- Peter C. Zimmerman (1887–1950), Oregon State Senate
