= Frank Smith (Kansas politician) =

American politician

Member of the Kansas Senate from the 10th district
- In office 1977–1980
- Preceded by: Donald Zimmerman
- Succeeded by: Gus Bogina

Member of the Kansas House of Representatives from the 27th district
- In office 1975–1976

Personal details
- Born: July 31, 1952 (age 74)
- Party: Democrat

Frank E. Smith (born July 31, 1952) is an American former politician who served in the Kansas State Senate and Kansas House of Representatives as a Democrat during the 1970s. He was in the House for one term, from 1975 to 1976, and then served one term in the state senate, from 1977 to 1980.
