= Nick Jordan (politician) =

American politician (born 1949)

Kansas Secretary of Revenue
- Incumbent
- Assumed office January 2011
- Governor: Sam Brownback
- Preceded by: Joan Wagnon

Member of the Kansas Senate from the 10th district
- In office August 1, 1995 – January 12, 2009
- Preceded by: Gus Bogina
- Succeeded by: Mary Pilcher-Cook

Personal details
- Born: December 2, 1949 (age 76) Kansas City, Missouri, U.S.
- Party: Republican
- Spouse: Linda
- Children: 4

Nick Jordan (born 1949) is an American Republican politician who was formerly a member of the Kansas State Senate for the 10th District, which is centered on Shawnee, Kansas. He was also the unsuccessful Republican candidate for Kansas's 3rd congressional district in 2008, losing to Democratic incumbent Dennis Moore. When Moore decided not to run for another term in 2010, Jordan briefly ran for the seat once again before dropping out. Jordan was nominated by Governor-elect Sam Brownback to serve as his Secretary of Revenue. His nomination was confirmed by the State Senate.

== Early life ==
Jordan was born in 1949 and is a lifelong Kansan. Jordan started his career as a busboy, eventually becoming a hotel manager and founding president of the Overland Park Convention and Visitors Bureau. Jordan has a 40-year career in the travel and tourism industry. Jordan has been married to his wife Linda for over 25 years; together they have a daughter and three grandchildren.

== State senator ==
In 1995, Jordan was selected by Republican precinct committee people and appointed by then-Gov. Bill Graves to fill the seat vacated by a former state senator. Succeeding that, Jordan was reelected without serious opposition. One of the more powerful and influential senators in Kansas, Jordan served as chairman of numerous committees. He was the chairman of the Joint Committee on Economic Development and co-chairman of the Commerce Committee. Jordan retired in 2008 to run for Congress.

== Education voting record ==
Jordan, like most Johnson County representatives, has continually voted against increasing education funding statewide. This insistence eventually led the Kansas City Star to endorse his 2004 opponent saying Jordan "can't be counted on to make tough votes raising money for our schools".

== 2008 congressional race ==
Jordan informally entered the congressional race in August 2007. Upon his entry, the Kansas City Star noted Jordan claimed to have united the divided factions, the social conservatives and the economic conservatives, that have split the Republican Party in the recent past. The Kansas City Star concluded that he would be a formidable challenger to Moore in the 3rd, which has traditionally been the heartland of moderate Kansas Republicans. Steve Rose, publisher of The Johnson County Sun, however, has highlighted Jordan's consistently conservative voting record saying, "He votes with the right-wing crowd on education, embryonic stem cell research, and all the other hot-button right-wing issues. I know Nick Jordan, and he is no moderate." According to Jordan's website, his top campaign issues include making health care more accessible, keeping the economy strong and returning integrity back to Congress.

Jordan lost to Moore but garnered more than 142,000 votes. Mary Pilcher-Cook replaced him in the state senate. He then became a director with Cohen-Esrey Real Estate Services in Mission, Kansas. He announced his intention to run for the seat again in 2010 but left the race a few months later before the primary election had occurred. Jordan, as Secretary of Revenue, leads the $40 million effort to upgrade the DMS software in Kansas. This system was implemented in May 2012 and it caused major problems for the county offices responsible for processing vehicle titles and registrations.
