= Dennis Moore (politician) =

American politician and lawyer (1945–2021)

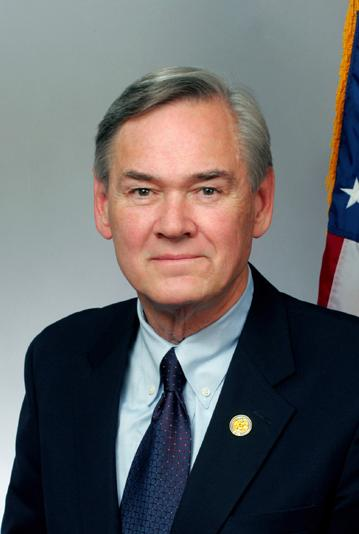

Member of the U.S. House of Representatives from Kansas's 3rd district
- In office January 3, 1999 – January 3, 2011
- Preceded by: Vince Snowbarger
- Succeeded by: Kevin Yoder

Personal details
- Born: November 8, 1945 Anthony, Kansas, U.S.
- Died: November 2, 2021 (aged 75) Overland Park, Kansas, U.S.
- Party: Democratic
- Spouse: Stephene Moore
- Education: University of Kansas (BA); Southern Methodist University; Washburn University (JD)

Military service
- Branch/service: United States Army
- Years of service: 1970–1973

Dennis Moore (November 8, 1945 – November 2, 2021) was an American politician and lawyer, a "Blue Dog" centrist who served for six terms as a U.S. representative for Kansas's 3rd congressional district, from 1999 until 2011. He was a member of the Kansas Democratic Party.

He and Sharice Davids have been the only two Kansas Democrats to serve in Congress since January 2009.

== Early life and education ==
Moore was born in 1945 in Anthony in southcentral Harper County, Kansas. He attended the University of Kansas, from which he earned a bachelor's degree, and was briefly enrolled at Southern Methodist University. He received a Juris Doctor degree from Washburn University School of Law in Topeka, Kansas.

== Career ==
Moore served in the United States Army before becoming Assistant Kansas Attorney General. After a period in private practice, he was elected District Attorney in northeast Johnson County, serving in that capacity from 1977 to 1989. While a defense attorney at the practice of Moriarty, Erker & Moore, he represented Debora Green when she was charged with murder in 1995. The case ended in 1996 with Green pleading no contest to the charges.

Moore was first elected to the United States House in 1998, defeating the Republican incumbent, Vince Snowbarger. The district had traditionally elected moderate Republicans, but Snowbarger's unyielding conservatism caused many voters to shift to Moore. He thus became the first Democrat to represent the district in 37 years, after Democrat Newell A. George lost re-election to Republican Robert Fred Ellsworth, when it was the 2nd District. (It was renumbered the 3rd District by 1963.)

Moore faced Republican conservative Phill Kline in 2000. He narrowly held his seat, taking 50% of the vote. His margin of victory was fairly close believed to be due to George W. Bush's strong performance in the district. In 2002, he won another close race, this time against moderate Republican Adam Taff, an airline pilot. In 2004, Moore defeated law professor Kris Kobach, another conservative, in the general election, with 55% of the vote.

In the 2006 Congressional election, Moore successfully defended his seat against Republican Chuck Ahner, winning with 64% of the vote, a much larger margin than he had in the past.

In August 2007, Republican State Senator Nick Jordan of Shawnee announced he would challenge Moore for the 3rd District seat in 2008. Moore defeated Jordan by a vote of 56% to 40%.

On November 23, 2009, it was reported that after six terms, Dennis Moore would not seek re-election in 2010, when he would turn 65 years old. Moore's wife, Stephene Moore, became the Democratic nominee. She lost the election to Republican State Representative Kevin Yoder. The district was not represented by a Democrat again until 2019 after it was taken by Native American attorney Sharice Davids.

== U.S. House of Representatives ==
While in office Moore represented Kansas's 3rd congressional district, the state's smallest and most affluent, which includes most of the Kansas side of the Kansas City metropolitan area, including Kansas City, Overland Park, Olathe, Shawnee, Lenexa and De Soto. During his early tenure the university town of Lawrence was located in the third district but was later redistricted to the 2nd District.

=== Committee assignments ===
- Committee on the Budget
- Committee on Financial Services
  - Subcommittee on Financial Institutions and Consumer Credit
  - Subcommittee on Oversight and Investigations (Chairman)
- Committee on Small Business
  - Subcommittee on Finance and Tax

Moore was the policy co-chair for the Blue Dog Coalition in the 110th Congress and a member of the New Democrat Coalition.

== Political positions ==
=== Budget, spending, and taxes ===
In 2005–2006, Representative Moore supported the interests of Citizens for Tax Justice, an organization supporting fair taxes for middle and low-income families and the closing of corporate tax loopholes, 83% of the time.

In 2007, the National Taxpayers Union, an organization favoring a flat tax or a national sales tax, gave Representative Moore its rating of F for his 4% rating. The NTU explains "A score significantly below average qualifies for a grade of 'F.' This failing grade places the Member into the 'Big Spender' category." Representative Moore did not support the agenda of the National Tax Limitation Committee and was given a rating of 0 percent in 2007–2008.

=== National security ===
In 2007–2008 the Center for Security Policy, a Washington, D.C. think tank that focuses on national security issues, gave Representative Moore a rating of 25%. Their Congressional Scorecard cites Representative Moore for voting against the CSP position on 18 of 24 key votes. Specifically, Rep. Moore voted to limit Iraq war funding, limit surveillance to FISA guidelines, and vote against Missile Defense funding.

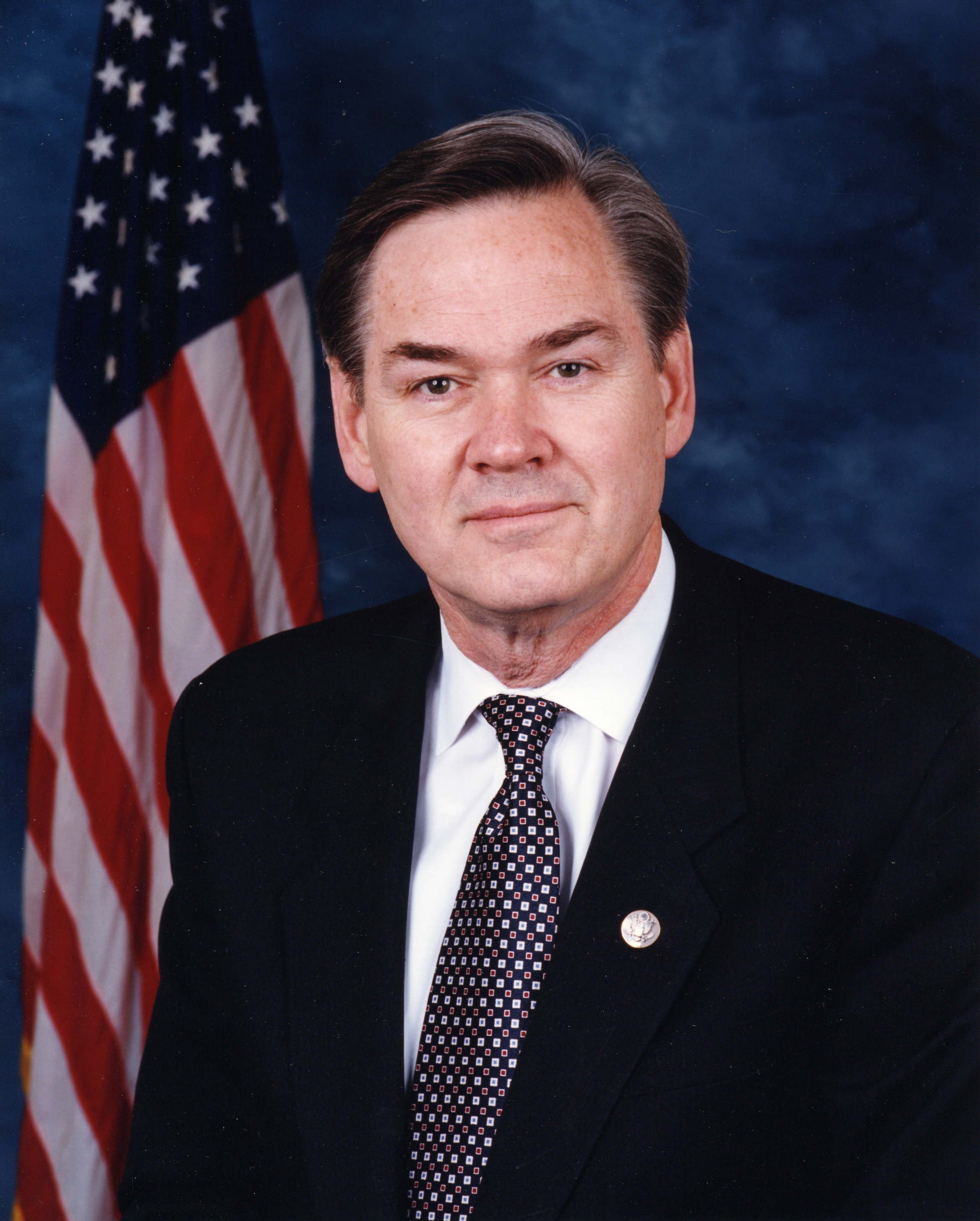
Earlier official photo of Moore.

=== Military ===
Representative Moore sponsored HR 5055, which would have raised the death gratuity paid to the family of a soldier who died in combat from $12,000 to $50,000. This amount was raised again to $100,000 and was added to "The Emergency Supplemental Appropriations Act for Defense, the Global War on Terror and Tsunami Relief Act 2005" and signed into law as Public Law 109-13 on May 11, 2005.

Representative Moore sponsored House Resolution 387 in 2003, calling on the Department of Defense to cover all travel costs for troops from Iraq and Afghanistan granted leave under the Rest & Recuperation Program. The legislation was added to the Department of Defense Supplemental Spending Bill of 2004 and is now law.

=== Property rights ===
For 2007, with points assigned for actions in support of or in opposition to American Land Rights Association position, Representative Moore received a rating of 8 (out of 100). He received an 8% rating for voting on 11 of 12 key votes in opposition to the "Private Property Position".

=== Gun control ===
Through 2003, Representative Moore supported the interests of the Brady Campaign to Prevent Gun Violence 88% of the time.

In 2008, the NRA Political Victory Fund gave Representative Moore a grade of F, in its scorecard for candidates seeking office in 2008. In 2007 the organization Gun Owners of America gave Representative Moore a rating of F.

=== Women's issues ===
Representative Moore was pro-choice and had a 100% rating with NARAL.

In 2007, Representative Moore voted with the League of Women Voters 100% of the time. The League of Women Voters presented Moore with the Making Democracy Work Award in 2010.

For 2007–2008, with points assigned for actions in support of or in opposition to National Right to Life Committee position, Representative Moore received a rating of 0. Representative Moore earned the rating of zero by voting against the Right-To-Life positions during his entire political career.

=== Environment and animal protection ===
The environmental watchdog group League of Conservation Voters gave Moore a score of 92% for 2006, citing pro-environment votes on eleven out of twelve issues deemed critical by the organization. The League praised Moore for supporting right-to-know legislation regarding the Toxics Release Inventory program, the Clean Water Act, and energy and weatherization assistance for low-income families, as well as for opposing oil drilling offshore and in the Arctic National Wildlife Refuge, opposing salvage logging, opposing logging roads in Alaska's Tongass National Forest, and for opposing measures designed to expedite the production of new oil refineries.

The Animal Welfare Institute a national animal protection organization founded in 1951 gave Representative Moore consistently high marks for supporting various animal protection issues on its Compassion Index.

Representative Moore received a rating of 91% in the 109th Congress, a 100% rating in the 110th Congress and a 78% in the 111th Congress.

== Electoral history ==
- 1998: defeated incumbent Vince Snowbarger 52%–48%
- 2000: defeated Phill Kline 50%–47%
- 2002: defeated Adam Taff 50%–47%
- 2004: defeated Kris Kobach 55%–43%
- 2006: defeated Chuck Ahner 64%–34%
- 2008: defeated Nick Jordan 56%–40%

== Health and death ==
In June 2011, Moore was diagnosed with Alzheimer's disease at the St. Luke's Neuroscience Institute. His father also had the disease. After announcing the diagnosis the following year, Moore and his wife Stephene continued to be public about it, and Stephene has become a national advocate for families struggling with Alzheimer's disease.

On November 2, 2021, Moore died from cancer, aged 75, at a care facility in Overland Park, Kansas, where he had lived for the previous three years.

Party political offices
Preceded by Lance Burr	Democratic nominee for Attorney General of Kansas; 1986	Succeeded by Bert Cantwell
Preceded by Jim Cooper	Chair of the Blue Dog Coalition for Policy; 2007–2009; Served alongside: Allen Boyd (Administration), Mike Ross (Communications)	Succeeded by Baron Hill
U.S. House of Representatives
Preceded by Vince Snowbarger	Member of the U.S. House of Representatives from Kansas's 3rd congressional district 1999–2011	Succeeded by Kevin Yoder
