= Richard M. Becker =

American politician (1931–2007)

Rich Becker

Member of the Kansas Senate from the 9th district
- In office 1997–2000
- Preceded by: Bud Burke
- Succeeded by: Kay O'Connor

Member of the Kansas House of Representatives from the 30th district
- In office May 2, 1995 – 1996
- Preceded by: Gary Haulmark
- Succeeded by: David C. Huff

Personal details
- Born: April 16, 1931 St. Louis, Missouri, U.S.
- Died: June 24, 2007
- Party: Republican

Richard M. Becker (April 16, 1931 – June 24, 2007) was an American politician who served in the Kansas House of Representatives and Kansas State Senate.

Becker was originally appointed to the Kansas House on May 2, 1995, to fill out the remaining term of Gary Haulmark, who resigned his seat. In 1996, he ran for the 9th Senate district and won, serving one term before being replaced by Kay O'Connor.
