= David Hough =

David Hough may refer to:

- David L. Hough (born 1937), American writer on motorcycle safety, education and training
- David Hough (politician) (1753–1831), U.S. Representative from New Hampshire

== See also ==
- David Huff (disambiguation)
