= John Rubin =

American politician from Kansas (born 1948)

Member of the Kansas House of Representatives from the 18th district
- In office January 10, 2011 – January 9, 2017
- Preceded by: Cindy Neighbor
- Succeeded by: Cindy Neighbor

Personal details
- Born: June 23, 1948 (age 78) Kansas City, Missouri, U.S.
- Party: Republican
- Spouse: Roberta Rubin
- Education: Boston College; Washington University in St. Louis
- Profession: Kansas State Representative; attorney; former federal administrative law judge; former FDIC Regional Counsel; arbitrator.
- Website: http://www.johnrubin.net

John Rubin (born June 23, 1948) is a former Republican member of the Kansas House of Representatives who represented the 18th district (Shawnee in Johnson County).

Rubin received his B.A. in political science magna cum laude from Boston College in 1970, and a J.D. degree from the Washington University School of Law in 1973. After graduation, Rubin served on active duty as a JAG Corps officer with the U.S. Navy during the Vietnam War. He returned to Kansas City to work for the Kansas City District of the U.S. Army Corps of Engineers as an attorney-advisor. Rubin soon was promoted to serve as a Labor Attorney with the Federal Labor Relations Authority in Kansas City, Missouri, then Assistant Regional Counsel at the Kansas City Regional Office of the Fereal Bureau of Prisons, a senior litigator for the Kansas City Region of the FDIC, and ultimately FDIC Regional Counsel in Atlanta, Georgia. In 1994, the United States Secretary of Health and Human Services, Donna Shalala, appointed him as a Federal Administrative Law Judge for the Social Security Administration in Kansas City, Kansas. He retired ten years later from the federal bench, and has been an arbitrator for the Financial Industry Regulatory Authority since. In 2010, Rubin was elected to represent the 18th district seat in the Kansas House of Representatives, where he served until he voliuntarily retired from the seat in January 2017.

== Personal life ==
John Rubin married Roberta Frances (née Torin) of St. Louis, Missouri, on August 19, 1972. They returned to the Atlanta area in 2018, after his retirement from the Kansas Legislature, residing since in Acworth, Paulding County, Georgia. They have two children, Shana McNeil, of Denver, Colorado, and Sandy Rubin, of Marietta, Georgia, and three grandchildren. Rubin is a practicing Roman Catholic.
