= William Shaw (laboratory owner) =

American chemist

- Education: University of Georgia, Medical University of South Carolina
- Spouse: Yes
- Children: Four sons, one stepson, one stepdaughter
- Scientific career
- Fields: Autism, clinical chemistry, toxicology, Alternative medicine
- Thesis: Some effects of maternal folate deficiency on the development of newborn mice (1971)

William Shaw is an American chemist and the founder of Mosaic Diagnostics, formerly Great Plains Laboratory, based in Lenexa, Kansas.

== Education ==
Shaw has a bachelor's degree in biochemistry from the University of Georgia (1967) and a PhD from the Medical University of South Carolina (1971), also in biochemistry.

== Career ==
After obtaining his PhD, Shaw spent six years working at the Centers for Disease Control and Prevention, where he was a supervisory research chemist and the chief of the radioimmunoassay laboratory. He then worked at Mercer University in Atlanta for a year as an assistant professor of pharmacy, before beginning a twelve-year stint at Smith Kline Beecham Clinical Laboratories, also in Atlanta. From 1991 until 1996, he worked at Children's Mercy Hospital in Kansas City, Missouri.

== Autism ==
William Shaw became focused on autism in 1993, and has claimed that acetaminophen may be a major cause of autism. Nevertheless, as of 2017, there still was no good evidence to claim that acetaminophen caused autism. Shaw has also alleged without credible scientific evidence that yeast infections cause autism. He was accused of "exploit[ing] the parents' understandable and desperate search for a cause of their children's autism". Shaw has endorsed dangerous and discredited chelation treatments for autism.

== Mosaic Diagnostics, formerly Great Plains Laboratory ==
William Shaw's laboratory is known for performing nonstandard tests which have been used by alternative medicine practitioners to support discredited diagnoses. Great Plains Laboratory's urine mycotoxin test is not validated nor recommended for diagnosing any condition.

In May 2020, early in the COVID-19 pandemic, Great Plains marketed unproven antibody tests.
