= Tim Emert =

American politician

Member of the Kansas Senate from the 15th district
- In office 1993–2000
- Preceded by: Dan Thiessen
- Succeeded by: Derek Schmidt

Personal details
- Born: January 29, 1940 Independence, Kansas
- Party: Republican
- Spouse: Barbara Meitner Emert
- Children: 3
- Education: University of Kansas (B.S. and J.D.)

Tim Emert (born January 29, 1940) is an American attorney and former politician from Kansas.

Emert was born in Independence, Kansas and attended the University of Kansas, where he studied journalism and subsequently attended the University of Kansas School of Law. He was a member of his local school board from 1972 to 1987; in that year, he was elected to the Kansas Board of Education, where he served from 1987 to 1992, including two years as its chair.

In 1992, Emert was elected to the Kansas State Senate from the 15th district. He was re-elected in 1996 and served two full terms in the State Senate overall. While in the State Senate, Emert was the chair of the Judiciary Committee, and served as Senate Majority Leader from 1997 to 2000.

In 2010, Governor Mark Parkinson appointed Emert to the Kansas Board of Regents; he served as chair there for one year. He served as vice-mayor of Independence, Kansas during the 2010s.
