= Lance Kinzer =

American politician

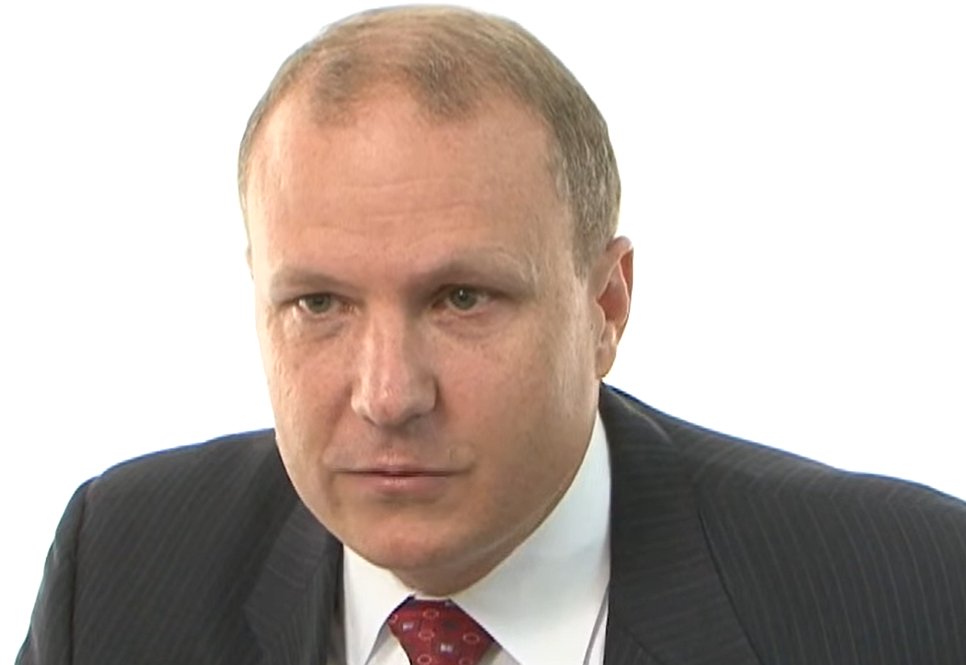
- Kinzer in 2012

Member of the Kansas House of Representatives from the 30th district
- In office January 14, 2013 – 2014
- Preceded by: Ron Worley
- Succeeded by: Randy Powell

Member of the Kansas House of Representatives from the 14th district
- In office July 27, 2004 – 2012
- Preceded by: Dan Williams
- Succeeded by: Keith Esau

Personal details
- Born: April 18, 1970 (age 56) Bay City, Michigan, U.S.
- Party: Republican
- Spouse: Michelle Kinzer
- Education: University of Kansas School of Law

Lance Kinzer (born April 18, 1970) is an American politician served as the Kansas State Representative for the 30th district from 2013 to 2015. A member of the Republican Party, he previously represented the 14th district from 2004 until redistricting.

== Biography ==
Kinzer, who attended Wheaton College and the University of Kansas School of Law, was a partner in the law firm Schlagel & Kinzer, LLC. Prior to his election to the Kansas House of Representatives, he chaired the Olathe Republican Party (2001–2004) and was regional director of Sam Brownback's 2004 U.S. Senate campaign.

Kinzer was appointed to his first term following Dan Williams's resignation in District 14 and has served since July 27, 2004. On June 8, 2012, the Federal District Court released new legislative boundaries for Kansas based on the 2010 U.S. Census; this decision placed State Representative Kinzer in District 30, in the same district with State Representative Ron Worley. Kinzer defeated Worley in the Republican primary for District 30 on August 7, 2012, by a 57%–43% margin. Kinzer subsequently won the general election and began serving his fifth term in the state legislature on January 14, 2013. He was succeeded in District 14 by Keith Esau.

Kinzer ran for Speaker for the 2013–2014 session but did not succeed. The Republican House Caucus chose Ray Merrick. Kinzer registered as a lobbyist for 1st Amendment Partnership in 2016. He had evaluations in excess of 90% from the American Conservative Union and Kansas Chapter of Americans for Prosperity.

He is married to his wife Michelle and they have two children: Pearce Kinzer and Hailey Kinzer.

== Sponsored legislation ==
According to Project Vote Smart, Kinzer has sponsored three pieces of legislation during his six years in the Kansas House of Representatives. He has also cosponsored one bill.

* Prohibiting Health Insurance Mandates – HCR 5032 – 2010

Highlights:
- States that no person or employer shall be required to pay fines for paying directly for lawful health care services (Art. 16).

- States that health care providers shall not be required to pay penalties or fines for accepting direct payment for lawful health care services (Art. 16).

* Partial Birth/Late-term Abortion Reporting Requirements – HB 2206 – 2009

Highlights:
- Requires a physician who performs a partial birth/late-term abortion to create a report that includes the following (Sec. 1):

- Sworn statement by the physician and the referring physician attesting that they are not legally or financially affiliated;
- Medical diagnosis and condition that necessitates the performance of an abortion to save the life of the pregnant woman or the medical diagnosis and condition constituting a substantial and irreversible impairment of a major bodily function.

- Specifies that the annual report on abortions performed in Kansas shall contain the aforementioned information reported by physicians to the extent that such information is not deemed confidential (Sec. 1).

- Amends the legal definition of "viable" to mean the fetus has reached a stage of development at which the physician judges, according to accepted standards, that there is "a reasonable probability that the life of the child can be continued indefinitely" outside the womb with natural or artificial life-supportive measures, whereas the definition in existing law defines it as being a stage of gestation at which the physician judges that it is "capable of sustained life outside the uterus without the application of extraordinary medical means" (Sec. 3).

- Requires, except in the case of a medical emergency, a copy of the abortion-performing physician's written determination specifying if the fetus was determined to be nonviable, if the abortion is necessary to save the life of the pregnant woman, and if continuation of pregnancy will cause substantial and irreversible bodily function impairment to the pregnant woman shall be delivered to the pregnant woman at least 30 minutes prior to an abortion (Sec. 4).

- Authorizes the husband (if he is the father of the child and was married to the woman at the time of the abortion) or the parents or guardians of a woman (if she is under 18 years of age) to obtain "appropriate relief" through civil action if the woman obtained an abortion in violation of reporting and notice requirements, including statutory damages equal to 3 times the cost of the abortion, and "reasonable" attorney fees (Sec. 4).

- Requires pregnant woman seeking an abortion to be told that "the abortion will terminate the life of a whole, separate, unique, living human being" at least 24 hours before the abortion (Sec. 5).

* Legislative Appropriations – HCR 5032 – 2006

Note – The proposed amendment to the Constitution of the State of Kansas was introduced in response to a court ruling that determined that the Kansas State Legislature was in violation of the Constitution of the State of Kansas for its failure to adequately fund the State's public education system. The amendment would remove the court's ability to enforce the Constitution of the State of Kansas in terms of the legislature's burden to fund certain programs.

== Committee membership ==
- Judiciary (Chair)
- Corrections and Juvenile Justice
- Rules and Journal

== Major donors ==
The top 5 donors to Kinzer's 2008 campaign:

- 1. Kansas Medical Society $1,000
- 2. Koch Industries $1,000
- 3. Farmers Insurance Group $1,000
- 4. Wal-Mart $800
- 5. Prairie Band Potawatomi Nation $750
