= Dennis Millar =

Dennis Millar may refer to:

- Dennis Millar of Buster Brown (Australian band)
- Dennis Millar (filmmaker), see Canadian Film Makers (1974 TV series)

== See also ==
- Dennis Miller (disambiguation)
