= Julia Lynn =

American politician

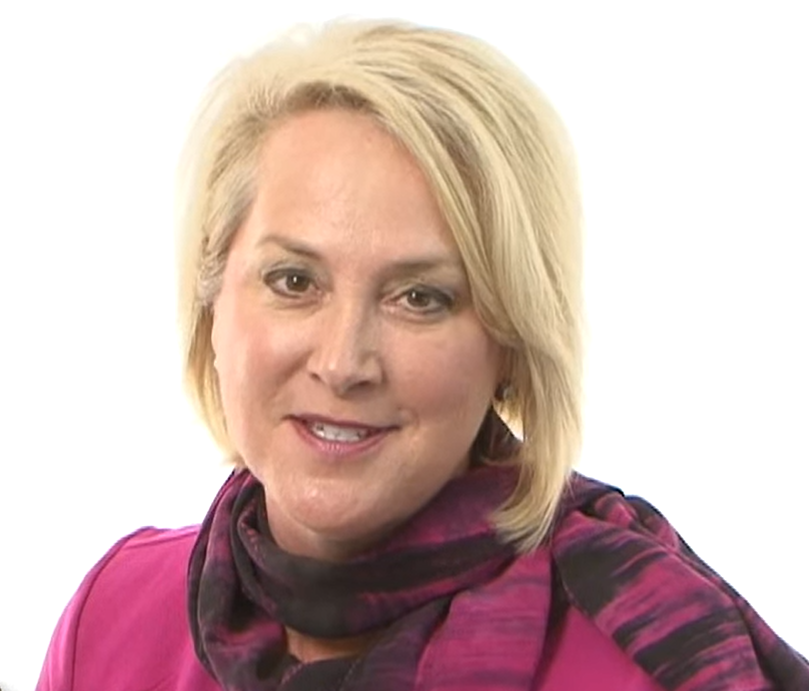
- Lynn in 2012

Member of the Kansas Senate from the 9th district
- In office November 14, 2006 – January 11, 2021
- Preceded by: Kay O'Connor
- Succeeded by: Beverly Gossage

Personal details
- Born: February 22, 1957 (age 69)
- Party: Republican
- Spouse: Jeff Lynn
- Children: 2
- Education: University of Kansas
- Profession: Allied Global Services Account Executive
- Website: www.SenatorJuliaLynn.com

Julia Lynn (born February 22, 1957) is a Republican former member of the Kansas Senate, representing the 9th district (Olathe, De Soto & Gardner) from 2006 to 2021.

Lynn received her B.A. in Political Science from the University of Kansas.

On December 3, 2012, she was elected by her Republican colleagues as Assistant Majority Leader, with 22 of 32 votes. It was the first time Senate Republicans conducted leadership elections in Senate chambers. Elections have previously been conducted in a smaller conference room. The American Conservative Union has given her a lifetime rating of 79%.

After she became chair of the Senate Commerce Committee in 2013, she oversaw the vetting of Antonio Soave, Commerce Secretary to Republican Governors Sam Brownback and then Jeff Colyer. Soave oversaw the outsourcing of considerable work which had previously been done by state employees, to contractors. After Governor Laura Kelly took office, Lynn tried to squelch audits of those contracts. Some work had gone to Allied Global Services (AGS) and Lynn was working for a division of AGS, Inclusion Works. She denied having any conflict of interest in that relationship, a position with which both Republican and Democratic legislators disagreed. Upon audits, considerable problems were found with the contractors.

In the 2020 Kansas Senate elections, she wanted to withdraw her name from the ballot as the Republican nominee for the 9th district citing "personal reasons." However, Kansas Secretary of State Scott Schwab denied her request, saying that the request was signed by a nurse rather than a doctor as required.

== Personal ==
Lynn lives in Olathe and is married to Jeff Lynn. They have two children, a son and a daughter.

== Committee assignments ==
Lynn currently serves on these legislative committees:

- 2015 Special Committee on Taxation
- Assessment and Taxation
- Commerce (Chair)
- Interstate Cooperation
- Judiciary
- Legislative Post Audit Committee
- Telecommunications Study committee
- Utilities
