= Lake Lenexa =

Coordinates: 38.9647°N 94.8402°W

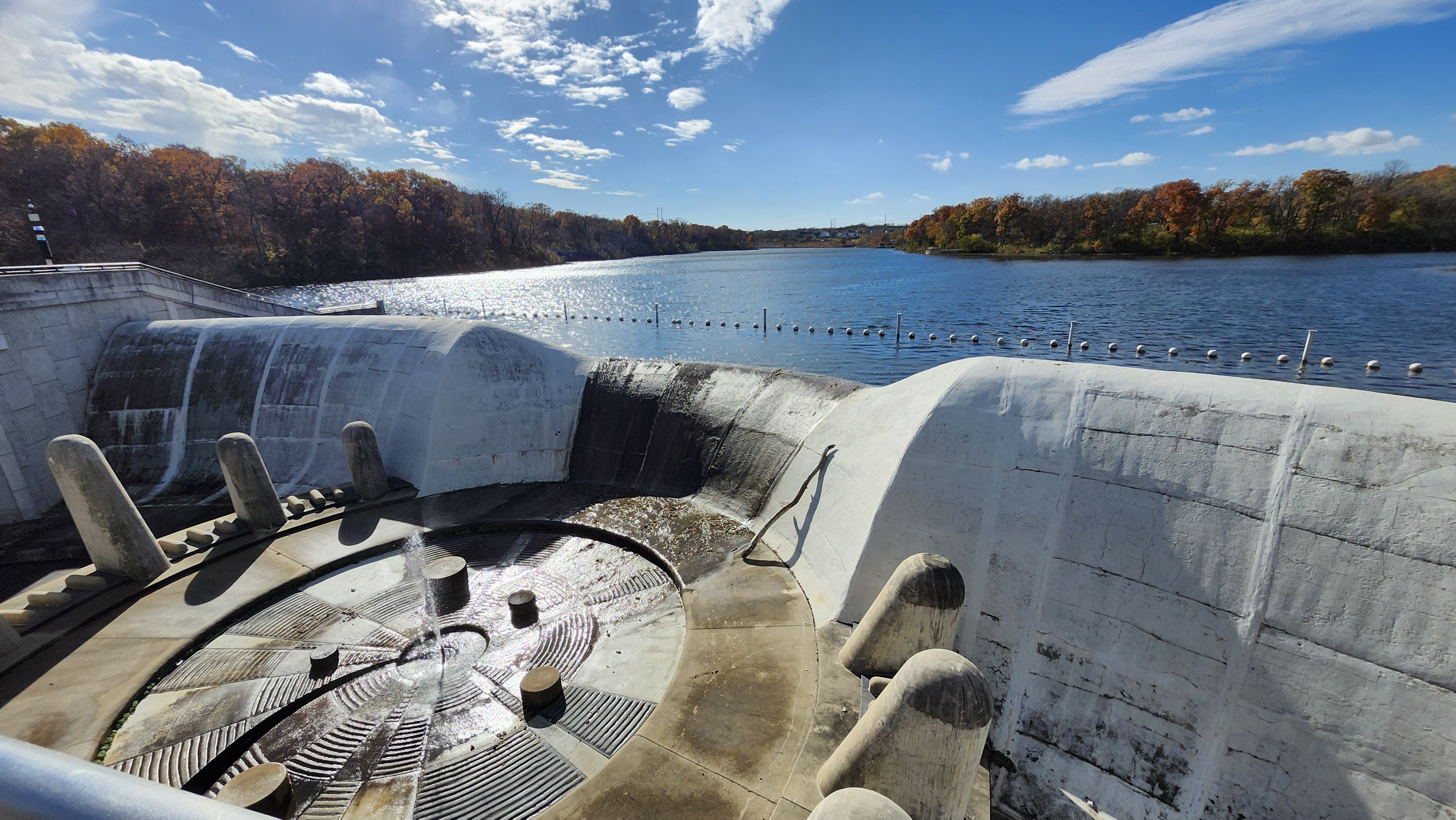
Lake Lenexa viewed from the dam's pedestrian bridge above the spillway

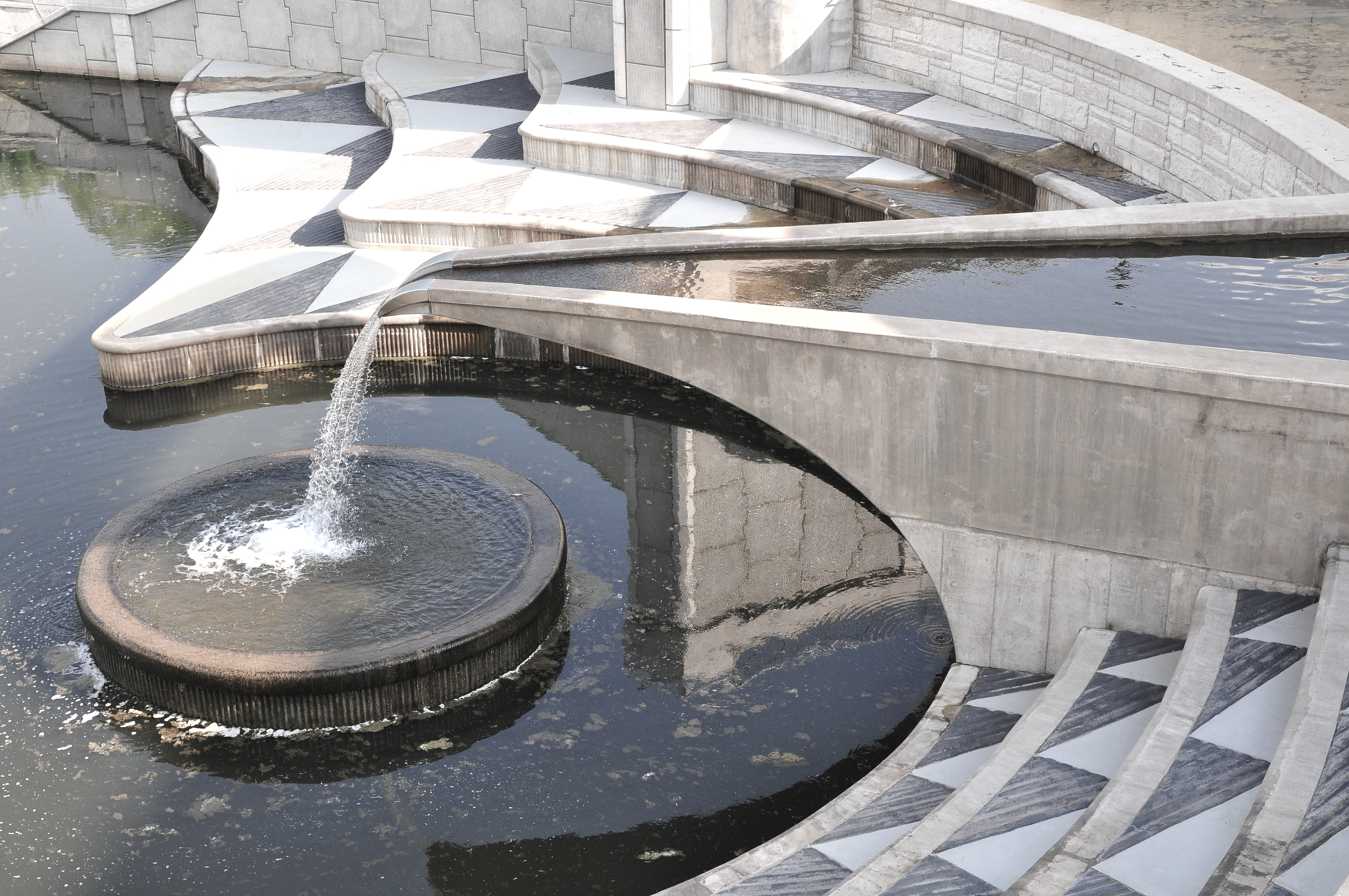
Fountain on Lake Lenexa dam

Lake Lenexa is a flood control reservoir in the Mill Creek drainage tributary to the Kansas River. The 35-acre (14 ha) lake is part of Black Hoof Park in Lenexa, Kansas. The lake is stocked with channel catfish, black crappie, bluegill, sunfish and largemouth bass. There is a boat ramp for launch and recovery of non-gas-powered boats up to 26 ft (7.9 m) long.

== Lake Lenexa Dam ==
Lake Lenexa is impounded by a unique artistically engineered dam and spillway serving as a functional piece of art embellished with fountains and sculptures. The dam was completed in 2006 using 150,000 cu yd (110,000 m^{3}) of earth with 8,000 cu yd (6,100 m^{3}) of concrete for the spillway under a pedestrian bridge. The dam is intended to demonstrate a rain to recreation approach transforming stormwater runoff into a community asset. After the spillway received the 2006 Technical Innovation Award from the American Concrete Institute, Lake Lenexa was recognized by the United States Society on Dams with the 2008 Award of Excellence in the Constructed Project and the 2009 Project of the Year Award.
