= Dan Thiessen (politician) =

American politician

Member of the Kansas Senate from the 15th district
- In office 1981–1992
- Preceded by: John Vermillion
- Succeeded by: Tim Emert

Member of the Kansas House of Representatives from the 8th district
- In office 1969–1980

Personal details
- Born: October 19, 1922
- Died: November 17, 2012
- Party: Republican

Dan Thiessen (October 19, 1922 – November 17, 2012) was an American politician who served in the Kansas House of Representatives and Kansas State Senate.

Thiessen worked as a farmer and rancher in Independence, Kansas. He was elected to the Kansas House in 1968 and served six terms there; in 1980, he was elected to the Kansas Senate and served an additional three terms. In 1982, Thiessen was the Republican nominee for Lieutenant Governor of Kansas, but the ticket was defeated and Thiessen remained in the Senate.

Party political offices
Preceded by Larry "Monty" Montgomery	Republican nominee for Lieutenant Governor of Kansas; 1982	Succeeded by Jack D. Walker
