= Ron Worley =

American politician

Member of the Kansas House of Representatives from the 30th district
- In office January 8, 2007 – January 14, 2013
- Preceded by: David C. Huff
- Succeeded by: Lance Kinzer

Personal details
- Party: Republican
- Spouse: Dana Worley
- Education: Kansas State University

Ron Worley is a former Republican member of the Kansas House of Representatives, representing the 30th district. He served from 2007 through 2013, having been defeated in the 2012 Republican primary by Rep. Lance Kinzer of Olathe, after Kinzer and Worley were put in the same district after re-districting. Kinzer then subsequently retired in 2014, endorsing Randy Powell as his successor. Worley challenged Powell for his old seat in the primary, but was subsequently defeated.

Prior to being elected, Worley worked for 14 years as a building official in Lenexa, and has served in the U.S. Air Force. He received his Bachelor's in Business Administration from Kansas State University.

Worley is a member of the Kansas City Catbackers Club, Leadership Lenexa Alumni Association, Lenexa Chamber of Commerce, and the Veterans of Foreign Wars.

== Committee membership ==
- Commerce and Labor
- Transportation
- Aging and Long Term Care
- Economic Development and Tourism

== Major donors ==
The top five donors to Worley's 2008 campaign:

- 1. Kansans for Lifesaving Cures $1,000
- 2. Kansas Contractors Assoc. $1,000
- 3. Greater Kansas City Chamber of Commerce $900
- 4. AT&T $500
- 5. Kansas Medical Society PAC State Fund $500
