= Donald Zimmerman =

American politician (born 1931)

Member of the Kansas Senate from the 10th district
- In office 1973–1976
- Preceded by: John Vermillion
- Succeeded by: Frank Smith

Member of the Kansas House of Representatives from the 16th district
- In office 1967–1968

Member of the Kansas House of Representatives from the 14th district
- In office 1965–1966

Personal details
- Born: April 6, 1931 (age 95) Olathe, Kansas, U.S.
- Party: Republican

Donald Wayne Zimmerman (born April 6, 1931) is an American former politician who served in the Kansas State Senate and Kansas House of Representatives as a Republican during the 1960s and 1970s. He was originally elected to the Kansas House in 1964, serving two consecutive terms (one in the 14th district and one in the 16th); after an absence from the state legislature, he served one term in the Kansas Senate from 1973 to 1976 before being succeeded by Democrat Frank Smith.
