= Cindy Neighbor =

American politician

Member of the Kansas House of Representatives from the 18th district
- Incumbent
- Assumed office January 9, 2017
- Preceded by: John Rubin
- In office January 8, 2007 – January 10, 2011
- Preceded by: Mary Pilcher-Cook
- Succeeded by: John Rubin
- In office January 13, 2003 – January 10, 2005
- Preceded by: Mary Pilcher-Cook
- Succeeded by: Mary Pilcher-Cook

Personal details
- Born: March 31, 1941 (age 85) Carbondale, Illinois, U.S.
- Party: Democratic
- Spouse: Jim Neighbor

Cindy Neighbor (born March 31, 1941) is a current Democratic member of the Kansas House of Representatives, who represents the 18th district. She first served from 2003 to 2004 as a Republican, and then served as a Democrat from 2007 to 2011. Neighbor ran for re-election in 2010 and was defeated by Republican John Rubin. Neighbor ran again in 2016 and reclaimed her seat, from Erik Jenkins, the Republican who ran to replace the retiring Rubin.

Neighbor, who attended Johnson County Community College and Kansas City Kansas Community College, has worked as a medical administrator as well as a public relations and marketing director.

She has served as Parent Teacher Association president and was on the founding committee of the Ronald McDonald House at the University of Kansas Medical Center. She is also a member of the Board of Indigent Defense Services, Kansas State Board of Education, and the Teacher Credentialing Board.

== Committee membership – 2018 session ==
- Committee on Insurance, Ranking Minority Member
- Committee on Agriculture
- Committee on General Government Budget

== Major donors ==
The top 5 donors to Neighbor's 2008 campaign:

1. Helena Whitlock Revocable Trust $20,000
2. AT&T $1,500
3. Kansans for Lifesaving Cures $1,000
4. Kansas National Education Assoc $1,000
5. Kansas Medical Society $1,000
