= Dan Williams (Kansas politician) =

American politician

Member of the Kansas House of Representatives from the 14th district
- In office 2001–2004
- Preceded by: Kay O'Connor
- Succeeded by: Lance Kinzer

Personal details
- Born: November 9, 1970 (age 55) Jefferson City, Missouri
- Party: Republican

Daniel A. Williams (born November 9, 1970) is an American politician who served as a Republican member of the Kansas House of Representatives from 2001 to 2004.

Williams was elected to represent the 14th district in the 2000 election; the race was an open seat as the incumbent, fellow Republican Kay O'Connor, was (successfully) running for the Kansas State Senate. He was re-elected in 2002, and resigned his seat in 2004; Lance Kinzer was appointed to succeed him, and ran unopposed in both the primary and general elections.
