= Vince Snowbarger =

American politician

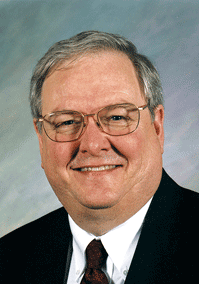

Director of the Pension Benefit Guaranty Corporation
- Acting
- In office 2009–2010
- President: Barack Obama
- Preceded by: Charles E. F. Millard
- Succeeded by: Joshua Gotbaum
- In office 2006–2007
- President: George W. Bush
- Preceded by: Bradley Belt
- Succeeded by: Charles E. F. Millard

Member of the U.S. House of Representatives from Kansas's 3rd district
- In office January 3, 1997 – January 3, 1999
- Preceded by: Jan Meyers
- Succeeded by: Dennis Moore

Member of the Kansas House of Representatives from the 26th district
- In office January 14, 1985 – January 3, 1997
- Preceded by: William Edgar Moore
- Succeeded by: Larry Campbell

Personal details
- Born: Vincent Keith Snowbarger; September 16, 1949 (age 77) Kankakee, Illinois, U.S.
- Party: Republican
- Education: Southern Nazarene University (BA); University of Illinois, Urbana-Champaign (MA); University of Kansas (JD)

Vincent Keith Snowbarger (born September 16, 1949) is an American lawyer and politician from Kansas. He is a former Republican member of the United States House of Representatives.

== Early life ==
Snowbarger was born in Kankakee, Illinois on September 16, 1949. He graduated from Shawnee Mission South High School in Shawnee Mission, Kansas in 1967. He graduated from Southern Nazarene University in 1971 with a Bachelor of Arts, the University of Illinois in 1974 with a Master of Arts, and the University of Kansas School of Law in 1977 with a J.D.

== Career ==
From 1973 to 1977, he was a professor at MidAmerica Nazarene College. From 1977 through 1996, he worked as an attorney in private practice and as an adjunct professor.

From 1985 until 1996 he served in the Kansas House of Representatives representing Olathe. From 1992 to 1996, he was the majority leader of the Kansas House of Representatives. He was elected to Congress in 1996 from Kansas's 3rd congressional district, succeeding 12-year incumbent Jan Meyers.

Although the 3rd has historically been a Republican district, the brand of Republicanism there has traditionally been moderate. However, Snowbarger had an unshakably conservative voting record, especially on social and economic issues. In 1998, his Democratic challenger, former Johnson County District Attorney Dennis Moore, branded Snowbarger as too conservative for the district taking advantage of the ideological split within the GOP. Moore was able to defeat Snowbarger by four points.

During the George W. Bush and Barack Obama administrations, Snowbarger served with the Pension Benefit Guaranty Corporation from 2002 to 2013. He served as acting director of the agency twice while the president nominated a new director. He also served as Deputy Director for Operations (2009-2012) and Senior Advisor for External Affairs (2012-2013).

From 2013 to 2016 he was a real estate associate with Keller Williams Real Estate in Ridgway, Colorado.

He has been retired since 2016.

U.S. House of Representatives
Preceded by Jan Meyers	Member of the U.S. House of Representatives from Kansas's 3rd congressional district 1997–1999	Succeeded by Dennis Moore
U.S. order of precedence (ceremonial)
Preceded by Jim Bunn as Former U.S. Representative	Order of precedence of the United States as Former U.S. Representative	Succeeded by Nancy Boyda as Former U.S. Representative
