= Beverly Gossage =

American politician (born 1950)

Member of the Kansas Senate from the 9th district
- Incumbent
- Assumed office January 11, 2021
- Preceded by: Julia Lynn

Personal details
- Born: May 22, 1950 (age 76) Wichita, Kansas, U.S.
- Party: Republican
- Spouse: Robert
- Children: 4
- Education: Fort Scott Community College; Central Missouri State University

Beverly Gossage (born May 22, 1950) is an American politician, Medicare/Medicaid insurance broker, and former educator currently serving as a member of the Kansas Senate representing the 9th district in Johnson County, Kansas. A Republican, she was elected in 2020 to succeed retiring senator Julia Lynn. Previously, she had unsuccessfully sought the Republican nomination for Kansas Insurance Commissioner in 2014.

== Early life and education ==
Gossage was born in Wichita, Kansas, to Calvin and LaVaughn Kastl. She earned an associate's degree from Fort Scott Community College, and holds a bachelor's degree in education from Central Missouri State University.

=== Private sector career ===
Gossage worked for eight years as an elementary school teacher. She also worked at Sylvan Learning.

Gossage founded HSA Benefits Consulting, a firm that consults with businesses and individuals regarding health savings accounts. She specialized in consumer driven health plans. She has also served as a consultant with the Show-Me Institute, a conservative think tank based in Missouri.

=== Early political activity ===
Gossage is a Republican, and has described herself as a "free-market conservative" and a "Tea Party grassroots activist".

Gossage was appointed as alternate delegate to the 2012 Republican Convention. The following year, she was appointed as a State Delegate for the Kansas Republican Party.

In 2014, she ran for Kansas Insurance Commissioner. She was unsuccessful in winning the Republican nomination, coming in second place at the primary election. During her campaign, she received endorsements from Newt Gingrich and the Association of American Physicians and Surgeons, as well as several Kansas State Representatives, including Willie Dove, Owen Donohoe, and Amanda Grosserode.

During the 2016 Presidential election, Gossage again served as Republican delegate. During the race, she supported Ted Cruz.

== Senate career ==
Gossage was nominated by Republican precinct members in Kansas's 9th district, and ran against Democrat Stacey Knoell in the 2020 Kansas Senate election. Her hastened campaign preceded a last minute drop-out; incumbent senator Julia Lynn withdrew her campaign due to a family emergency in early September.

For the 2021–2022 legislative session, Gossage was appointed Vice Chairwoman of the Senate Committee on Public Health and Welfare. Additionally, she received the following Senate Committee assignments:

- Financial Institutions and Insurance
- Judiciary
- Education
- Robert G. (Bob) Bethell Joint Committee on Home and Community Based Services and KanCare Oversight

== Personal life ==
Gossage married Robert Gossage in 1969, and had four children. She currently lives in rural De Soto. Robert died of COVID-19 on December 16, 2020.

Kansas Senate
Preceded by Julia Lynn	Kansas Senate Senator for 9th District; January 11, 2021 – Present	Succeeded by Incumbent
