= Mary Pilcher-Cook =

American politician

Member of the Kansas Senate from the 10th district
- In office January 12, 2009 – January 16, 2020
- Preceded by: Nick Jordan
- Succeeded by: Mike Thompson

Member of the Kansas House of Representatives from the 18th district
- In office January 10, 2005 – January 8, 2007
- Preceded by: Cindy Neighbor
- Succeeded by: Cindy Neighbor
- In office January 8, 2001 – January 13, 2003
- Preceded by: Phill Kline
- Succeeded by: Cindy Neighbor

Personal details
- Born: December 23, 1954 (age 71)
- Party: Republican
- Spouse: Don Cook

Mary Pilcher-Cook (born December 23, 1954) is a former Republican member of the Kansas Senate, representing the 10th district from 2009 to 2020. She was a representative on the Kansas House of Representatives from 2000 to 2002 and from 2004 to 2006. She was elected to the Kansas Senate 2008 and re-elected in 2012 and 2016. On December 27, 2019, she announced that she would resign from the Senate effective January 16, 2020, a year before her term expired.

== Committee assignments ==
Pilcher-Cook served on these legislative committees:

- Commerce
- Tax
- Judiciary
- Public Health and Welfare

== Elections ==
=== 2008 ===
The 2008 Republican Primary, Mary Pilcher-Cook defeated State School Board Member Sue Gamble by a 57 to 43 percent margin. On November 4, 2008, Mary Pilcher-Cook was elected to Senate District 10, defeating Democrat Pete Roman by a vote of 19,050 to 13,600, a 54.9 to 45.1 percent margin.

=== 2012 ===
In the 2012 Republican primary, Pilcher-Cook defeated Tom Wertz by a 64 to 36 percent margin. On November 6, 2012, Mary Pilcher-Cook was re-elected to Senate District 10, defeating Democrat Mark J. Greene by a vote of 21,637 to 17,713, a 58 to 42 percent margin.

=== Tenure ===
Mary Pilcher-Cook is a conservative Republican, known for her stance, her efforts to fight ObamaCare, and other fiscally and socially conservative anti-abortion.

In 2011 and 2012, Pilcher-Cook worked towards passage of the Kansas Health Care Freedom Amendment, which would have amended the Kansas Constitution, which failed by one vote due to resistance by the Republican leadership. However, a bill simply placing the same language in statute, called the "Kansas Health Care Freedom Act", was later adopted and was signed into law by Governor Sam Brownback.

Beginning January 14, 2013, she chaired the Public Health and Welfare Committee until February 12, 2016, when she was removed from her chair for a violation of Senate rules, said Senate President Susan Wagle. She is considered one of the most vocal opponents of abortion in the Kansas legislature.

On the 41st anniversary of Roe v. Wade, in 2014, she arranged for a sonogram to take place in the Kansas Statehouse during a meeting of the Senate Public Health and Welfare Committee. The ultrasound procedure was performed on two women by Cindy Patterson, a sonographer with Wyandotte Pregnancy Clinic, a crisis pregnancy center that delivered anti-abortion counseling to women considering abortion.

In January 2014, she introduced Senate Bill 302, which would have made surrogate motherhood a misdemeanor. Under the bill, anyone involved in hiring, or working as, a surrogate could be charged with a misdemeanor, punishable with up to a $10,000 fine and a year in the county jail. The law eventually died in committee.

In 2014, Pilcher-Cook introduced passage of sex education bill after one of her a parent objected to a poster which was placed in a middle school health classroom listing several sex acts. The bill would have required districts to collect signed consent forms from parents if they wanted their child to learn about sexual education.

In 2015, she introduced Senate Bill 56, which would remove legal protections from teachers who showed material that was deemed harmful to minors. The bill quickly became controversial, as opponents claimed the bill was overreaching and would stifle freedom of expression. On 25 February 2015, the bill passed the Senate an amended version of the bill on a 26-14 vote.

On January 11, 2019, Governor Laura Kelly announced that she would appoint David Toland as Kansas Secretary of Commerce following her inauguration on January 14, 2019. Anti-abortion activists attempted to prevent Toland's confirmation due to what they perceived as ties to George Tiller, an assassinated abortion provider from Wichita, Kansas who was killed while ushering in his church in 2009 by anti-abortion extremist Scott Roeder. Supporters of Toland noted that the only tie between the two is a small grant that "Thrive Allen County" obtained from a memorial fund posthumously established in Tiller's name and that Toland's position as Secretary of Commerce would have nothing to do with healthcare services or abortion. The grants in question had been made to assist pregnant women to stop smoking and to provide contraceptive services to low-income women intending to postpone or avoid becoming pregnant. In a hearing by the Commerce Committee held on March 20–21, 2019, Toland expansively answered probing questions from anti-abortion Senators including Pilcher-Cook as well as Molly Baumgardner, about Toland's neighborhood improvement activities in the District of Columbia prior to his return to Kansas. The committee rejected his appointment by a vote of 6-5, sending the nomination to the full senate. Despite personal attacks leveled by conservatives and criticism of health grants from the fund established posthumously and named after Tiller, Toland was confirmed to the position by the Kansas Senate on April 1, 2019, by a vote of 23-14. He received support from all 11 Democratic senators, 11 Republicans, and the Senate's lone independent. Toland survived an effort by the Kansas Republican Party, Kansans for Life, the Koch Industries-funded Americans for Prosperity and others, to derail his nomination.

=== Resignation ===
On Dec. 27, 2019, Pilcher-Cook announced that she would resign from the Senate on Jan. 16, 2020, days after the 2020 Senate session started. Her successor, Mike Thompson, a retired TV meteorologist, was elected by Republican Party precinct committee members in the 10th Senate District, on a vote of 46-0. He served the remainder of her term through January 2021, filed for election to the seat, a race he won.

=== Personal ===
Pilcher-Cook lives in Shawnee, with her husband, Don Cook.
