= Randy Powell (politician) =

American politician

Member of the Kansas House of Representatives from the 30th district
- In office 2015–2018
- Preceded by: Lance Kinzer
- Succeeded by: Brandon Woodard

Personal details
- Party: Republican
- Spouse: Lupita Powell (m. 1984)
- Children: 3

Randy Powell is an American politician who served as a Republican member of the Kansas House of Representatives from 2015 to 2018. He represented the 30th District and lived in Olathe, Kansas.

Powell was elected in 2014, after incumbent Republican Lance Kinzer declined to run for re-election. The primary election pitted Powell against Ron Worley, a former representative for the 30th district who had lost a primary to Kinzer in 2012. Worley was defeated once again, with Powell triumphing with 55% of the primary election vote. The general election was decided by a similar margin, with Powell defeating Democrat Liz Dickinson 57% to 43%. The 2016 results were similar, with Powell winning the primary with 60% of the vote and beating Democrat Darla Graham in the general, 52% to 48%.

Powell declined to run for re-election in 2018, and was succeeded by Democrat Brandon Woodard.

== Personal life ==
Powell was born and raised in Kansas. He married his wife Lupita in 1984, and the couple has three children (Kathleen, Joseph and Michael). Powell is a Christian and is active in his church.
