= David C. Huff =

American politician

David Huff

Member of the Kansas House of Representatives from the 30th district
- In office 1997–2006
- Preceded by: Richard M. Becker
- Succeeded by: Ron Worley

Personal details
- Born: September 13, 1936
- Died: December 12, 2019
- Party: Republican
- Spouse: Patricia Huff

David C. Huff (September 13, 1936–December 12, 2019) was an American politician who served as a Republican member of the Kansas House of Representatives from 1997 to 2006. He represented the 30th District and lived in Lenexa, Kansas.

Huff was elected in 1996 and was re-elected for an additional 5 terms before declining to run for re-election in 2006. He was succeeded by fellow Republican Ron Worley.
