= Keith Esau =

American politician

Member of the Kansas House of Representatives from the 14th district
- In office January 14, 2013 – January 14, 2019
- Preceded by: Lance Kinzer
- Succeeded by: Charlotte Esau

Personal details
- Born: June 10, 1960 (age 66) Buhler, Kansas, U.S.
- Party: Republican
- Spouse: Charlotte Esau

Keith Esau (born June 10, 1960) is an American politician who served as the Kansas State Representative for the 14th district from 2013 to 2019. A member of the Republican Party, his district covers the northern part of Olathe in Johnson County. In 2017, the American Conservative Union gave him a life time rating of 88%.

He unsuccessfully sought the Republican nomination for Secretary of State of Kansas in 2018, placing fifth in a primary election that was won by Scott Schwab. He was succeeded in the state legislature by his wife, Charlotte Esau.

== Sources ==
Kansas House of Representatives
Preceded by Lance Kinzer	Member of the Kansas House of Representatives for District 14; 2013–2019	Succeeded by Charlotte Esau
