= Mike Thompson (Kansas politician, born 1957) =

American politician (born 1957)

Member of the Kansas Senate from the 10th district
- Incumbent
- Assumed office January 21, 2020
- Preceded by: Mary Pilcher-Cook

Personal details
- Born: Michael Lowry Thompson; August 12, 1957 (age 68) Wichita, Kansas, US
- Party: Republican
- Spouse: LeAnne
- Children: 3
- Education: United States Naval Weather Schools

Michael Lowry Thompson (born August 12, 1957) is an American politician, meteorologist and weather forecaster who is currently a member of the Kansas Senate representing the 10th Senate district in Johnson County, Kansas. He was appointed to the senate in January 2020 by Republican Party precinct committee members in the 10th District following the resignation of Mary Pilcher-Cook, and took office on January 21, 2020, following a formal appointment by Governor Laura Kelly.

== Early career ==
Thompson was a longtime weather forecaster for television stations in the Kansas City television market. He was the chief meteorologist for WDAF-TV in Kansas City from January 1992 to December 2018. Prior to WDAF-TV, he was the chief meteorologist for KCTV from 1983 to 1992 as well as a meteorologist for KOKH-TV and KWTV in Oklahoma City, Oklahoma and WPCQ-TV in Charlotte, North Carolina. He studied meteorology in the United States Navy and was a Navy weather forecaster. He grew up in Burlington, Kansas and was born in Wichita. Thompson currently operates a speaking and weather consulting business in the Kansas City region and resides in Shawnee, Kansas.

== Political career ==
Thompson was chosen for his seat in the Kansas Senate by Republican Party precinct committeepersons in Johnson County to complete the final year on Pilcher-Cook's term. He faced an August 2020 Republican primary challenge from Republican state Representative Tom Cox in a campaign for a full four-year term in the Senate. Thompson defeated Cox in the Aug. 4, 2020 Republican primary. Thompson won by a wide margin over Cox, but it was a close race over Shawnee Democratic Councilwoman Lindsey Constance. He won by 51.9% to 48.1%, 22,362 votes to 20,758. In October 2021, Thompson objected to COVID-19 mandates, saying, "I'm absolutely not sure it's safe." Republicans created the "Special Joint Committee on Government Overreach and the Impact of COVID-19 Mandates." Thompson said, "Look at these kids who are in school having to wear the masks." "We know there are adverse effects from that as well, not only from a physical, but also social and emotional standpoint. So there are a lot of parents who are begging school boards to rescind those mask mandates." Thompson questioned the efficacy and safety of the vaccine. He said, "I think we have to look at the safety of this vaccine versus what the real risk of COVID is, and we know for a fact it's a 99.7% recovery rate from COVID in the general population," adding, "Among kids, it's virtually 100%." .

== Committee assignments ==
2020-2021 Kansas Senate Committee Assignments

- Utilities, Chairman
- Local Government
- Transparency and Ethics
- Public Health and Welfare
- Judiciary
