= Stephen Cloud =

American politician

Member of the Kansas House of Representatives from the 30th district
- In office 1981–1986
- Preceded by: Gus Bogina
- Succeeded by: Frank Weimer

Personal details
- Born: March 11, 1949 (age 77)
- Party: Republican

Stephen R. Cloud (born March 11, 1949) is an American politician who served as a Republican member of the Kansas House of Representatives from 1981 to 1986. He represented the 30th District and lived in Shawnee Mission, Kansas.
