= Huff model =

Economic model

In spatial analysis, the Huff model is a widely used tool for predicting the probability of a consumer visiting a site, as a function of the distance of the site, its attractiveness, and the relative attractiveness of alternatives. It was formulated by David Huff in 1963. It is used in marketing, economics, retail research and urban planning, and is implemented in several commercially available GIS systems.

Its relative ease of use and applicability to a wide range of problems contribute to its enduring appeal.

The formula is given as:

$P_{ij}= \frac{A_j^\alpha D_{ij}^{- \beta}} {\sum_{k=1}^{n}A_k^{\alpha} D_{ik}^{- \beta}}$

where :

- $A_j$ is a measure of the attractiveness of store j
- $D_{ij}$ is the distance from the consumer's location, i, to store j.
- $\alpha$ is an attractiveness parameter
- $\beta$ is a distance decay parameter
- $n$ is the total number of stores, including store j
