= Tom Cox (Kansas politician) =

American politician

Member of the Kansas House of Representatives from the 17th district
- In office January 9, 2017 – January 11, 2021
- Preceded by: Brett Hildabrand
- Succeeded by: Jo Ella Hoye

Personal details
- Born: August 3, 1985 (age 40) Shawnee, Kansas, U.S.
- Party: Republican

Tom Cox (August 3, 1985) is an American politician who served as a member of the Kansas House of Representatives, representing the 17th district in Johnson County.

== Career ==
A resident of Shawnee, Kansas, he was elected in 2016 and reelected in 2018. During his tenure, he served as vice chairman of the House Insurance Committee.

He is a graduate of the University of Kansas and has worked in business in Kansas and in San Diego, California. He ran unsuccessfully for the 10th district in the Kansas Senate, challenging Mike Thompson in the August 2020 Republican primary.
