= Kansas's 9th Senate district =

American legislative district

Kansas's 9th State Senate district
Senator
Beverly Gossage; R–Eudora
- Demographics: 79% White; 5% Black; 11% Hispanic; 3% Asian; 2% Other
- Population (2018): 79,805

Kansas's 9th Senate district is one of 40 districts in the Kansas Senate. It was represented by Republican Beverly Gossage since 2021.

== Geography ==
District 9 covers central and northwestern Johnson County in the suburbs of Kansas City, including all of De Soto and parts of Olathe, Lenexa, and Gardner.

The district is located entirely within Kansas's 3rd congressional district, and overlaps with the 14th, 15th, 26th, 30th, 38th, 43rd, 49th, and 121st districts of the Kansas House of Representatives.

== Recent election results ==
=== 2020 ===
After winning the Republican primary unopposed, incumbent Julia Lynn dropped her 2020 bid for re-election citing her sister's health, and was replaced on the Republican line by Beverly Gossage.

2020 Kansas Senate election, District 9
Party	Candidate	Votes	%
Republican	Beverly Gossage	22,450	52.2
Democratic	Stacey Knoell	20,550	47.8
Total votes		43,000	100
Republican hold			

=== 2016 ===
2016 Kansas Senate election, District 9
Party	Candidate	Votes	%
Republican	Julia Lynn (incumbent)	20,574	60.0
Democratic	Chris Morrow	13,708	40.0
Total votes		34,282	100
Republican hold			

=== 2012 ===
2012 Kansas Senate election, District 9
Party	Candidate	Votes	%
Republican	Julia Lynn (incumbent)	19,346	63.8
Democratic	Merlin Ring	10,957	36.2
Total votes		30,303	100
Republican hold			

=== Federal and statewide results ===
Year	Office	Results
2020	President	Trump 50 – 47.5%
2018	Governor	Kelly 49.7 – 41.8%
2016	President	Trump 52.7 – 39.5%
2012	President	Romney 60.1 – 37.6%
