= Dennis Miller (politician) =

American politician

Member of the Kansas House of Representatives from the 14th district
- In office January 9, 2023 – January 13, 2025
- Preceded by: Charlotte Esau
- Succeeded by: Charlotte Esau

Personal details
- Party: Democratic

Dennis Miller is an American politician. He served as a member of the Kansas House of Representatives from 2023 to 2025, representing the 14th district. He is a member of the Democratic Party. After defeating incumbent Republican Charlotte Esau in 2022, he lost re-election to her in 2024.
