= Kansas's 10th Senate district =

American legislative district

Kansas's 10th State Senate district
Senator
Mike Thompson; R–Shawnee
- Demographics: 80% White; 5% Black; 8% Hispanic; 3% Asian; 3% Other
- Population (2018): 73,567

Kansas's 10th Senate district is one of 40 districts in the Kansas Senate. It has been represented by Republican Mike Thompson since his appointment in 2020 to replace fellow Republican Mary Pilcher-Cook.

== Geography ==
District 10 is based in Shawnee in Johnson County, covering the vast majority of the city itself as well as Lake Quivira and parts of Overland Park, Bonner Springs, and Merriam.

The district is located entirely within Kansas's 3rd congressional district, and overlaps with the 17th, 18th, 23rd, 24th, and 39th districts of the Kansas House of Representatives.

== Recent election results ==
=== 2020 ===
In January 2020, 10th district incumbent Mary Pilcher-Cook resigned from the Senate, and local meteorologist Mike Thompson was chosen to fill the remainder of her term.

2020 Kansas Senate election, District 10
Primary election
Party	Candidate	Votes	%
Republican	Mike Thompson (incumbent)	8,183	72.4
Republican	Tom Cox	3,125	27.6
Total votes		11,308	100
General election
Republican	Mike Thompson (incumbent)	22,362	51.9
Democratic	Lindsey Constance	20,758	48.1
Total votes		43,120	100
Republican hold			

=== 2016 ===
2016 Kansas Senate election, District 10
Party	Candidate	Votes	%
Republican	Mary Pilcher-Cook (incumbent)	18,673	51.3
Democratic	Vicki Hiatt	17,722	48.7
Total votes		36,395	100
Republican hold			

=== 2012 ===
2012 Kansas Senate election, District 10
Primary election
Party	Candidate	Votes	%
Republican	Mary Pilcher-Cook (incumbent)	4,514	64.3
Republican	Tom Wertz	2,509	35.7
Total votes		7,023	100
General election
Republican	Mary Pilcher-Cook (incumbent)	19,392	58.2
Democratic	Mark Greene	13,900	41.8
Total votes		33,292	100
Republican hold			

=== Federal and statewide results ===
Year	Office	Results
2020	President	Biden 52.1 – 45.6%
2018	Governor	Kelly 54.0 – 38.4%
2016	President	Trump 48.2 – 44.4%
2012	President	Romney 56.9 – 41.3%
