= Lenexa, Kansas =

City in Johnson County, Kansas, US

- City
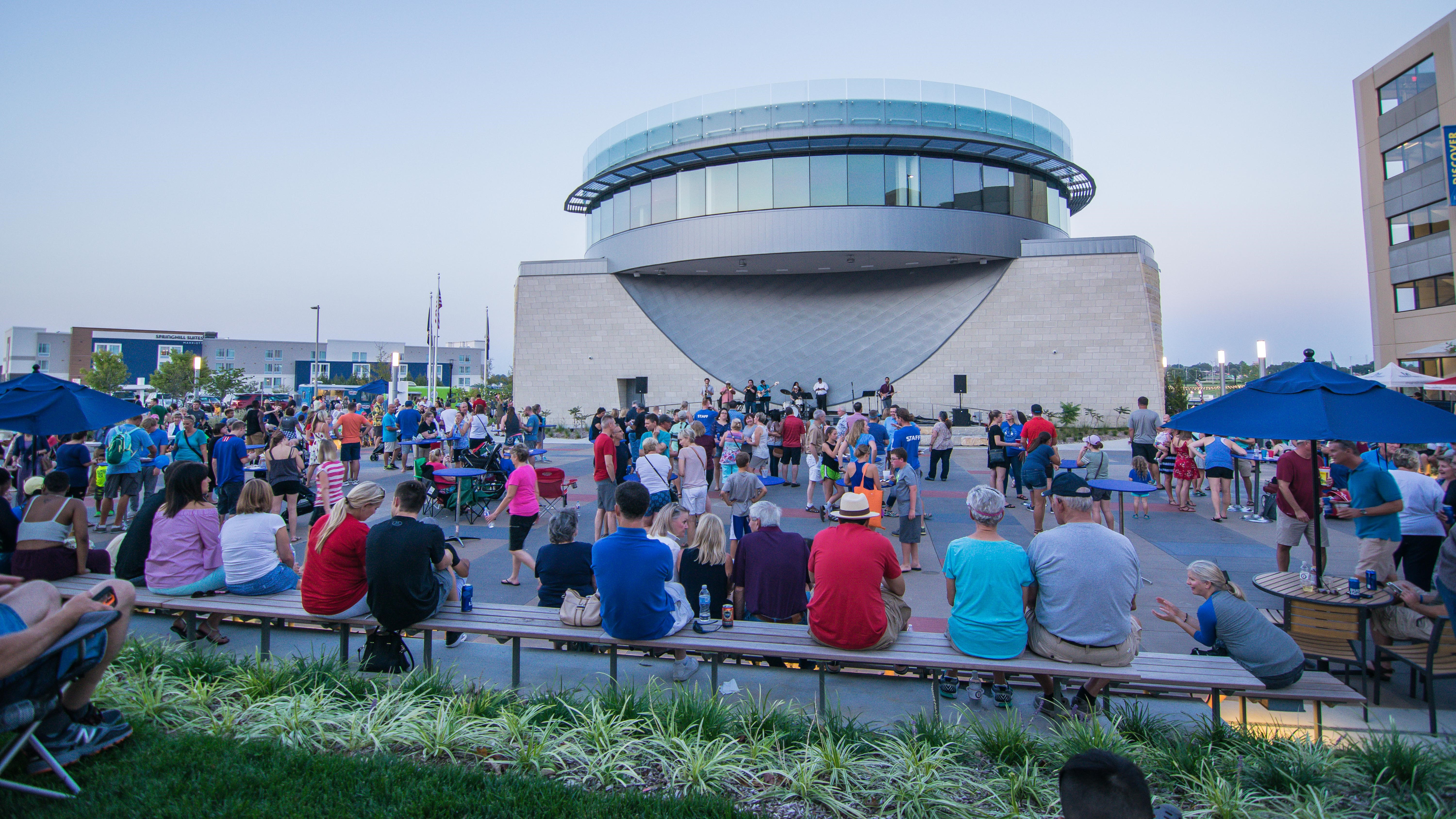
- Lenexa City Center (2017)

- Location within Johnson County and Kansas
- Interactive map of Lenexa, Kansas
- Coordinates: 38°57′58″N 94°44′02″W
- Country: United States
- State: Kansas
- County: Johnson
- Incorporated: 1907

Government
  - Mayor: Julie Sayers
  - City Manager: Beccy Yocham

Area
  - Total: 34.39 sq mi (89.08 km^{2})
  - Land: 34.07 sq mi (88.24 km^{2})
  - Water: 0.32 sq mi (0.83 km^{2}) 1.02%
- Elevation: 873 ft (266 m)

Population (2020)
  - Total: 57,434
  - Density: 1,686/sq mi (650.9/km^{2})
- Time zone: UTC-6 (CST)
  - Summer (DST): UTC-5 (CDT)
- ZIP Codes: 66200-66299
- Area code: 913
- FIPS code: 20-39350
- GNIS ID: 485612
- Website: lenexa.com

Lenexa /lɪˈnɛksə/ is a city in Johnson County, Kansas, United States, and part of the Kansas City metropolitan area. As of the 2020 census, the population of the city was 57,434. making it the ninth-most populated city in Kansas. It is bordered by the cities of Shawnee to the north, Overland Park to the east, De Soto to the west, and Olathe to the south.

== History ==
Twelve years before the town of Lenexa was platted, James Butler Hickok staked a claim on 160 acres (65 ha) at what is now the corner of 83rd St and Clare Road. Filed in 1857, the claim was not far from the Kansas River, and was 20 miles (32 km) southwest of Westport, Missouri, and the start of the Santa Fe Trail. The trail meandered through this area on its way to Santa Fe, New Mexico.

On March 22, 1858, Hickok was elected one of the first four constables of nearby Monticello Township. Later, Hickok became a scout for the Free-State Army, a sharpshooter, and eventually, one of the most famous folk heroes of the American West, Wild Bill Hickok.

At about the same time as Hickok filed his claim, a census of the Shawnee Indians living in the area was being taken, and one of the residents listed was Na-Nex-Se Blackhoof. She was the widow of Chief Blackhoof, the second signer of the 1854 treaty that ceded 1,600,000 acres (650,000 ha) of the Kansas Shawnee Indian reservation to the United States government.

In 1865, the Kansas and Neosho Valley Railroad was organized to take advantage of favorable new land laws. It later changed its name to Missouri River, Ft. Scott and Gulf Railroad, and in 1869 purchased a right-of-way from C.A. Bradshaw in the area that is now Lenexa, with the stipulation that a depot be built on the property.

Bradshaw also sold 10.5 acres (4.2 ha) to Octave Chanute, a railroad civil engineer, who platted the town in 1869. Legend states that the first town name proposed was "Bradshaw", but Bradshaw modestly refused, and the name "Lenexa", a derivation of the name Na-Nex-Se, the wife of Shawnee Chief Black Hoof, was adopted.

== Geography ==
Lenexa is located at 38°57′53″N 94°45′34″W (38.964689, -94.759535). According to the United States Census Bureau, the city has a total area of 34.45 square miles (89.23 km^{2}), of which 0.35 sq mi (0.91 km^{2}) is covered by water.

== Demographics ==
Historical population
| Census | Pop. | Note | %± |
|---|---|---|---|
| 1910 | 583 | | — |
| 1920 | 472 | | −19.0% |
| 1930 | 452 | | −4.2% |
| 1940 | 502 | | 11.1% |
| 1950 | 803 | | 60.0% |
| 1960 | 2,497 | | 211.0% |
| 1970 | 5,242 | | 109.9% |
| 1980 | 18,639 | | 255.6% |
| 1990 | 34,034 | | 82.6% |
| 2000 | 40,238 | | 18.2% |
| 2010 | 48,190 | | 19.8% |
| 2020 | 57,434 | | 19.2% |
| 2023 (est.) | 58,536 | | 1.9% |
U.S. Decennial Census; 2010-2020

=== Racial and ethnic composition ===
Lenexa city, Kansas – Racial and ethnic composition Note: the US Census treats Hispanic/Latino as an ethnic category. This table excludes Latinos from the racial categories and assigns them to a separate category. Hispanics/Latinos may be of any race.
| Race / Ethnicity (NH = Non-Hispanic) | Pop 2000 | Pop 2010 | Pop 2020 | % 2000 | % 2010 | % 2020 |
|---|---|---|---|---|---|---|
| White alone (NH) | 35,217 | 38,837 | 43,591 | 87.52% | 80.59% | 75.90% |
| Black or African American alone (NH) | 1,285 | 2,748 | 3,603 | 3.19% | 5.70% | 6.27% |
| Native American or Alaska Native alone (NH) | 134 | 146 | 149 | 0.33% | 0.30% | 0.26% |
| Asian alone (NH) | 1,445 | 1,805 | 2,367 | 3.59% | 3.75% | 4.12% |
| Native Hawaiian or Pacific Islander alone (NH) | 12 | 37 | 38 | 0.03% | 0.08% | 0.07% |
| Other race alone (NH) | 24 | 146 | 213 | 0.06% | 0.30% | 0.37% |
| Mixed race or Multiracial (NH) | 523 | 961 | 2,683 | 1.30% | 1.99% | 4.67% |
| Hispanic or Latino (any race) | 1,598 | 3,510 | 4,790 | 3.97% | 7.28% | 8.34% |
| Total | 40,238 | 48,190 | 57,434 | 100.00% | 100.00% | 100.00% |

=== 2020 census ===
As of the 2020 census, Lenexa had a population of 57,434, 23,934 households, and 15,432 families. The population density was 1,685.7 per square mile (650.8/km^{2}). The 25,308 housing units had an average density of 742.8 per square mile (286.8/km^{2}), and 5.4% of units were vacant. The homeowner vacancy rate was 1.1% and the rental vacancy rate was 8.0%.

Of the 23,934 households, 27.7% had children under 18. 51.8% were married-couple households, 17.6% had a male householder with no spouse or partner present, and 24.3% had a female householder with no spouse or partner present. About 28.1% of households consisted of individuals, and 9.2% had someone living alone who was 65 or older. The average household size was 2.4 and the average family size was 2.9.

The median age was 38.4 years; 21.7% were under 18, 8.2% from 18 to 24, 28.4% from 25 to 44, 24.8% from 45 to 64, and 17.0% were 65 or older. For every 100 females there were 95.6 males, and for every 100 females age 18 and over there were 93.9 males.

98.8% of residents lived in urban areas, while 1.2% lived in rural areas.

Racial composition as of the 2020 census
| Race | Number | Percent |
|---|---|---|
| White | 44,827 | 78.0% |
| Black or African American | 3,681 | 6.4% |
| American Indian and Alaska Native | 232 | 0.4% |
| Asian | 2,381 | 4.1% |
| Native Hawaiian and Other Pacific Islander | 38 | 0.1% |
| Some other race | 1,650 | 2.9% |
| Two or more races | 4,625 | 8.1% |

=== 2010 census ===
As of the 2010 census 48,190 people, 19,288 households, and 13,065 families were living in the city. The population density was 1,413.2 inhabitants per square mile (545.6/km^{2}). The 20,832 housing units had an average density of 610.9 per square mile (235.9/km^{2}). The racial makeup of the city was 84.4% White, 5.8% African American, 0.4% Native American, 3.8% Asian, 0.1% Pacific Islander, 3.0% from other races, and 2.5% from two or more races. Hispanics or Latinos of any race were 7.3% of the population.

Of the 19,288 households, 33.7% had children under 18 living with them, 55.3% were married couples living together, 9.0% had a female householder with no husband present, 3.4% had a male householder with no wife present, and 32.3% were not families. About 25.2% of all households were made up of individuals, and 7.3% had someone living alone who was 65 or older. The average household size was 2.48 and the average family size was 3.00.

The median age in the city was 36.6 years; 24.7% of residents were under 18; 8.3% were between 18 and 24; 28.2% were from 25 to 44; 28.5% were from 45 to 64; and 10.3% were 65 years of age or older. The gender makeup of the city was 48.7% male and 51.3% female.

=== Education ===
The 2016–2020 5-year American Community Survey estimates show that the percent of those with a bachelor's degree or higher was 39.7% of the population.

=== Income and poverty ===
The 2016–2020 5-year American Community Survey estimates show that the median household income was $90,487 (with a margin of error of +/- $3,777) and the median family income was $110,925 (+/- $4,040). Males had a median income of $59,365 (+/- $4,837) versus $42,653 (+/- $1,613) for females. The median income for those above 16 years old was $49,977 (+/- $2,070). Approximately, 2.8% of families and 5.0% of the population were below the poverty line, including 5.7% of those under 18 and 3.1% of those 65 or over.

=== Ancestry ===
The ancestry of Lenexa in 2020 was 25.5% German, 13.3% Irish, 13.2% English, 3.9% Italian, 2.3% French, 2.1% Scottish, 2.0% Polish, 2.0% Norwegian, and 1.9% sub-Saharan African.

== Economy ==
Lenexa is the birthplace of Garmin and the regional headquarters of Kiewit Construction.

=== Largest employers ===
According to the city's 2015 Comprehensive Annual Financial Report, the largest employers in the city are:

| Rank | Employer | Number of employees |
|---|---|---|
| 1 | United Parcel Service | 2,087 |
| 2 | Quest Diagnostics/Lab One | 1,954 |
| 3 | Kiewit Power Engineers Company | 1,292 |
| 4 | JC Penney Logistics Center | 1,200 |
| 5 | Alliance Data Systems | 730 |
| 6 | Gear for Sports | 600 |
| 7 | Lakeview Village | 586 |
| 8 | Lexmark | 570 |
| 9 | Clinical Reference Lab | 567 |
| 10 | PRA International | 560 |

== Government ==
Lenexa is the home of a records center managed by the National Archives and Records Administration. The facility stores federal records from agencies in Iowa, Kansas, Missouri, and Nebraska, including Department of Veterans Affairs and the Internal Revenue Service. The facility is also known informally as the Caves, and is known to store items from the trauma room at Parkland Memorial Hospital in Dallas, Texas, where John F. Kennedy was pronounced dead following his assassination. As of November 2023, the mayor of Lenexa is Julie Sayers and the city manager is Beccy Yocham.

== Education ==
Lenexa does not have a public school district of its own. Instead, Lenexa students go to either Shawnee Mission School District, Olathe School District, or De Soto School District schools. It is also home to a handful of private schools. Lenexa's first private high school, St. James Academy, opened in 2005. The Johnson County Library has a branch in the Lenexa City Center. Wichita-based Friends University also has a branch in Lenexa. The International Assembly for Collegiate Business Education is based in Lenexa; its competitive peer, the Accreditation Council for Business Schools and Programs, is based in neighboring Overland Park.

== Culture ==
=== Events ===
Each June, the city hosts the Great Lenexa Barbecue Battle, which is also the Kansas state championship. Lenexa was known as the Spinach Capital of the World in the 1930s, and celebrates with the Spinach Festival every September.

=== Religion ===
Lenexa is home to the St. George Serbian Orthodox Church, a parish founded in Kansas City in 1906 and moved to Lenexa in 2006. The parish constructed a new Byzantine style church and cultural center. The church hosts a SerbFest every year in the summer and a Food Festival and Bazaar in the fall.

The Church of the Nazarene, an evangelical Protestant denomination, which was headquartered for many years in Kansas City, moved its international headquarters to Lenexa in 2008.

=== Health care ===
The only hospital in the city is AdventHealth Lenexa City Center.

== Transportation ==
Johnson County Transit provides local bus service in and around the city. The nearest intercity transit services are located at the Kansas City Union Station and Kansas City Bus Station.

== Notable people ==
People who were born in or have lived in Lenexa include:

- Warren Ault (1887–1989), historian
- Cam F. Awesome (born 1988), boxer
- Baron Corbin (born 1984), WWE Wrestler
- Madison Desch (born 1997), gymnast
- Drake Dunsmore (born 1988), football tight end
- Wild Bill Hickok (1837–1876), a gunfighter, staked a claim on 160 acres (0.65 km^{2}) at what is now the corner of 83rd St and Clare Road.
- Lucas Rodríguez (born 1986), soccer midfielder
- Paul Rudd, (born 1969), actor
- William Shaw (born 1955), biochemist, autism researcher
- Grace VanderWaal (born 2004), winner of the 11th season of the NBC TV competition show America's Got Talent
- Jason Wiles (born 1970), an actor, director, and producer, starred as Maurice 'Bosco' Boscorelli (1999–2005) in the television series Third Watch.
- Ron Worley (born 1945), Kansas state legislator

== See also ==
- Lake Lenexa
- Oregon-California Trails Association
