= 177th Information Warfare Aggressor Squadron =

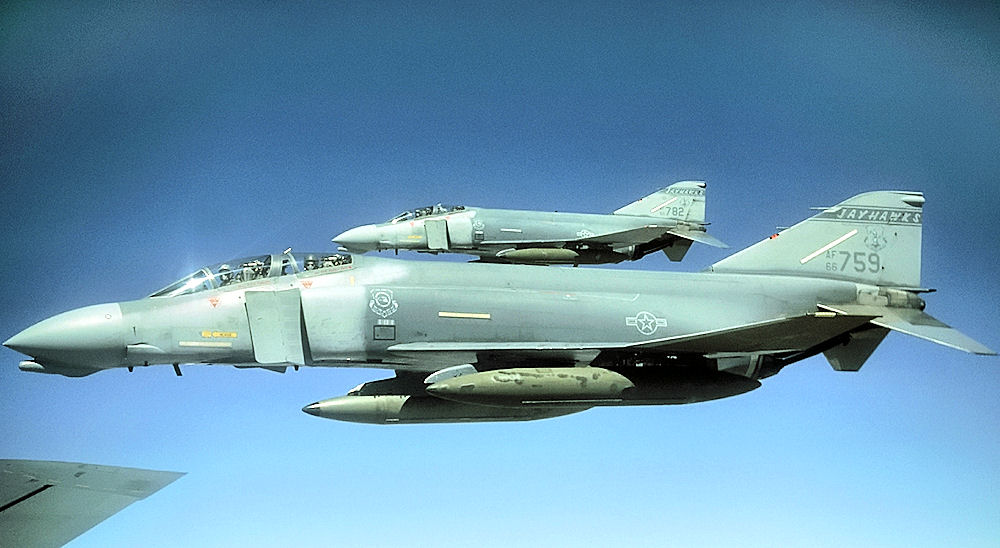
- 177th TFTS F-4D Phantoms, about 1988
- Active: 1984–Present
- Country: United States
- Allegiance: Kansas
- Branch: Air National Guard
- Type: Squadron
- Role: Intelligence, Surveillance, Reconnaissance
- Part of: Kansas Air National Guard
- Garrison/HQ: McConnell Air Force Base, Kansas

Insignia
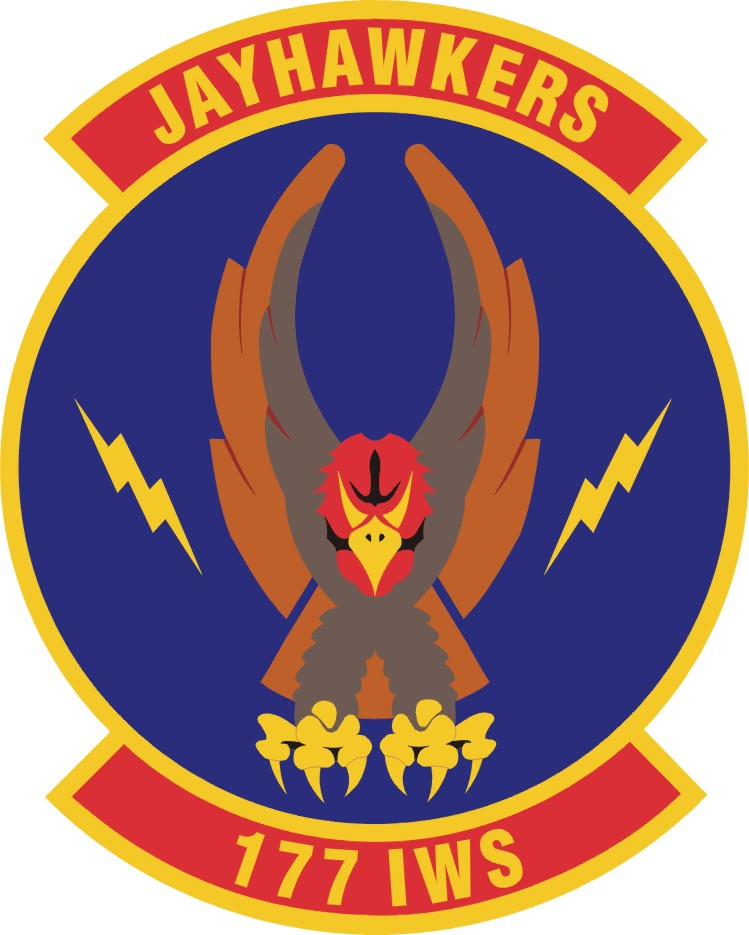
- 177th Information Warfare Aggressor Squadron emblem

The 177th Information Warfare Aggressor Squadron is a unit of the 184th Intelligence Wing of the Kansas Air National Guard stationed at McConnell Air Force Base, Wichita, Kansas. The 177th is a non-flying squadron which trains in cyber warfare.

== Overview ==
The mission of the squadron is to attack American military networks, to discover vulnerabilities before a real enemy does.

The Information Warfare Aggressor role is similar to the "tiger teams" commercial firms hire (and the air force pioneered) to test the defenses of corporate networks. The two aggressor squadrons have increased the quality and quantity of attacks that can be launched against U.S. systems, to see how well the defenses hold up. Members of the squadron then analyze the results of their attack. Finally, the aggressor hackers tell the sysadmins and other concerned personnel of the target unit what they did wrong, and why.

== History ==
On 1 February 1984, the 177th Tactical Fighter Training Squadron was established with the unit flying McDonnell F-4 Phantom IIs as a formal training unit. It conducted its first student training class the same year. The squadron converted to the General Dynamics F-16A Fighting Falcon in 1990 and the F-16CC and F-16Din 1992. It was inactivated on 1 August 1994 when the F-16s were withdrawn from McConnell and its parent group became a bomber unit flying Rockwell B-1B Lancers.

== Lineage ==
- Constituted as the 177th Tactical Fighter Training Squadron and allotted to the National Guard on 1 February 1984

Activated and extended federal recognition on 8 February 1984
Redesignated 177th Fighter Squadron on 16 March 1992
Inactivated on 1 August 1994

- Redesignated: 177th Information Warfare Aggressor Squadron and activated on 30 August 2002

=== Assignments ===
- 184th Tactical Fighter Group (later 184th Fighter Group), 1 February 1984 – 1 August 1994
- 184th Regional Support Group, 30 August 2006 – 2018
- 184th Cyber Operations Group, 2018 - Present

=== Stations ===
- McConnell Air Force Base, Kansas, 1 February 1984 – 1 August 1994
- McConnell Air Force Base, Kansas, 1 August 2002 – present

=== Aircraft ===
- McDonnell F-4D Phantom II, 1984–1990
- Block 1/5 F-16A and F-16B Fighting Falcon, 1990–1992
- Block 25 F-16C and F-16D Fighting Falcon, 1992–1994

== See also ==
- List of cyber warfare forces
