= 161st Intelligence Squadron =

- Active: 2006–present
- Country: United States
- Allegiance: Kansas
- Branch: Air National Guard
- Type: Intelligence
- Part of: 184th Wing
- Garrison/HQ: McConnell Air Force Base, Wichita, Kansas

The 161st Intelligence Squadron (161 IS) is a unit of the 184th Wing of the Kansas Air National Guard stationed at McConnell Air Force Base, Wichita, Kansas. The 161st is a non-flying squadron operating the Distributed Common Ground System.

== History ==
This squadron was Initially constituted and allotted to the Kansas Air National Guard on 29 March 2006. and assigned to the 184th Air Refueling Wing (now 184th Wing) Wing, McConnell Air Force Base. The unit was constituted and allotted to the Kansas Air National Guard on 01 April 2008 as the 161st Intelligence Squadron, falling under Air Combat Command.

On 1 July 2008, the unit was assigned to the 184th Intelligence Group, under the 184th Intelligence Wing, Kansas Air National Guard, McConnell Air Force Base.

The 161st Intelligence Squadron received federal recognition effective 2 June 2010.

== Lineage ==
- The 161st Intelligence Squadron does NOT share the lineage of the 161st Tactical Fighter Training Squadron.

=== Assignments ===
- 184th Air Refueling Wing 29 March 2006-1 April 2008
- 184th Intelligence Wing, 1 April 2008 – 30 June 2008
- 184th Intelligence Group, 1 July 2008 – 31 August 2015
- 184 Intelligence, Surveillance, and Reconnaissance Group (184 ISRG), 1 Sep 2015–present

=== Stations ===
- McConnell Air Force Base, Kansas, 29 March 2006 – Present

=== Aircraft ===
- None
