= Nickell =

Nickell is both a surname and a given name. Notable people with the name include:

- Elizabeth Nickell-Lean, mezzo-soprano
- Francis M. Nickell, American politician
- Joe Nickell, paranormal investigator
- Matt Nickell, American soccer player
- Nick Nickell, American bridge player
- Stella Nickell, American criminal
- Stephen Nickell, British economist and academic
- Nickell Robey, American football player
- Oliver Tree, Musician

== See also ==
- Murder of Rachel Nickell
- Nickell Homestead and Mill, historic site
- Nickell Memorial Armory, in Topeka, Kansas
- Nickell Peak, mountain in Australia
