= 344th Air Refueling Squadron =

US Air Force unit

344th Air Refueling Squadron

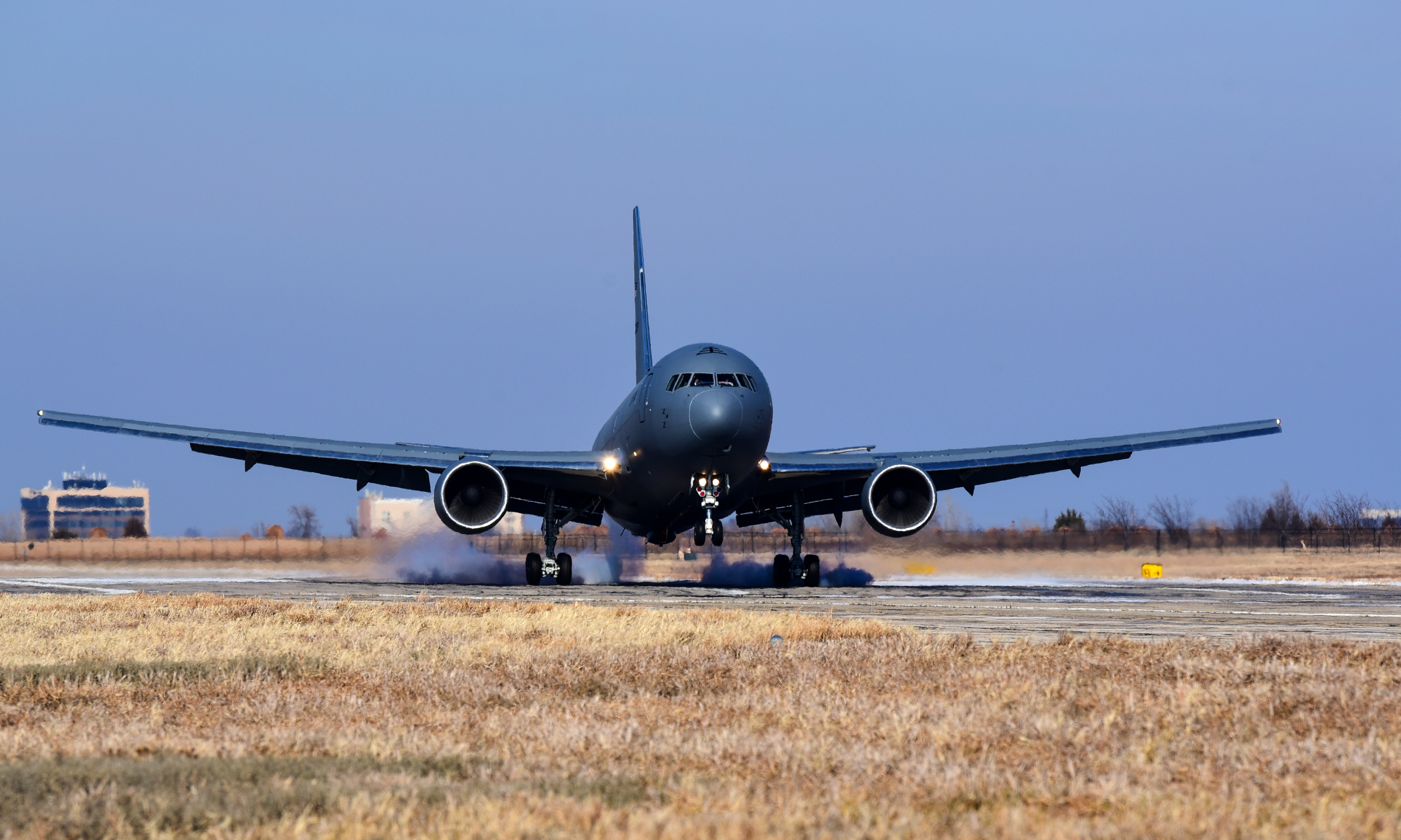
- The first USAF KC-46A Pegasus lands on the flightline 25 January 2019, at McConnell Air Force Base, Kansas.
- Active: 1942–1946; 1947–1966; 1986–present
- Country: United States
- Branch: United States Air Force
- Role: Aerial refueling
- Part of: Air Mobility Command
- Garrison/HQ: McConnell Air Force Base
- Nickname: Eliminators (1956-1966)
- Motto: Anytime-Anywhere (1994–present) Capable – Reliable – Versatile (1987–1994) Hell from the Heavens (1956–1966)
- Decorations: Distinguished Unit Citation; Air Force Outstanding Unit Award; Republic of Korea Presidential Unit Citation

Commanders
- Notable commanders: William Crumm John R. Kane (Note: Col Kane became the commander of the squadron's parent 98th Bombardment Group and was awarded the Medal of Honor while leading the group in Operation Tidal Wave.)

Insignia
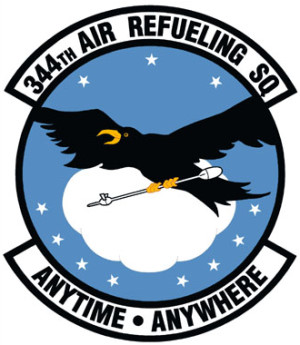
- 344th Air Refueling Squadron emblem (Note: Approved 17 October 1994. Description: Celeste, a raven soaring throughout proper grasping in both feet an air refueling boom Argent surmounting a cloud of the like, between a ring of eleven mullets, three in chief, four in sinister base and four in dexter base of the last [color mentioned], all within a diminished bordure Sable. Endicott, Active Air Force Squadrons, p. 752)

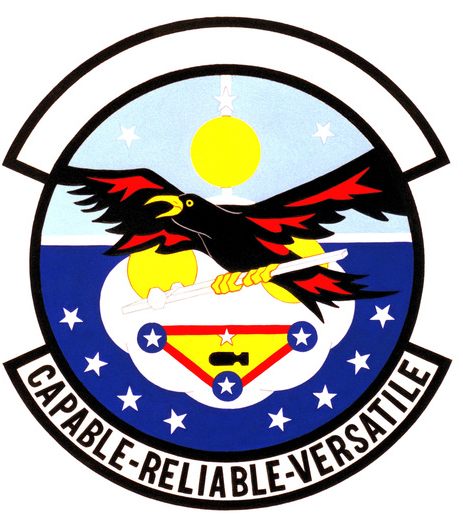
- 344th Air Refueling Squadron emblem (Note: Approved 23 September 1987)

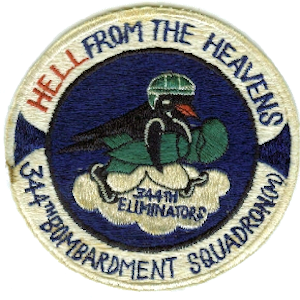
- Patch with 344th Bombardment Squadron emblem (Note: Approved 17 August 1956. Description: On a disc Air Force blue, with white border, edged black, a pugnacious blackbird, with white markings, and a yelklow beak and eye; wearing a helmet, a boxing glove on his right wing, and carrying a bomb under his left wing all green, wearing white trousers and striding rapidly over a white cloud in base; trousers and cloud detail of the first [color mentioned]; all outlines black.)

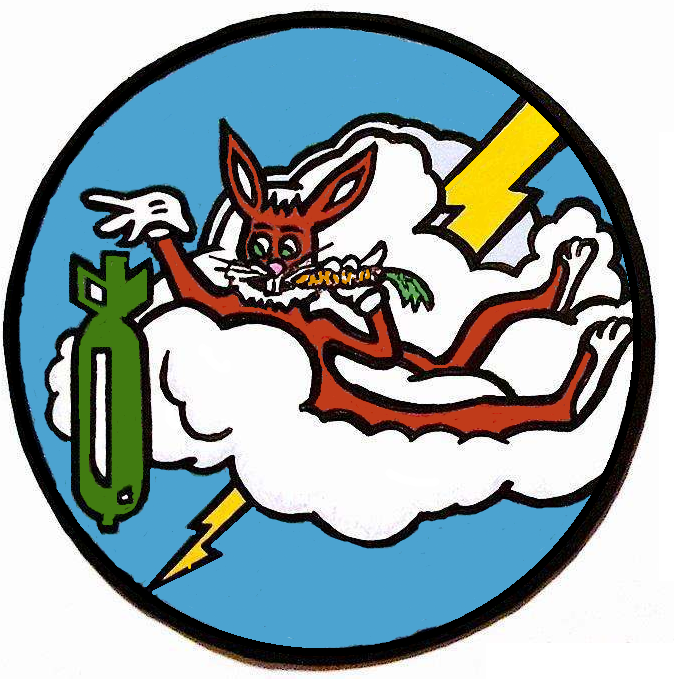
- 344th Bombardment Squadron emblem World War II unofficial

The 344th Air Refueling Squadron is a unit of the US Air Force, part of the 22nd Air Refueling Wing of Air Mobility Command at McConnell Air Force Base, Kansas. It operates the Boeing KC-46 Pegasus aircraft conducting aerial refueling missions.

The squadron was first activated during World War II as the 344th Bombardment Squadron. It saw combat in the Mediterranean Theater of Operations, participating in Operation Tidal Wave, the low level attack on oil refineries near Ploiești, Romania. It earned two Distinguished Unit Citation (DUC)s for its combat operations. After VE Day the squadron returned to the United States and trained with Boeing B-29 Superfortresses until inactivating in spring 1946.

The squadron was reactivated in 1947 with Superfortresses. During the Korean War, it deployed to Japan and earned another DUCn for its combat operations. The squadron returned to the United States and converted to the Boeing B-47 Stratojet, which it flew until inactivating in 1966 when the B-47 was withdrawn from service and Lincoln Air Force Base closed.

In 1986, the squadron was reactivated as the 344th Air Refueling Squadron at Seymour Johnson Air Force Base, North Carolina. It moved to McConnell in 1994.

== Mission ==
The squadron supports worldwide air mobility, special operations, and tactical air operations, providing critical fuel to fighters and bombers. It also has an aeromedical evacuation capability to provide enroute care and transport patients across the globe. As part of the first Boeing KC-46 Pegasus wing, it helps train and develop the operational capabilities of the new tanker.

== History ==
=== World War II ===
==== Training in the United States ====
The squadron was first activated at MacDill Field, Florida as one of the original four squadrons assigned to the 98th Bombardment Group. The 344th soon moved to Barksdale Field, Louisiana, where it began to train as a Consolidated B-24 Liberator heavy bomber squadron under Third Air Force.

The squadron's training was short and it deployed to Egypt in July 1942 over the South Atlantic Ferrying Route transiting from Morrison Field, Florida though the Caribbean Sea to Brazil. It made the Atlantic crossing from Brazil to Liberia, then transited east across central Africa to Sudan. The air echelon of the group reformed with the ground echelon which traveled by the SS Pasteur around the Cape of Good Hope, joining with the air echelon of the squadron, the 343d Bombardment Squadron and group headquarters at St Jean d'Acre Airfield, in Palestine.

==== Combat in the Middle East ====
Upon arrival in the Near East, the squadron became part of United States Army Middle East Air Force, which was replaced by Ninth Air Force in November. It entered combat in August, attacking shipping and harbor installations to cut Axis supply lines to North Africa. It also bombed airfields and rail transit lines in Sicily and mainland Italy. The squadron moved forward with Ninth Air Force to airfields in Egypt; Libya and Tunisia supporting the British Eighth Army in the Western Desert Campaign. Its support of this campaign earned the squadron the Distinguished Unit Citation.

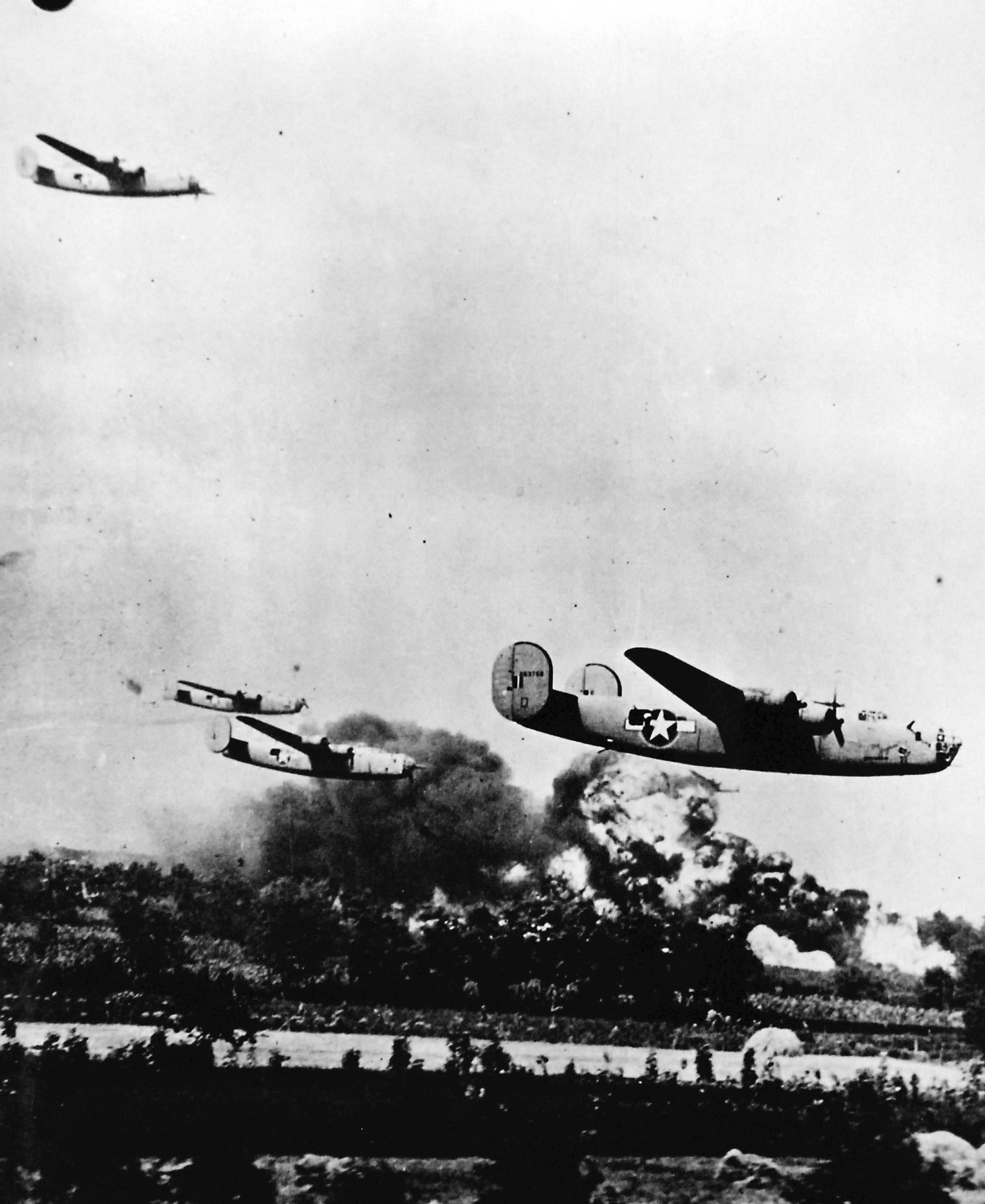
98th Group Liberators attacking Ploiești (Note: In the foreground is Consolidated B-24D-1-CF, serial 42-63758 Li’l Jughaid. Following in formation are Daisy Mae and Black Magic in the 1 August 1943 low level attack on Ploesti. Baugher, Joe (4 March 2023). "1942 USAF Serial Numbers". Joe Baugher.)

On 1 August 1943, the squadron participated in Operation Tidal Wave, the low-level raid on oil refineries near Ploiești, Romania. Alerted to the vulnerability of the Ploiești refineries by a June 1942 raid by the HALPRO project, the area around Ploesti had become one of the most heavily defended targets in Europe. The squadron pressed its attack on the Asta Romana Refinery through smoke and fire from bombing by another group's earlier attack and heavy flak defenses. The squadron's actions in this engagement earned it a second Distinguished Unit Citation.

When the forces driving East from Egypt and Libya met up with those moving westward from Algeria and Morocco in Tunisia in September 1943, Ninth Air Force was transferred to England to become the tactical air force for the invasion of the European Continent. The squadron, along with all Army Air Forces units in North Africa became part of Twelfth Air Force. In November 1943, the squadron moved to Brindisi Airport, Italy, where it became part of Fifteenth Air Force, which assumed control of strategic operations in the Mediterranean Theater of Operations, while Twelfth became a tactical air force.

==== Strategic operations in Italy ====
The squadron continued strategic bombardment raids on targets in Occupied France, southern Germany, Czechoslovakia, Hungary, Austria and targets in the Balkans. These included industrial sites, airfields, harbors and lines of communication. Although focusing on strategic bombing, the squadron was sometimes diverted to tactical operations, supporting Operation Shingle, the landings at Anzio and the Battle of Monte Cassino. In the summer of 1944, the squadron supported Operation Dragoon, the invasion of southern France. The unit also assisted the Soviet advance into the Balkans, and supported Yugoslav Partisans and guerillas in neighboring countries.

==== Return to the United States ====
The squadron returned to the United States in May 1945. Upon arrival it was redesignated as a very heavy Boeing B-29 Superfortress squadron and began training for deployment to the Pacific to conduct strategic bombardment raids on Japan. In November 1945, the 98th Group was inactivated and the squadron moved to Merced Army Air Field, California, where it was assigned to the 444th Bombardment Group, where it replaced the 678th Bombardment Squadron, which was converted into a reconnaissance unit. The squadron was inactivated at what was now Castle Field in March 1946.

=== Strategic Air Command ===
==== Reactivation ====
The squadron was reactivated in 1947 as a Strategic Air Command (SAC) Superfortress unit at Spokane Army Air Field, Washington. The squadron performed strategic bombardment training missions until the outbreak of the Korean War.

==== Korean War ====
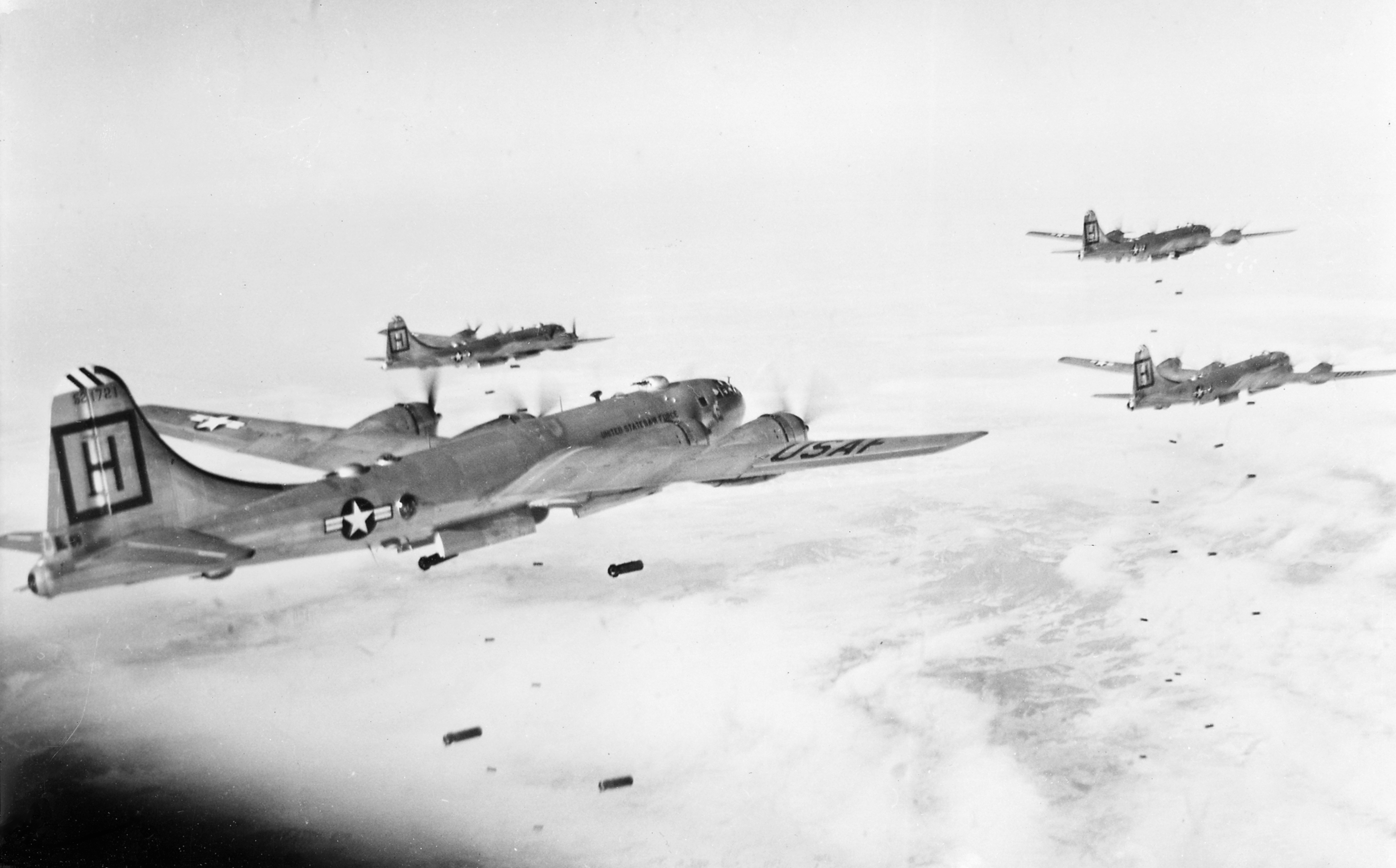
98th Group B-29s attacking a target in Korea (Note: In the foreground is Boeing B-29-90-BW Superfortress, serial 45-21721, which crashed after takeoff eight kilometers north of Yokota Air Base, Japan, on 7 February 1952. The crew of 13 were killed. Baugher, Joe (4 March 2023). "1945 USAF Serial Numbers". Joe Baugher.)

In the summer of 1950, when the Korean War began, the 19th Bombardment Wing was the only medium bomber unit available for combat in the Pacific. In August, SAC dispatched the squadron and other elements of the 98th Bombardment Group to Yokota Air Base, Japan to augment FEAF Bomber Command, Provisional. The group flew its first combat mission on 7 August against marshalling yards near Pyongyang, capital of North Korea. The squadron's missions focused on interdiction of enemy lines of communications, attacking rail lines, bridges and roads. The squadron also flew missions that supported United Nations ground forces.

SAC’s mobilization for the Korean War highlighted that SAC wing commanders were not sufficiently focused on combat operations. Under a plan implemented for most wings in February 1951 and finalized in June 1952, the wing commander focused primarily on the combat units and the maintenance necessary to support combat aircraft by having the combat and maintenance squadrons report directly to the wing and eliminating the intermediate group structures. This reorganization was implemented in April 1951 for the 98th Bombardment Wing, when wing headquarters moved on paper to Japan, taking over the personnel and functions of the 98th Group, which became a paper organization, and the squadron began operating under wing control.

Starting in January 1952, the threat posed by enemy interceptors forced the squadron to fly only night missions. The unit flew its last mission, a propaganda leaflet drop, on the last day before the armistice was signed. Onnce the truce began, the squadron conducted training missions and remained in combat ready status in Japan until July 1954 when it moved to Lincoln Air Force Base, Nebraska.

==== Conversion to jet bombers ====
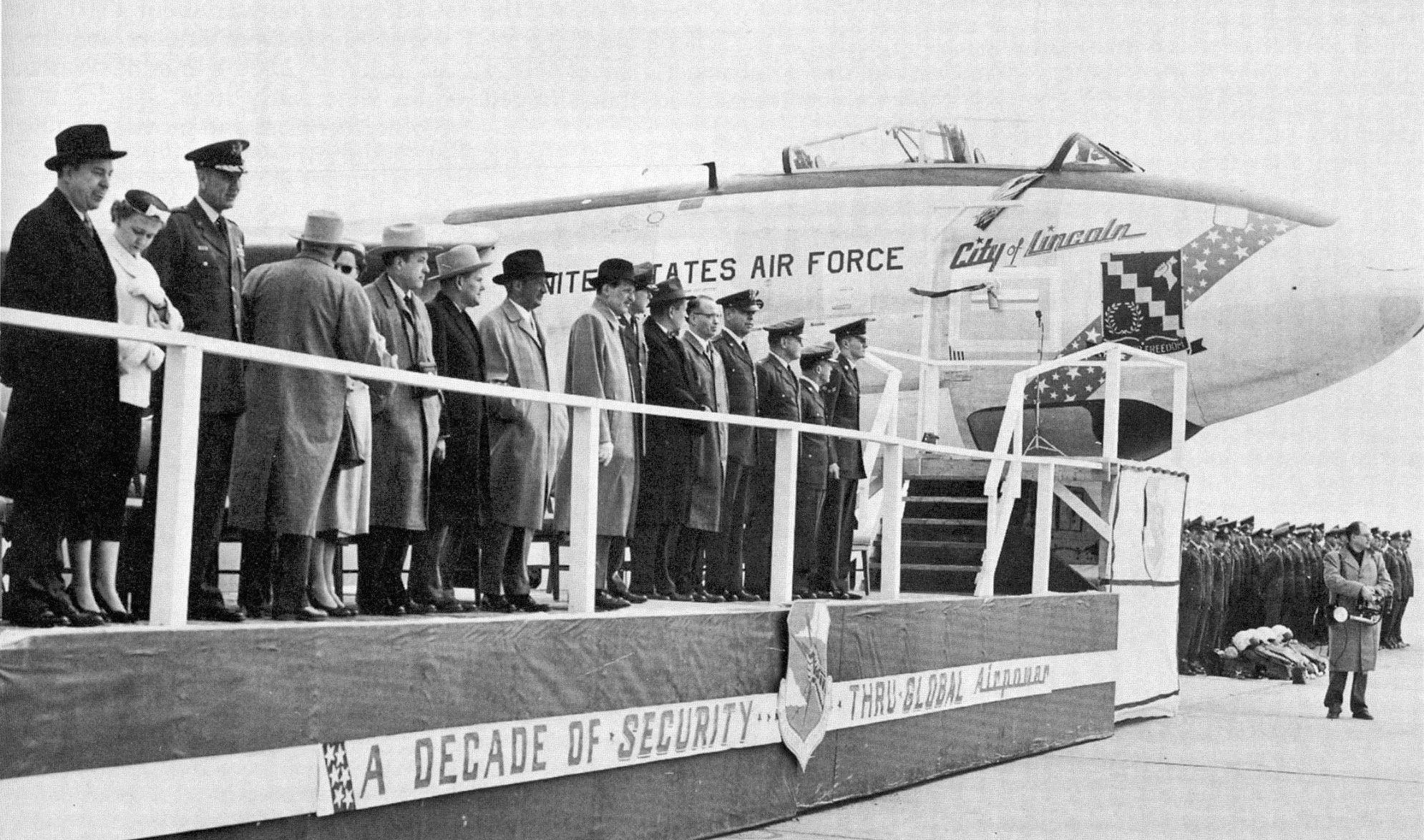
Dedication of first Boeing B-47 at Lincoln AFB (Note: Aircraft is Douglas Aircraft built Boeing B-47E-55-DT, serial 53-2134. City of Lincoln. This plane crashed on landing at RAF Greenham Common on 5 February 1963. Baugher, Joe (2 April 2023). "1953 USAF Serial Numbers". Joe Baugher.)

The squadron disposed of its B-29s to storage at Davis–Monthan Air Force Base, Arizona. At Lincoln, the squadron was equipped with new Boeing B-47E Stratojets. it engaged in strategic bombardment training with the B-47 throughout the rest of the 1950s, into the early 1960s. From November 1955 through January 1966, the squadron deployed to RAF Lakenheath.

From 1958, the 344th began to assume an alert posture at its home base, reducing the amount of time spent on alert at overseas bases to meet General Thomas S. Power's initial goal of maintaining one third of SAC’s planes on fifteen minute ground alert, fully fueled and ready for combat to reduce vulnerability to a Soviet missile strike. The alert commitment was increased to half the squadron's aircraft in 1962.

==== Cuban Missile Crisis ====
Soon after detection of Soviet missiles in Cuba, on 22 October 1962 the squadron's B-47s dispersed. On 24 October the 344th went to DEFCON 2, placing all its aircraft on alert. Most dispersal bases were civilian airfields with AF Reserve or Air National Guard units. The unit's B-47s were configured for execution of the Emergency War Order as soon as possible after dispersing. On 15 November 1/6 of the squadron's dispersed B-47s were recalled to Lincoln. The remaining B-47s and their supporting tankers were recalled on 24 November. On 27 November SAC returned its bomber units to normal alert posture.

The squadron was inactivated in June 1966 with the phaseout of the B-47 and closure of Lincoln.

=== Air refueling ===
The squadron was redesignated the 344th Air Refueling Squadron and activated in May 1986 at Seymour Johnson Air Force Base, North Carolina, where it was equipped with McDonnell Douglas KC-10 Extenders. The squadron was assigned to SAC's 68th Air Refueling Wing until 1991 when the Objective Wing organization, which called for one wing to control all units an each base, was implemented and the 68th Wing was inactivated. The squadron transferred to the 4th Operations Group as the 4th Wing added the air refueling mission to its fighters. After the formation of Air Mobility Command (AMC) in 1992, the squadron moved to McConnell Air Force Base, Kansas and became part of AMC's 22nd Operations Group, flying Boeing KC-135 Stratotankers.

On 25 January 2019, McConnell received the first two of a planned 36 Boeing KC-46 Pegasus aircraft that will eventually replace the KC-135 as the primary Air Force tanker aircraft. On 4 June 2019 the 344th performed the first KC-46 Pegasus initial operations testing and evaluation flight, refueling two General Dynamics F-16 Fighting Falcon aircraft four times with around 29,000 pounds (13,000 kg) of fuel.

== Lineage ==
- Constituted as the 344th Bombardment Squadron (Heavy) on 28 January 1942

Activated on 3 February 1942
Redesignated 344th Bombardment Squadron, Heavy on 1 July 1943
Redesignated 344th Bombardment Squadron, Very Heavy on 23 May 1945
Inactivated on 27 March 1946
Activated on 1 July 1947
Redesignated 344th Bombardment Squadron, Medium on 28 May 1948
Discontinued and inactivated, on 25 June 1966
Redesignated 344th Air Refueling Squadron, Heavy on 7 May 1986
Activated on 1 October 1986
Redesignated 344th Air Refueling Squadron on 1 July 1992

=== Assignments ===
- 98th Bombardment Group, 3 February 1942
- 444th Bombardment Group, 10 November 1945 – 27 March 1946
- 98th Bombardment Group, 1 July 1947 (attached to 98th Bombardment Wing after 1 April 1951)
- 98th Bombardment Wing, 16 June 1952
- 98th Strategic Aerospace Wing, 1 February 1964 – 25 June 1966
- 68th Air Refueling Wing, 1 October 1986
- 4th Operations Group, 22 April 1991
- 22nd Operations Group, 29 April 1994 – present

=== Stations ===
- MacDill Field, Florida, 3 February 1942
- Barksdale Field, Louisiana, c. 9 February 1942
- Page Field, Florida, 30 March 1942
- Drane Field, Florida, 17 May 1942 – 3 July 1942
- RAF Ramat David, British Palestine, 25 July 1942
- St Jean d'Acre Airfield, Palestine, 21 August 1942
- RAF Kabrit, Egypt, 11 November 1942
- Lete Airfield, Libya, 4 March 1943
- Hergla Airfield, Tunisia, 24 September 1943
- Brindisi Airport, Italy, 18 November 1943
- Manduria Airfield, Italy, 19 December 1943
- Lecce Airfield, Italy, 18 January 1944 – 19 April 1945
- Fairmont Army Air Field, Nebraska, 8 May 1945
- McCook Army Airfield, Nebraska, 25 June 1945
- Merced Army Air Field (later Castle Field), California, 10 November 1945 – 27 March 1946
- Andrews Field, Maryland, 1 July 1947
- Spokane Army Air Field (later, Spokane Air Force Base; Fairchild Air Force Base), Washington, 24 September 1947 (deployed to Kadena Air Base, Okinawa, 22 August–7 December 1948; RAF Sculthorpe, England, 25 May – 29 August 1949)
- Yokota Air Base, Japan, c. 5 August 1950 – 22 July 1954 (deployed until 14 August 1953, then permanently stationed)
- Lincoln Air Force Base, Nebraska, 24 July 1954 – 25 June 1966 (deployed to RAF Lakenheath, England, 12 November 1955 – 28 January 1956)
- Seymour Johnson Air Force Base, North Carolina, 1 October 1986
- McConnell Air Force Base, Kansas, 29 April 1994 – present

=== Aircraft ===
- Consolidated B-24 Liberator, 1942–1945
- Boeing B-29 Superfortress, 1945, 1947–1954
- Boeing B-47 Stratojet, 1954–1966
- McDonnell Douglas KC-10 Extender, 1986–1993
- Boeing KC-135 Stratotanker, 1994 – 2017
- Boeing KC-46 Pegasus 2017 – present

=== Awards and campaigns ===
Award streamer	Award	Dates	Notes
	Distinguished Unit Citation	August 1942–17 August 1943	North Africa and Sicily 344th Bombardment Squadron
	Distinguished Unit Citation	1 August 1943	Ploesti, Romania, 344th Bombardment Squadron
	Distinguished Unit Citation	1 December 1952–30 April 1953	Korea, 344th Bombardment Squadron
	Air Force Meritorious Unit Award	1 August 2013–31 July 2014	344th Air Refueling Squadron
	Air Force Meritorious Unit Award	1 August 2017–31 July 2018	344th Air Refueling Squadron
	Air Force Meritorious Unit Award	1 August 2018–31 July 2020	344th Air Refueling Squadron
	Air Force Outstanding Unit Award	1 July 1964–1 June 1965	344th Bombardment Squadron
	Air Force Outstanding Unit Award	[1 October 1986]–30 June 1987	344th Air Refueling Squadron
	Air Force Outstanding Unit Award	2 April 1989-1 April 1991	344th Air Refueling Squadron
	Air Force Outstanding Unit Award	23 April 1991-31 March 1993	344th Air Refueling Squadron
	Air Force Outstanding Unit Award	1 June 1994-31 May 1996	344th Air Refueling Squadron
	Air Force Outstanding Unit Award	24 March-10 June 1999	344th Air Refueling Squadron
	Air Force Outstanding Unit Award	1 August 1999-31 July 2000	344th Air R+efueling Squadron
	Air Force Outstanding Unit Award	1 August 2000-31 July 2001	344th Air Refueling Squadron
	Air Force Outstanding Unit Award	1 August 2002-31 July 2004	344th Air Refueling Squadron
	Air Force Outstanding Unit Award	1 August 2004-31 July 2005	344th Air Refueling Squadron
	Air Force Outstanding Unit Award	1 August 2005–31 July 2006	344th Air Refueling Squadron
	Air Force Outstanding Unit Award	1 August 2006–31 July 2008	344th Air Refueling Squadron
	Air Force Outstanding Unit Award	1 August 2008–31 July 2009	344th Air Refueling Squadron
	Air Force Outstanding Unit Award	1 August 2011–31 July 2012	344th Air Refueling Squadron
	Air Force Outstanding Unit Award	1 August 2012–31 July 2013	344th Air Refueling Squadron
	Republic of Korea Presidential Unit Citation	[7 August] 1950–27 July 1953	Korea, 344th Bombardment Squadron (Note: AFHRA adjusted the start date for this award to agree with the squadron's first combat mission.)

Campaign Streamer	Campaign	Dates	Notes
	Antisubmarine	3 February 1942–3 July 1942	344th Bombardment Squadron (Note: Robertson lists this as a service streamer, rather than a campaign streamer. However, American Campaign credit without participation in the Antisubmarine Campaign was only awarded after a full year service in theater.)
	Air Combat, EAME Theater	7 August 1942–11 May 1945	344th Bombardment Squadron
	Air Offensive, Europe	7 August 1942–5 June 1944	344th Bombardment Squadron
	Egypt-Libya	7 August 1942–12 February 1943	344th Bombardment Squadron
	Tunisia	12 November 1942–13 May 1943	344th Bombardment Squadron
	Sicily	14 May 1943–17 August 1943	344th Bombardment Squadron
	Naples-Foggia	18 August 1943–21 January 1944	344th Bombardment Squadron
	Anzio	22 January 1944–24 May 1944	344th Bombardment Squadron
	Rome-Arno	22 January 1944–9 September 1944	344th Bombardment Squadron
	Central Europe	22 March 1944–21 May 1945	344th Bombardment Squadron
	Normandy	6 June 1944–24 July 1944	344th Bombardment Squadron
	Northern France	25 July 1944–14 September 1944	344th Bombardment Squadron
	Southern France	15 August 1944–14 September 1944	344th Bombardment Squadron
	North Apennines	10 September 1944–4 April 1945	344th Bombardment Squadron
	Rhineland	15 September 1944–21 March 1945	344th Bombardment Squadron
	Po Valley	3 April 1945–8 May 1945	344th Bombardment Squadron
	UN Defensive	7 August 1950–15 September 1950	344th Bombardment Squadron
	UN Offensive	16 September 1950–2 November 1950	344th Bombardment Squadron
	CCF Intervention	3 November 1950–24 January 1951	344th Bombardment Squadron
	1st UN Counteroffensive	25 January 1951–21 April 1951	344th Bombardment Squadron
	CCF Spring Offensive	22 April 1951–9 July 1951	344th Bombardment Squadron
	UN Summer-Fall Offensive	9 July 1951–27 November 1951	344th Bombardment Squadron
	Second Korean Winter	28 November 1951–30 April 1952	344th Bombardment Squadron
	Korea Summer-Fall 1952	1 May 1952–30 November 1952	344th Bombardment Squadron
	Third Korean Winter	1 December 1952–30 April 1953	344th Bombardment Squadron
	Korea Summer-Fall 1953	1 May 1953–27 July 1953	344th Bombardment Squadron

== See also ==
- B-24 Liberator units of the United States Army Air Forces
- List of B-29 Superfortress operators
- List of B-50 units of the United States Air Force
- List of B-47 units of the United States Air Force
