= 184th Wing =

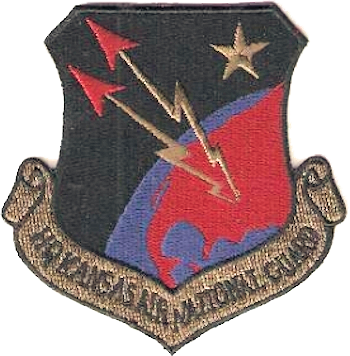
184th Wing
- Active: 1962-present
- Country: United States
- Allegiance: Kansas
- Branch: Air National Guard
- Type: Wing
- Role: Intelligence analysis and information protection
- Part of: Kansas Air National Guard
- Garrison/HQ: McConnell Air Force Base, Kansas
- Nickname: "Jayhawks" "Fighting Jayhawks"

Commanders
- Current commander: Colonel David Hewlett

Insignia
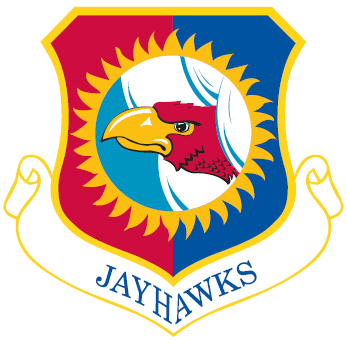
- 184th Intelligence Wing emblem

The 184th Wing is a unit of the Kansas Air National Guard, stationed at McConnell Air Force Base, Wichita, Kansas. If activated to federal service, the Wing is gained by the United States Sixteenth Air Force.

The 127th Command and Control Squadron assigned to the Wing's 184th Regional Support Group, is a descendant organization of the 127th Observation Squadron, established on 30 July 1940. It is one of the 29 original National Guard Observation Squadrons of the United States Army National Guard formed before World War II.

== Overview ==
The Kansas Air National Guard's 184th Intelligence Wing, Wichita, officially changed its name 1 August 2019 to the 184th Wing.

In April 2008 the 184th Intelligence Wing became the first Intelligence Wing in the Air National Guard. The Wing encompasses a variety of missions at the federal, state, and community levels.

- Federal: providing combat support for our nation—Guardsmen from our wing provide wartime support in the form of collecting and analyzing intelligence. Some unit members deploy overseas to augment active duty forces.
- State: support to civil authority—The unit's primary responsibility is to the state of Kansas to assist civil authorities during natural disasters and civil strife in our state.
- Community—Members of the 184th add value to our local communities by holding an annual science and technology camp for local kids (called STARBASE), hosting games of the Kansas Special Olympics, and volunteering in various charitable activities.

== Units ==
The 184 Wing consists of the following units:

- 184th Intelligence Group

161st Intelligence Squadron
184th Intelligence Support Squadron

- 184th Mission Support Group (MSG)
- 184th Regional Support Group (RSG)

127th Command and Control Squadron
Smoky Hill Air National Guard Range
177th Information Aggressor Squadron

- 184th Medical Group

== History ==
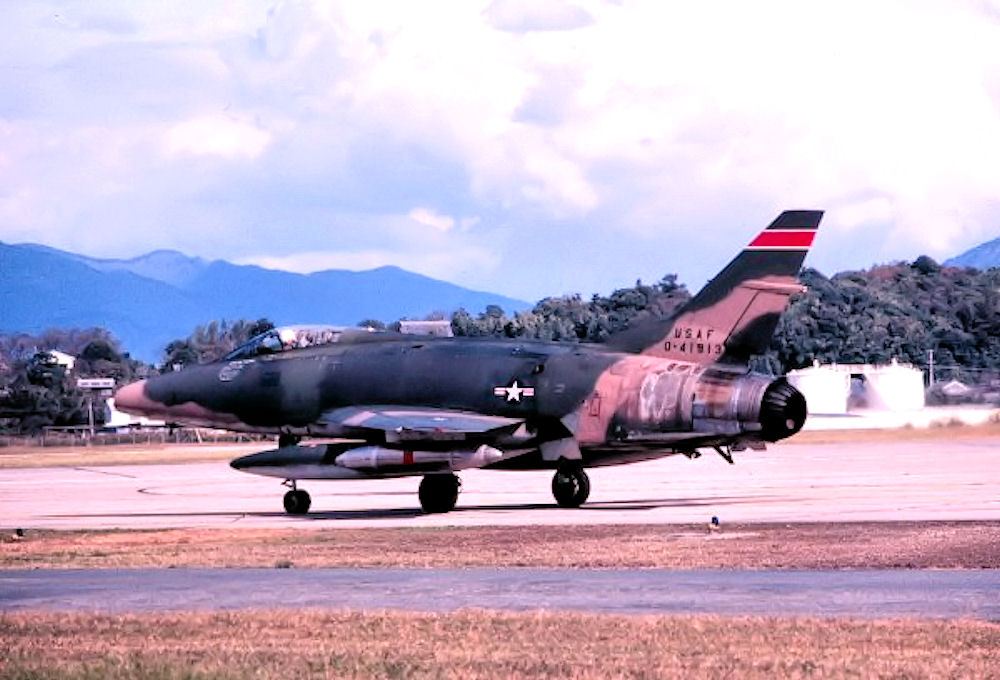
127th TFS F-100C Super Sabre 54–1913, 1968

On 1 October 1962, the Kansas Air National Guard 127th Tactical Fighter Squadron was authorized to expand to a group level, and the 184th Tactical Fighter Group was established by the National Guard Bureau. The 127th TFS becoming the group's flying squadron. Other squadrons assigned into the group were the 184th Headquarters, 184th Material Squadron (Maintenance), 184th Combat Support Squadron, and the 184th USAF Dispensary.

In January 1968, following North Korea's seizure of the USS Pueblo, the 127th TFS was ordered to extended active duty, and deployed to Kunsan Air Base, South Korea and assigned to the PACAF 354th Tactical Fighter Wing at Kunsan Air Base, South Korea. As a result of this federalization, the 184th TFG was placed in a non-operational status. The 127th was released from active duty in June 1969, being returned to Kansas state control. When returned to the 184th TFG, the group was returned to operational status.

On 25 March 1971, the 184th was designated the 184th Tactical Fighter Training Group and acquired the F-105 Thunderchief aircraft, receiving Vietnam War returning aircraft. As the USAF Combat Crew Training School, the unit conducted pilot training in the F-105 for nine years. On 1 October 1973, the 184th assumed the responsibility of operating and maintaining the Smoky Hill Weapons Range at Salina, Kansas. With over 36,000 acres, Smoky Hill is the Air National Guard's largest weapons range.

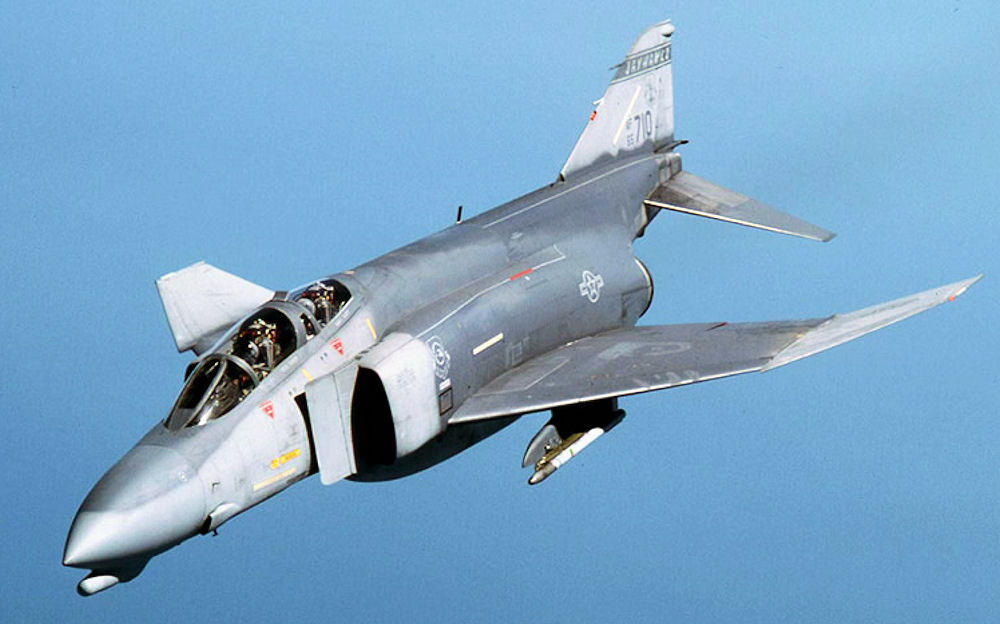
184th TFG F-4D Phantom II 66–0710, 1986

On 7 August 1979, the unit received its first F-4D Phantom II, and on 8 October 1979, was designated as the 184th Tactical Fighter Group, equipped with 50 F-4D's. In April 1982, the 184th was tasked to develop a F-4D Fighter Weapons Instructor Course to meet the needs of the Air Reserve Forces and the USAF Tactical Air Command.

In January 1987, the 184th was tasked to activate a squadron of F-16A/B Fighting Falcon aircraft, and conduct conversion and upgrade training in the F-16. On 8 July 1987, the 161st Tactical Fighter Training Squadron was established as the third flying squadron at the 184th TFG. Formal activation ceremonies for the 161st occurred on 12 September 1987, with the unit flying 10 F-16s and conducting its first student training class. A third training squadron, the 177th Tactical Fighter Training Squadron was activated on 1 February 1984.

In August 1988, the 127th Tactical Fighter Squadron graduated its final Fighter Weapons Instructor Course Class. The 127th TFS converted as the second F-16 training squadron. The last F-4D departed from the 184th TFG on 31 March 1990. The first F-16C Fighting Falcon arrived at the 184th TFG in July 1990.

=== Post Cold War era ===
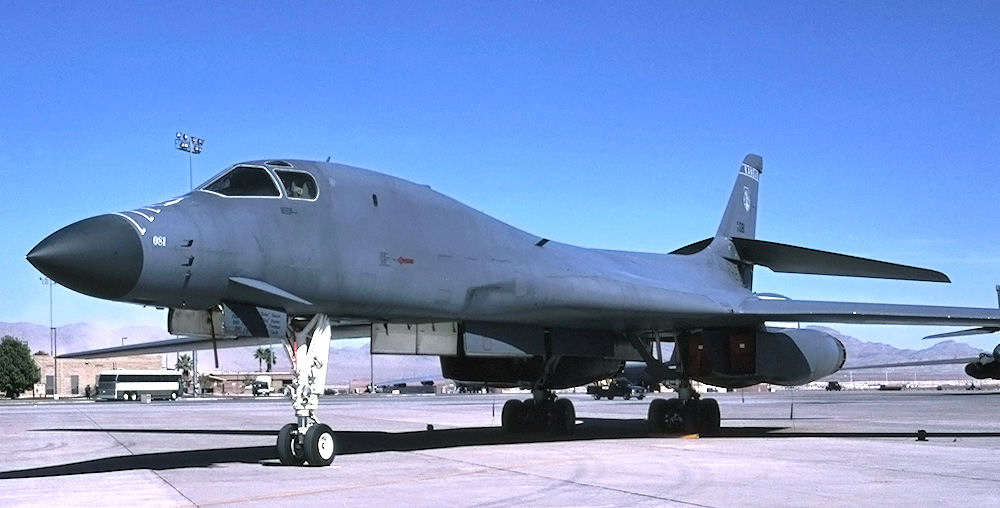
184th Bomb Wing Rockwell B-1B Lancer Lot IV 85–0081, 2000

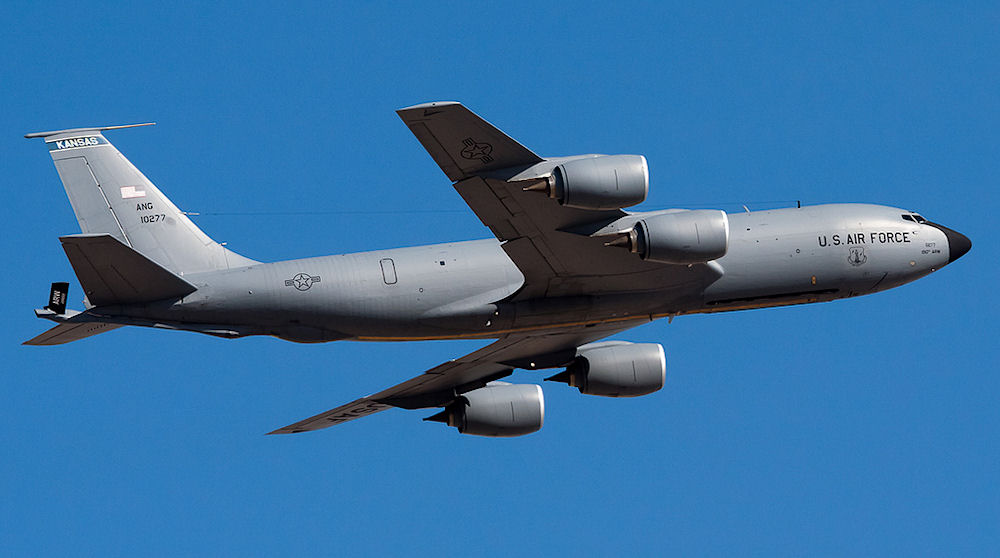
184th ARW KC-135A 61–0277, 2002

In July 1993, the 184th Fighter Group changed gaining commands and became part of the new Air Education and Training Command. In July 1994, the 184th Fighter Group was designated at the 184th Bomb Wing and again became part of the Air Combat Command, flying the Rockwell B-1B Lancer. The 184th was the first Air National Guard unit to fly bombers. The 127th Bomb Squadron received its B-1Bs from the former 28th Bomb Squadron/384th Bomb Wing at McConnell. With the receipt of the B-1, the 161st and 177th Fighter Squadrons were inactivated.

In order to save money, the USAF agreed to reduce its active fleet of B-1Bs from 92 to 60 aircraft. The first B-1B was flown to storage at AMARC on 20 August 2002. In total, 24 B-1Bs were consigned to storage at AMARC, with ten of these being retained in "active storage" which means that they could be quickly returned to service should circumstances dictate. The remaining 14 in storage at AMARC will be scavenged for spare parts to keep the remainder flying. The remaining 8 aircraft to be withdrawn from service were placed on static display at various museums. In exchange for retiring its B-1s, the 184th was redesigned the 184th Air Refueling Wing on 16 September 2002, flying the KC-135R tanker. In addition to the tanker mission, the 184th also took on several new missions within the information operations mission set.

=== BRAC 2005 ===
In its 2005 BRAC Recommendations, DoD recommended to realign McConnell Air National Guard (ANG) Base by relocating the 184th Air Refueling Wing (ANG) nine KC-135R aircraft to the 190th Air Refueling Wing at Forbes Field AGS, which would retire its eight assigned KC-135E aircraft. The 184th Air Refueling Wing 's operations and maintenance manpower would transfer with the aircraft to Forbes. Realigning ANG KC-135R aircraft from McConnell to Forbes would replace the 190th's aging, higher maintenance KC-135E aircraft with newer models while retaining the experienced personnel from one of the highest-ranking reserve component tanker bases.

In June 2007, the 190 ARW gained custody of all KC-135R aircraft from the 184th ARW. This action consolidated all of the Kansas ANG's KC-135R assets into a single wing located at Forbes Field. In April 2008, the 184th Air Refueling Wing was designated the 184th Intelligence Wing making it the first Intelligence Wing in the Air National Guard. With the loss of the flying mission the "Flying Jayhawks" are now the "Fighting Jayhawks".

=== Lineage ===
- Constituted as the 184th Tactical Fighter Group and allotted to the Air National Guard on 11 September 1962

Extended federal recognition and activated on 1 October 1962
Status changed to Nonoperational, 26 January 1968
Status returned to operational, 18 June 1969
Redesignated 184th Tactical Fighter Training Group on 25 March 1971
Redesignated 184th Tactical Fighter Group on 8 October 1979
Redesignated 184th Fighter Group on 16 March 1992
Redesignated 184th Bomb Group on 1 July 1994
Redesignated 184th Bomb Wing on 1 October 1995
Redesignated 184th Air Refueling Wing on 16 September 2002
Redesignated 184th Intelligence Wing on 1 April 2008
Redesignated 184th Wing on 1 August 2019

=== Assignments ===
- 140th Tactical Fighter Wing, 1 October 1962
- 832nd Air Division, 15 June 1968
- 140th Tactical Fighter Wing, 30 April 1969
- Kansas Air National Guard, 1 March 1994 – present

Gained by Tactical Air Command
Gained by Air Combat Command, 1 June 1992
Gained by Air Education and Training Command, 1 July 1993
Gained by Air Combat Command, 1 July 1994
Gained by Air Mobility Command, 16 September 2002
Gained by Air Force Intelligence, Surveillance and Reconnaissance Agency, 1 April 2008-present

=== Components ===
Groups

- 184th Cyberspace Operations Group,
- 184th Intelligence Group (later 184th Intelligence, Surveillance and Reconnaissance Group), 1 April 2008 – present
- 184th Medical Group,
- 184th Mission Support Group,
- 184th Operations Group, 1 October 1995 – 1 April 2008
- 184th Regional Support Group, 1 April 2008 – present

Operational squadrons

- 127th Tactical Fighter Squadron (later 127th Tactical Fighter Training, 127th Fighter, 127th Bomb, 127th Air Refueling, 127th Command and Control), 1 October 1962 – 29 September 2014
- 161st Tactical Fighter Training Squadron (later 161st Fighter Squadron), 12 September 1987 – 1 August 1994
- 177th Tactical Fighter Training Squadron (later 177th Fighter Squadron), 1 February 1984 – 1 August 1994

=== Stations ===
- McConnell Air Force Base, Kansas, 1 October 1962 – present

=== Aircraft ===
- F-100C Super Sabre, 1962–1971
- F-105 Thunderchief, 1971–1979
- F-4D Phantom II, 1979–1987
- F-16A/B Fighting Falcon, 1987–1990
- F-16C/D Fighting Falcon, 1990–1994
- Rockwell B-1B Lancer, 1994–2002
- KC-135R Stratotanker, 2002-2007
