= 127th Command and Control Squadron =

Former unit of the Kansas Air National Guard

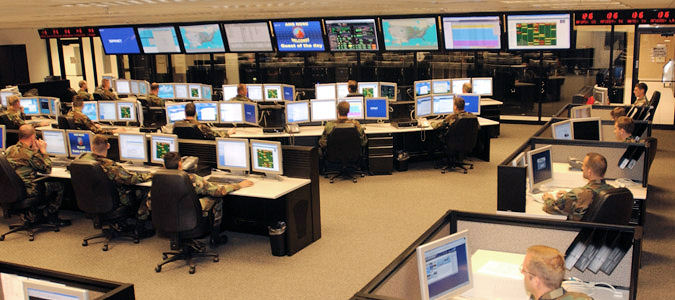
- 127th Command and Control Squadron – Distributed Common Ground System
- Active: 1940–1945; 1946–1952; 1952–2014
- Country: United States
- Branch: Air National Guard
- Type: Squadron
- Role: Intelligence

Insignia
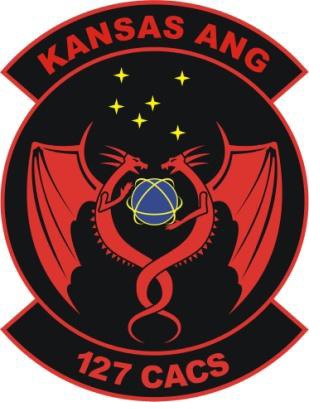
- 127th Command and Control Squadron emblem

- 127th Fighter Squadron emblem (Note: Approved 6 July 1949.)

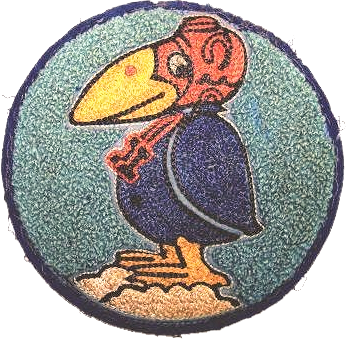
- Patch with 127th Observation Squadron emblem

The 127th Command and Control Squadron was a unit of the Kansas Air National Guard 184th Intelligence Wing stationed at McConnell Air Force Base, Kansas. The 127th was a non-flying squadron operating the Distributed Common Ground System, providing communication and intelligence support to federal, state, and local agencies. The unit was inactivated on 29 September 2014.The squadron is a descendant organization of the Kansas National Guard 127th Observation Squadron, established on 30 July 1940, and is one of the 29 original National Guard Observation Squadrons of the United States Army National Guard formed before World War II. During the war, the unit served in the China Burma India Theater, cooperating with the British Army on photographic, reconnaissance, evacuation, and supply missions as the 127th Liaison Squadron (Commando).Following the war, the squadron was redesignated as a fighter unit and returned to Kansas as part of the Kansas Air National Guard. It was federalized during the Korean War and deployed to Neubiberg Air Base, West Germany, before transitioning through several designations during the Cold War, operating aircraft including the F-51D Mustang, F-84 Thunderjet, F-100C Super Sabre, F-105 Thunderchief, F-4D Phantom II, and F-16 Fighting Falcon. The unit was again activated in 1968 and deployed to Kunsan Air Base, South Korea, following the USS Pueblo seizure.In 1994, the squadron was redesignated the 127th Bomb Squadron, becoming the first Air National Guard unit to fly the Rockwell B-1B Lancer bomber. Following the 2005 Base Realignment and Closure (BRAC) process, the squadron's KC-135R tanker aircraft were transferred to the 190th Air Refueling Wing, and the unit transitioned to an intelligence role as the 127th Command and Control Squadron in 2008 before its final inactivation in 2014.

== Mission ==
The mission of the 127th was to provide communication support to the U.S. Government at all levels, including United States Department of Defense, Department of Homeland Security, Federal Emergency Management Agency, state, and local agencies. These agencies are provided redundant communities during Peace Time, Natural Disasters and National Emergencies. Equipment utilized in support of the mission is flexible and state of the art, enabling the 127th to provide services in a full spectrum of situations.

== History ==
Established on 30 July 1940 as the 127th Observation Squadron, and activated in August 1941. Initially the squadron had 115 men in its ranks. It was, however, still short of officers since it only had nine officers but was authorized a total of thirty-one. Moved to Sherman Field at Fort Leavenworth, by November 1941 the squadron had one BC-1, one North American O-47A, one Douglas O-38E and several L-1 Vigilants. All of the aircraft were single engine observation/liaison planes.

=== World War II ===
The 127th was ordered to federal service on 6 October 1941, became a training unit for observation and liaison pilots. According to the original plans, the squadron was to be based at Brownwood Army Air Field, Texas until the "emergency" was over and it could return to its home base at Wichita. The 7 December 1941 Japanese attack on Pearl Harbor changed all plans for American military units. A number of 127th personnel were off the base that Sunday (7 December) and returned to find it almost impossible to get back on base. The squadron was moved to Tullahoma Army Air Base, Tennessee.

Tullahoma Army Air Base was situated in close proximity to Camp Forrest, Tennessee, a major infantry center. Trained on missions cooperating with the 33d and 80th Infantry divisions, both of which were stationed in the vicinity. At the same time the 124th Observation Squadron from the Iowa National Guard was stationed at Tullahoma. Beginning in 1942, the squadron was assigned to the 75th Observation Group (headquartered in Birmingham, Alabama) for its higher headquarters. The squadron left Tullahoma on 5 September 1942, for Barksdale Field, Louisiana to participate in the largest war games ever staged by the United States Army. During the Louisiana Maneuvers the 127th worked in close cooperation with their 75th Group headquarters.

On 19 August 1943, the 127th was reassigned to the I Air Support Command (headquarters at Morris Field, North Carolina). This command would soon become the I Tactical Air Division. Beginning in April 1944 the squadron received indications that it would not remain a training organization much longer. On 10 November 1944, three years after mobilization, the squadron left the United States for India. It arrived at Bombay, India on 10 December 1944, being assigned to the Tenth Air Force in the China Burma India Theater.

Squadron pilots were constantly involved in duties supporting the British Army. Their missions included such activities as photographic and reconnaissance duties, evacuation of wounded, supply drops, courier duties, and cargo flights. They were entrusted with secret messages, regular mail and with transporting fresh blood to the front. Their operations were directed from the Tactical Air Command headquarters of the XV Corps of the British Army (their actual higher headquarters in this period was the 2d Air Commando Group). The 127th Liaison Squadron (Commando) cooperated with the British Army from the beginning of the Burma offensive in February until the latter part of April 1945. Through this campaign, every pilot that participated (with one exception) flew sufficient hours and missions to entitle him to an Air Medal with one Oak Leaf Cluster, the Distinguished Flying Cross, and most of the pilots were eligible for a second Oak Leaf Cluster to the Air Medal. After the end of the war, was moved to Okinawa where the unit was inactivated.

=== Kansas Air National Guard ===
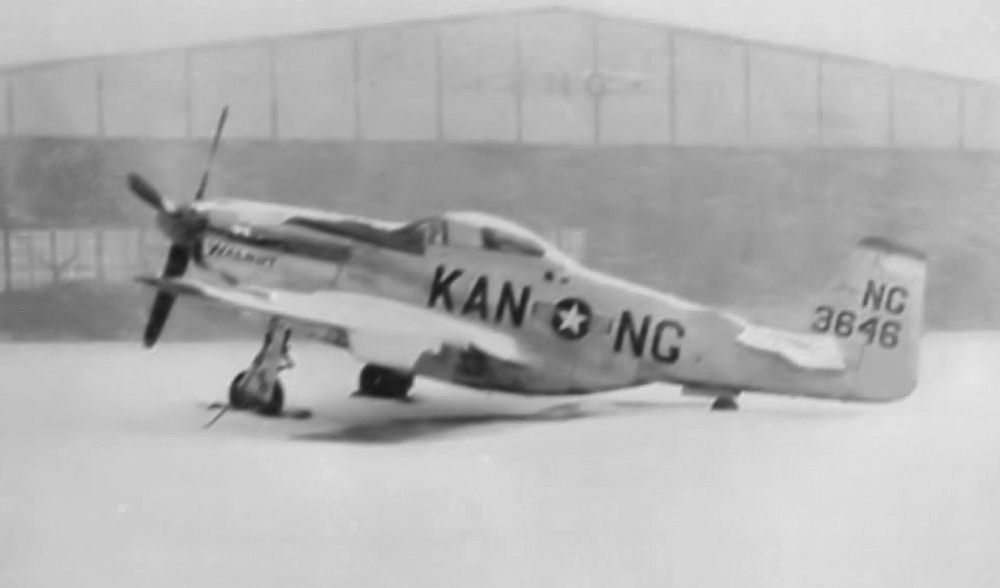
127th Fighter Squadron F-51D 44-13646, about 1947

The squadron was redesignated the 127th Fighter Squadron and allotted to the National Guard on 24 May 1946. It was organized at Wichita Army Air Field, and was extended federal recognition on 7 September 1946. The 127th was equipped with F-51D Mustangs and was assigned to the Missouri ANG 131st Fighter Group, however it was placed under the Kansas Military Department for operational control. The F-51 was flown until December 1949, when the unit received the F-84C Thunderjet fighter.

==== Korean War activation ====
The 127th was federalized on 10 October 1950 due to the Korean War. It was assigned to the federalized Oklahoma ANG 137th Fighter-Bomber Group and equipped with F-84G Thunderjets. Along with the Oklahoma ANG 125th Fighter Squadron and Georgia ANG 128th Fighter Squadron, the 137th Fighter-Bomber Wing was scheduled for deployment to the new Chaumont-Semoutiers Air Base, France, as part of the United States Air Forces in Europe (USAFE).

By 27 November, the 137th Wing assembled at Alexandria Air Force Base, Louisiana for conversion training in the newer F-84Gs. Deployment of the wing was delayed, however, by the need to transfer pilots to Korea from training and delays in receiving engines for the F-84Gs, as well as the ongoing construction at Chaumont. Training and delays continued throughout 1951. Due to these delays, many of the activated National Guard airmen were released from active duty and never deployed to France.

With mostly regular Air Force personnel and all the delays behind them, the remaining Guardsmen departed Louisiana on 5 May 1952 for Europe, however, the 128th inherited a base that was little more than acres of mud where wheat fields used to be. The only hardened facilities at Chaumont was a concrete runway and a handful of tarpaper shacks. The 127th wound up being stationed by USAFE at Neubiberg Air Base, West Germany until the facilities in France were suitable for military use. The aircraft arrived at Chaumont on 25 June, being the first USAF tactical air fighters to be based permanently in France, albeit working mostly in tents and temporary wooden buildings on their new base.

The Guardsmen of the 127th ended their active-duty tour in France and returned to the United States in late June, leaving their F-84 Thunderjets in Europe. The squadron was inactivated and returned to the Air National Guard on 10 july.

==== Cold War ====
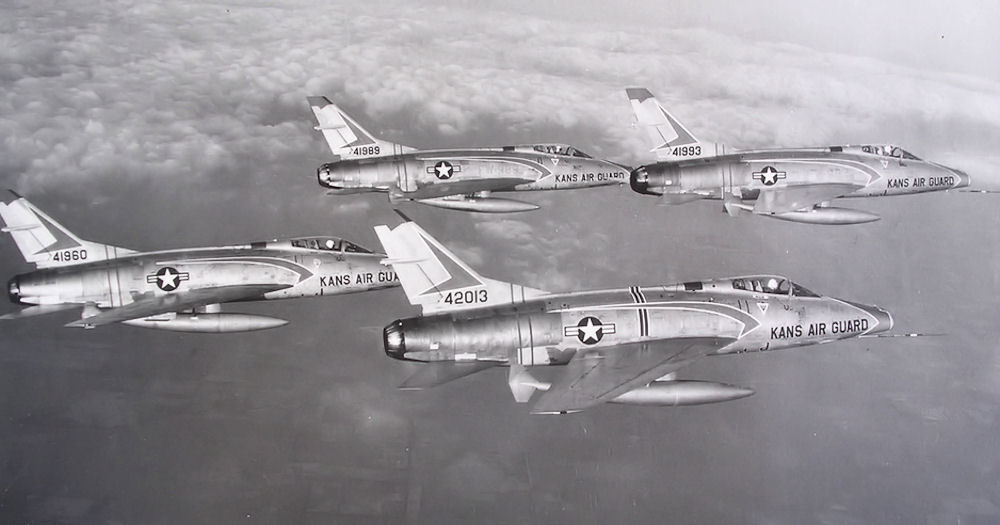
127th TFS F-100C 4-ship formation, about 1961

Upon its return to Wichita, the 127th Fighter-Bomber Squadron was again assigned F-51D aircraft due to the shortage of jets created by the Korean War.

In June 1954, F-80C Shooting Star jet fighters were assigned, followed by designation of the unit to the 127th Fighter Interceptor Squadron, and assignment of the F-86L Sabre all-weather interceptor in January 1958 being used in an air defense mission for Air Defense Command.

The unit converted to the F-100C Super Sabre, and was designated the 127th Tactical Fighter Squadron in April 1961, being gained by Tactical Air Command upon mobilization. On 1 October 1962, the 127th was authorized to expand to a group level, and the 184th Tactical Fighter Group was established. The 127th became the group's flying squadron. Other elements assigned into the group were the 184th group headquarters, 184th Material Squadron (maintenance and supply), 184th Combat Support Squadron, and the 184th USAF Dispensary.

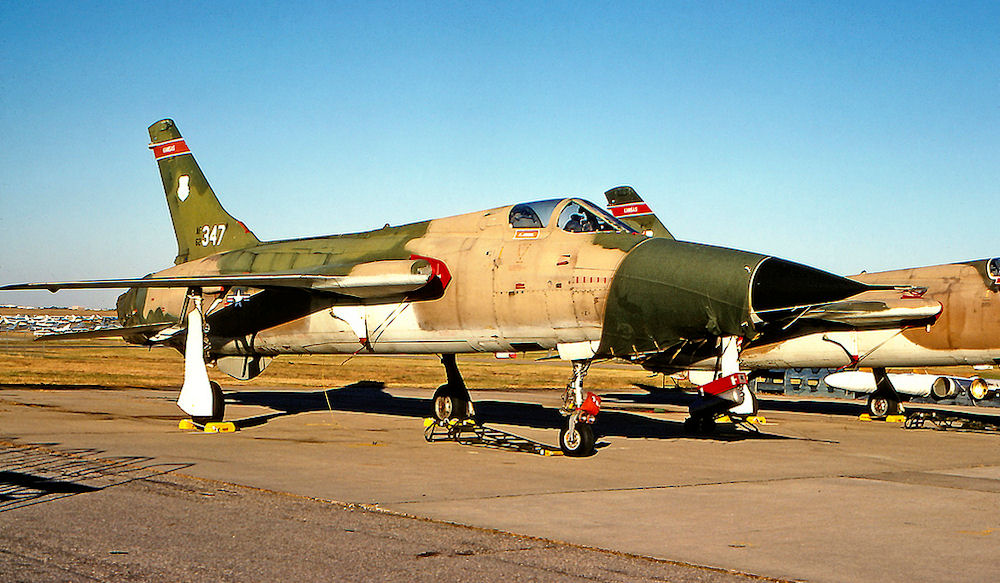
Republic F-105G 63-8347, 1971

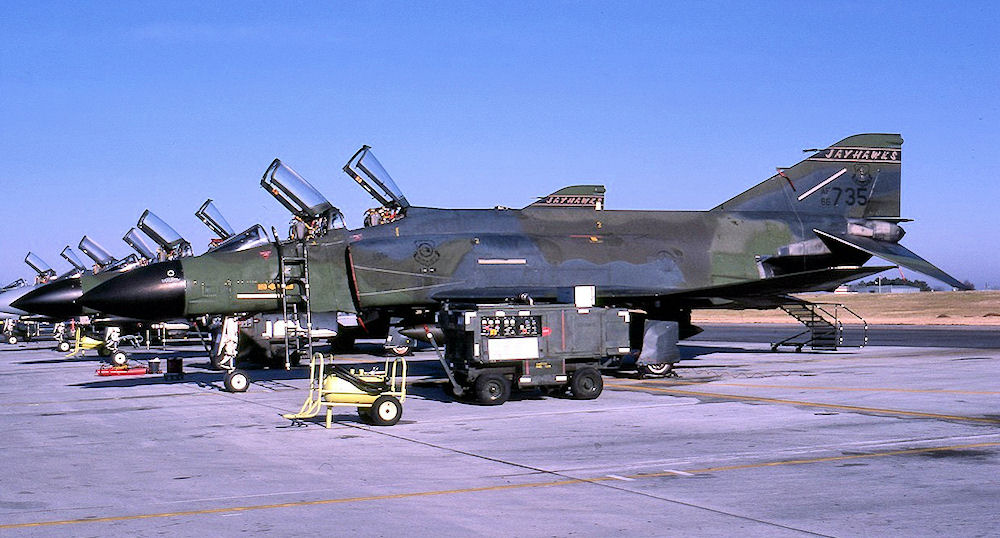
127th TFS McDonnell F-4Ds, about 1984

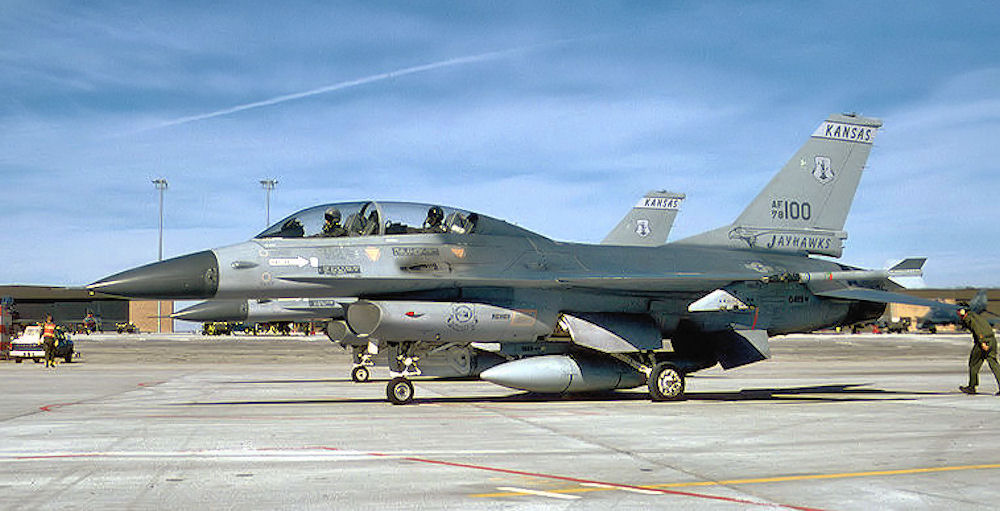
F-16B 78-0100, about 2000

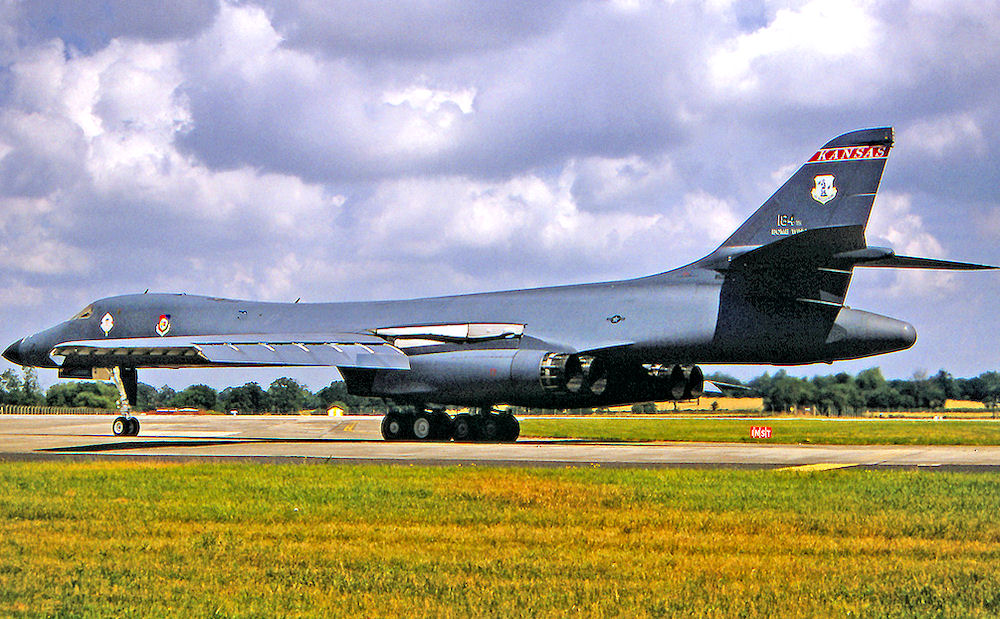
127th Bomb Squadron Rockwell B-1B Lancer 85-0064

In January 1968, following the North Korea seizure of the USS Pueblo (AGER-2), the unit was ordered to extended active duty, and deployed to Kunsan Air Base, South Korea. The unit was assigned to the 354th Tactical Fighter Wing until release from active duty and return to state control in June 1969. On 25 March 1971, the squadron was designated the 127th Tactical Fighter Training Squadron and acquired the F-105 Thunderchief aircraft, receiving Vietnam War returning aircraft. As the USAF Combat Crew Training School, the unit conducted pilot training in the F-105 for nine years.

On 7 August 1979, the unit received its first F-4D Phantom II, and on 8 October 1979, was designated as the 127th Tactical Fighter Squadron. In August 1988, the 127th graduated its final Fighter Weapons Instructor Course Class. The squadron converted as the second F-16 Fighting Falcon training squadron. The last F-4D departed from on 31 March 1990.

==== Post Cold War era ====
In July 1993, the squadron changed gaining commands and became part of the new Air Education and Training Command. In July 1994, the squadron was designated at the 127th Bomb Squadron and again became part of the Air Combat Command, flying the Rockwell B-1B Lancer. The 184th Wing was the first Air National Guard unit to fly bombers. It received its B-1Bs from the former 28th Bomb Squadron at McConnell.

In order to save money, the USAF agreed to reduce its active fleet of B-1Bs from 92 to 60 aircraft. The first B-1B was flown to storage at AMARC on 20 August 2002. In total, 24 B-1Bs were consigned to storage at AMARC, with ten of these being retained in "active storage" which means that they could be quickly returned to service should circumstances dictate. The remaining 14 in storage at AMARC were scavenged for spare parts to keep the remainder flying. The remaining 8 aircraft to be withdrawn from service were placed on static display at various museums. In exchange for retiring its B-1s, the 127th was redesigned the 127th Air Refueling Squadron on 16 September 2002, flying the Boeing KC-135R tanker.

==== BRAC 2005 ====
In its 2005 BRAC Recommendations, DoD recommended realigning McConnell by relocating the squadron's nine KC-135R aircraft to the 190th Air Refueling Wing at Forbes Air National Guard Base, which would retire its KC-135E aircraft. The 184th Wing's operations and maintenance manpower would transfer with the aircraft to Forbes. Realigning ANG KC-135R aircraft from McConnell to Forbes would replace the 190th's aging, higher maintenance KC-135E aircraft with newer models while retaining the experienced personnel from one of the highest-ranking reserve component tanker bases.

In June 2007, the 190th gained all KC-135R aircraft from the 184th. This action consolidated all of the Kansas ANG's KC-135R assets into a single wing located at Forbes. In April 2008, the 127th Squadron was designated the 184th Intelligence Squadron With the loss of the flying mission the "Flying Jayhawks" are now the "Fighting Jayhawks". The squadron was inactivated in 2014.

== Lineage ==
- Designated as the 127th Observation Squadron and allotted to the National Guard on 30 July 1940

Activated on 4 August 1941
Ordered to active service on 6 October 1941
Redesignated 127th Observation Squadron (Light) on 13 January 1942
Redesignated 127th Observation Squadron on 4 July 1942
Redesignated 127th Liaison Squadron on 2 April 1943
Redesignated 127th Liaison Squadron (Commando) on 1 May 1944
Inactivated on 15 November 1945
Redesignated 127th Fighter Squadron and allotted to the National Guard on 24 May 1946
Activated on 27 August 1946
Extended federal recognition on 7 September 1946
Ordered to active service on 10 October 1950
Redesignated 127th Fighter-Bomber Squadron on 18 October 1950
Inactivated, relieved from active duty and returned to state control on 10 July 1952
Redesignated 127th Fighter-Interceptor Squadron on 1 June 1954
Redesignated 127th Tactical Fighter Squadron (Special Delivery) on 1 April 1961
Redesignated 127th Tactical Fighter Squadron c. 15 October 1962
Ordered to active service on 26 January 1968
Relieved from active duty and returned to state control on 18 June 1969
Redesignated 127th Tactical Fighter Training Squadron on 25 March 1971
Redesignated 127th Tactical Fighter Squadron on 8 October 1979
Redesignated 127th Fighter Squadron on 16 March 1992
Redesignated 127th Bomb Squadron on 1 July 1994
Redesignated 127th Air Refueling Squadron on 16 September 2002
Redesignated 127th Command and Control Squadron on 1 April 2008
Inactivated c. 29 September 2014

=== Assignments ===
- Kansas National Guard, 4 August 1941
- 68th Observation Group, 6 October 1941
- 75th Observation Group (later 75th Reconnaissance Group), 12 March 1942
- I Air Support Command (later I Tactical Air Division; III Tactical Air Division), 11 August 1943
- 2d Air Commando Group, 1 May 1944
- United States Army Forces, Pacific, 4 August 1945
- Thirteenth Air Force, 15 September 1945
- Seventh Air Force, 29 October – 15 November 1945
- 131st Fighter Group, 7 September 1946
- 137th Fighter-Bomber Group, 10 October 1950
- 131st Fighter-Bomber Group (later 131st Fighter-Interceptor Group, 131st Fighter Group (Air Defense), 131st Tactical Fighter Group), 10 July 1952
- 184th Tactical Fighter Group, 1 October 1962
- 354th Tactical Fighter Wing, 26 January 1968
- 184th Tactical Fighter Group (later 184th Tactical Fighter Training Group, 184th Tactical Fighter Group, 184th Fighter Group, 184th Bomb Group), 18 June 1969
- 184th Operations Group, 1 October 1995
- 184th Regional Support Group, 1 July 2007 – 29 September 2014

=== Stations ===
- Wichita Municipal Airport, Kansas, 4 August 1941;
- Sherman Field, Kansas, 13 October 1941
- William Northern Field, Tennessee, 13 April 1942
- Morris Field, North Carolina, 2 September 1943
- Statesboro Army Air Field, Georgia, 13 October 1943
- Aiken Army Air Field, South Carolina, 18 May 1944
- Dunnellon Army Air Field, Florida, 10 June 1944
- Cross City Army Air Field, Florida, 21 June 1944
- Drew Field, Florida, 17 August 1944
- Lakeland Army Air Field, Florida, 22 Aug-23 Oct 1944
- Kalaikunda Airfield, India, 16 December 1944 – 4 August 1945

"B" Flight operated from Cox's Bazar Airfield, Burma, 20 Jan-c. 7 February 1945; Akyab Airfield, Burma, 21 Feb-19 May 1945)

- Yontan Airfield, Okinawa, 15 Sep-15 Nov 1945
- Wichita Army Air Field, 7 September 1946
- Wichita Municipal Airport, 15 November 1946
- Alexandria Air Force Base, Louisiana, 27 November 1950 – 4 May 1952
- Chaumont-Semoutiers Air Base, France, 13 May 1952 – 10 July 1952
- Wichita Air Force Base (later McConnell Air Force Base), 10 July 1952
- Kunsan Air Base, South Korea, 26 January 1968 – 18 June 1969
- McConnell Air Force Base, 18 June 1969 – 29 September 2014

=== Aircraft ===
- Douglas O-38, 1941–1942
- Douglas O-46, 1941–1942
- O-49A Vigilant, 1941–1942
- North American O-47, 1943–1944
- A-20 Havoc, 1942–1943
- P-40 Warhawk, 1942–1943
- L-6 Grasshopper, 1942–1943
- L-5 Sentinel, 1944–1945
- C-64 Norseman, 1944–1945
- L-4 Grasshopper, 1945
- L-1 Vigilant, 1945
- P-51D (later F-51D) Mustang, 1946–1949; 1952–1954
- F-84C Thunderjet, 1949–1950
- F-84G Thunderjet, 1950–1952
- F-80C Shooting Star, 1954–1958
- F-86D Sabre Interceptor, 1958–1961
- F-100C Super Sabre, 1961–1971
- F-105 Thunderchief, 1971–1979
- F-4D Phantom II, 1979–1987
- F-16A/B Fighting Falcon, 1987–1990
- F-16C/D Fighting Falcon, 1990–1994
- Rockwell B-1B Lancer, 1994–2002
- KC-135R Stratotanker, 2002–2007

== See also ==
- List of observation squadrons of the United States Army National Guard
