= Kansas Air National Guard =

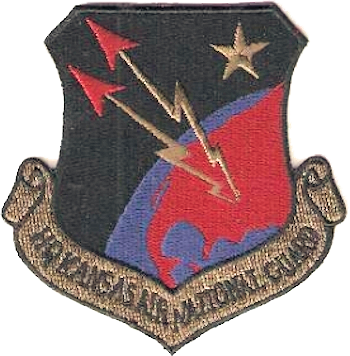
- Shield of the Kansas Air National Guard
- Active: 17 January 1947 - present
- Country: United States
- Allegiance: Kansas
- Branch: Air National Guard
- Type: State militia, military reserve force
- Role: "To meet state and federal mission responsibilities."
- Part of: Kansas National Guard; United States National Guard Bureau
- Garrison/HQ: Nickell Memorial Armory, 2722 SW Topeka Blvd Topeka, Kansas, 66611

Commanders
- Civilian leadership: President Donald Trump (Commander-in-Chief); Troy Meink (Secretary of the Air Force); Governor Laura Kelly (Governor of the State of Kansas)
- State military leadership: Major General David Weishaar

Aircraft flown
- Tanker: KC-135R Stratotanker

The Kansas Air National Guard (KS ANG) is the aerial militia of the State of Kansas, United States of America. It is a reserve of the United States Air Force and along with the Kansas Army National Guard, an element of the Kansas National Guard.

As state militia units, the units in the Kansas Air National Guard are not in the normal United States Air Force chain of command. They are under the jurisdiction of the governor of Kansas through the office of the Adjutant General of Kansas unless they are federalized by order of the president of the United States. The Kansas Air National Guard is headquartered in Topeka, and its commander is currently Brigadier General Bradley S. Link.

== Overview ==
Under the "Total Force" concept, Kansas Air National Guard units are considered to be Air Reserve Components (ARC) of the United States Air Force (USAF). Kansas ANG units are trained and equipped by the Air Force and are operationally gained by a major command of the USAF if federalized. In addition, the Kansas Air National Guard forces are assigned to Air Expeditionary Forces and are subject to deployment tasking orders along with their active duty and Air Force Reserve counterparts in their assigned cycle deployment window.

Along with their federal reserve obligations, as state militia units the elements of the Kansas ANG are subject to being activated by order of the governor to provide protection of life and property, and preserve peace, order and public safety. State missions include disaster relief in times of earthquakes, hurricanes, floods and forest fires, search and rescue, protection of vital public services, and support to civil defense.

== Components ==
The Kansas Air National Guard consists of the following major units:

- 190th Air Refueling Wing

Established 23 February 1957 (as: 117th Fighter-Interceptor Squadron); operates: KC-135R Stratotanker
Stationed at: Forbes Field Air National Guard Base, Topeka
Gained by: Air Mobility Command
The 190th ARW provides worldwide air refueling support to major commands of the United States Air Force, as well as other U.S. military forces and the military forces of allied nations flying the KC-135 Stratotanker.

- 184th Intelligence Wing

Established 4 Aug 1941 (as: 127th Observation Squadron)
Stationed at: McConnell Air Force Base, Wichita
Gained by: Air Force Intelligence, Surveillance and Reconnaissance Agency
The 184th IW provides wartime support in the form of collecting and analyzing intelligence. Some unit members deploy overseas to augment active duty forces.

== History ==
The Militia Act of 1903 established the present National Guard system, units raised by the states but paid for by the Federal Government, liable for immediate state service. If federalized by Presidential order, they fall under the regular military chain of command. On 1 June 1920, the Militia Bureau issued Circular No.1 on organization of National Guard air units.

The Kansas Air National Guard origins date to 4 August 1941 with the establishment of the 127th Observation Squadron. It is oldest unit of the Kansas Air National Guard. It is one of the 29 original National Guard Observation Squadrons of the United States Army National Guard formed before World War II. Initially the squadron had 115 men in its ranks. It was, however, still short of officers since it only had nine officers but was authorized a total of thirty-one. Moved to Sherman Field at Fort Leavenworth, by November 1941 the squadron had one BE-1, one O-47A, one O-38E and several L-1's. All of the aircraft were single engine observation/liaison planes. The 127th Observation Squadron was ordered into active service on 6 October 1941 as part of the buildup of the Army Air Corps.

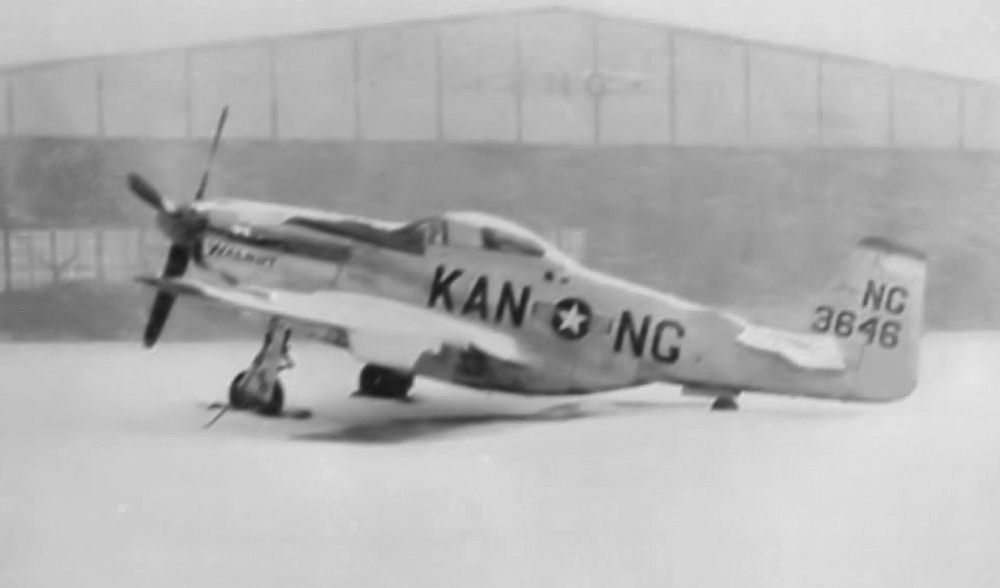
An F-51D of the 127th Fighter Squadron at Wichita Municipal Airport. Note the fuselage designation "NG", indicating the photo was taken prior to the formation of the Air National Guard in September 1947.

In 1946, the United States Army Air Forces, in response to dramatic postwar military budget cuts, imposed by President Harry S. Truman, allocated inactive unit designations to the National Guard Bureau for the formation of an Air Force National Guard. These unit designations were allotted and transferred to various State Air National Guard bureaus to provide them unit designations to re-establish them as Air National Guard units.

The modern Kansas Air National Guard received federal recognition on 7 September 1946 as the 127th Fighter Squadron at Wichita Municipal Airport, Wichita. It was equipped with F-51D Mustangs and its mission was the air defense of the state. 18 September 1947, however, is considered the Kansas Air National Guard's official birth concurrent with the establishment of the United States Air Force as a separate branch of the United States military under the National Security Act On 23 February 1957, the 117th Fighter-Interceptor Squadron, was federally recognized at Hutchinson Air National Guard Base, Hutchinson, equipped with F-80C Shooting Star jet interceptors.

On 1 October 1962 the 127th Tactical Fighter Squadron was authorized to expand to a group level, and the 184th Tactical Fighter Group was allotted by the National Guard Bureau, extended federal recognition and activated. That same year, the 117th Tactical Reconnaissance Squadron was expanded on 15 October and the 190th Tactical Reconnaissance Group was federally recognized.

Today the 184th Intelligence Wing (IW) at McConnell Air Force Base provide wartime support in the form of collecting and analyzing intelligence. The 190th Air Refueling Wing (ARW) at Forbes Field AGB, Topeka, provides global reach for the United States Air Force through the in-flight refueling of fighters, bombers and other aircraft using the KC-135 Stratotankers.

After the September 11th, 2001 terrorist attacks on the United States, elements of every Air National Guard unit in Kansas have been activated in support of the global war on terrorism. Flight crews, aircraft maintenance personnel, communications technicians, air controllers and air security personnel were engaged in Operation Noble Eagle air defense overflights of major United States cities. Also, Kansas ANG units have been deployed overseas as part of Operation Enduring Freedom in Afghanistan and Operation Iraqi Freedom in Iraq as well as other locations as directed.

== See also ==
- Kansas State Guard
- Kansas Wing Civil Air Patrol
