= McConnell Air Force Base =

US Air Force base near Wichita, Kansas, United States

- Wichita, Kansas in the United States of America
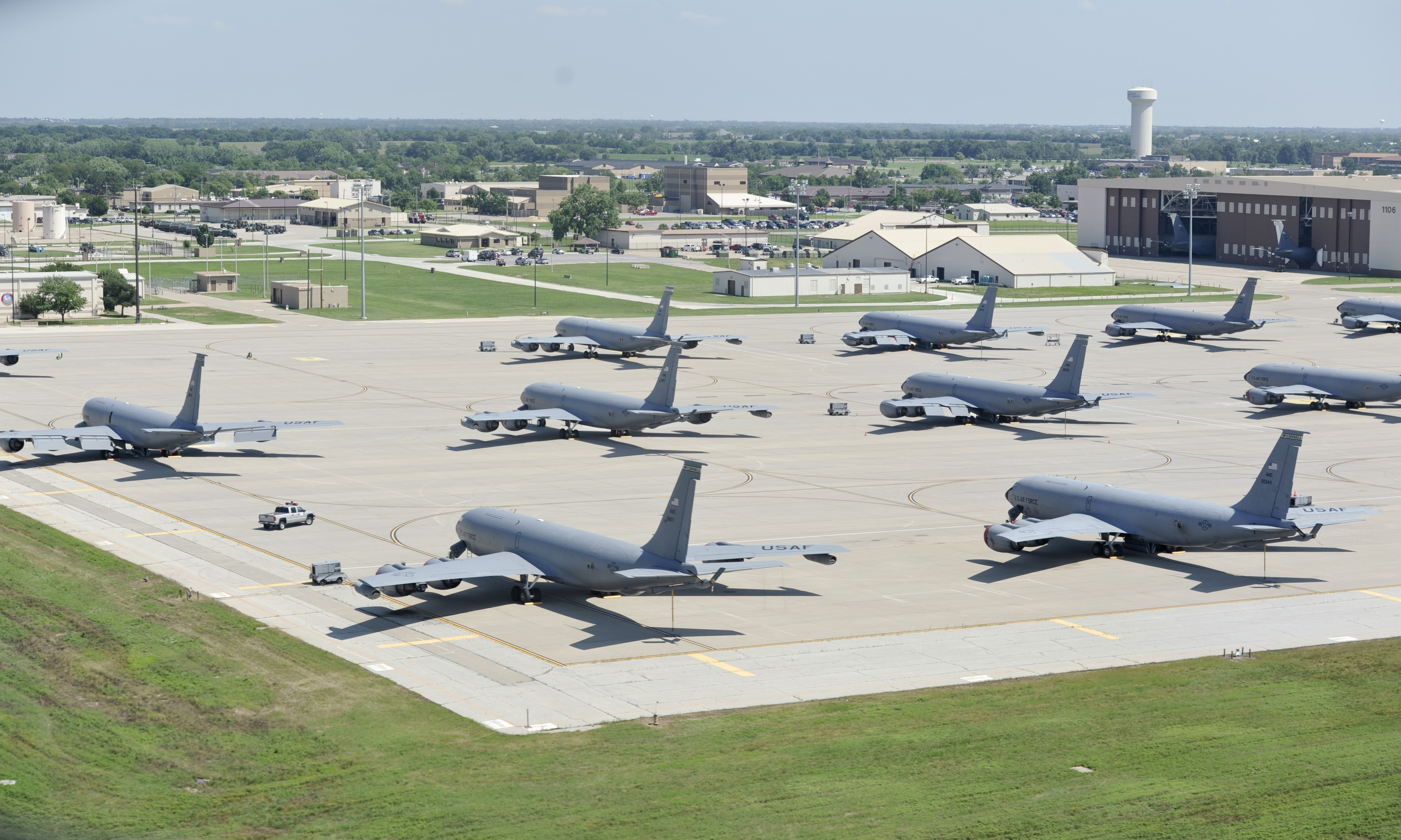
- Several KC-135R Stratotankers on the apron at McConnell AFB during 2013.

Site information
- Type: U.S. Air Force Base
- Owner: Department of Defense
- Operator: U.S. Air Force
- Controlled by: Air Mobility Command (AMC)
- Condition: Operational
- Website: www.mcconnell.af.mil

Location
- Location within Kansas Location within the United States Location within North America
- Coordinates: 37°37′23″N 097°16′02″W

Site history
- Built: 1929 (as Wichita Municipal Airport)
- In use: 1941 – present

Garrison information
- Current commander: Colonel Joseph D. Wall
- Garrison: 22nd Air Refueling Wing (Host)

Airfield information
- Identifiers: IATA: IAB, ICAO: KIAB, FAA LID: IAB, WMO: 724505
- Elevation: 417.8 metres (1,371 ft) AMSL
Runways
Direction	Length and surface
01L/19R	3,657.6 metres (12,000 ft) Concrete
01R/19L	3,659.7 metres (12,007 ft) Asphalt and concrete

McConnell Air Force Base (IATA: IAB, ICAO: KIAB, FAA LID: IAB) is a United States Air Force base located four miles (6 km) southeast of the central business district of Wichita, a city in Sedgwick County, Kansas, United States. The airbase was named in honor of the brothers Fred and Thomas McConnell of Wichita, who had both been Air Force pilots and veterans of World War II. It is the home of Air Mobility Command's 22nd Air Refueling Wing (22 ARW), Air Force Reserve Command's 931st Air Refueling Wing (931 ARW), and the Kansas Air National Guard's 184th Wing (184 W).

McConnell's primary mission is to provide global reach by conducting air refueling and airlift where and when needed.

== History ==
McConnell Air Force Base was known during the first part of its existence as the Wichita Municipal Airport. Although the field was designed originally to serve only municipal civil airport needs, it had an Air Force connection almost from the beginning.

=== Origins ===
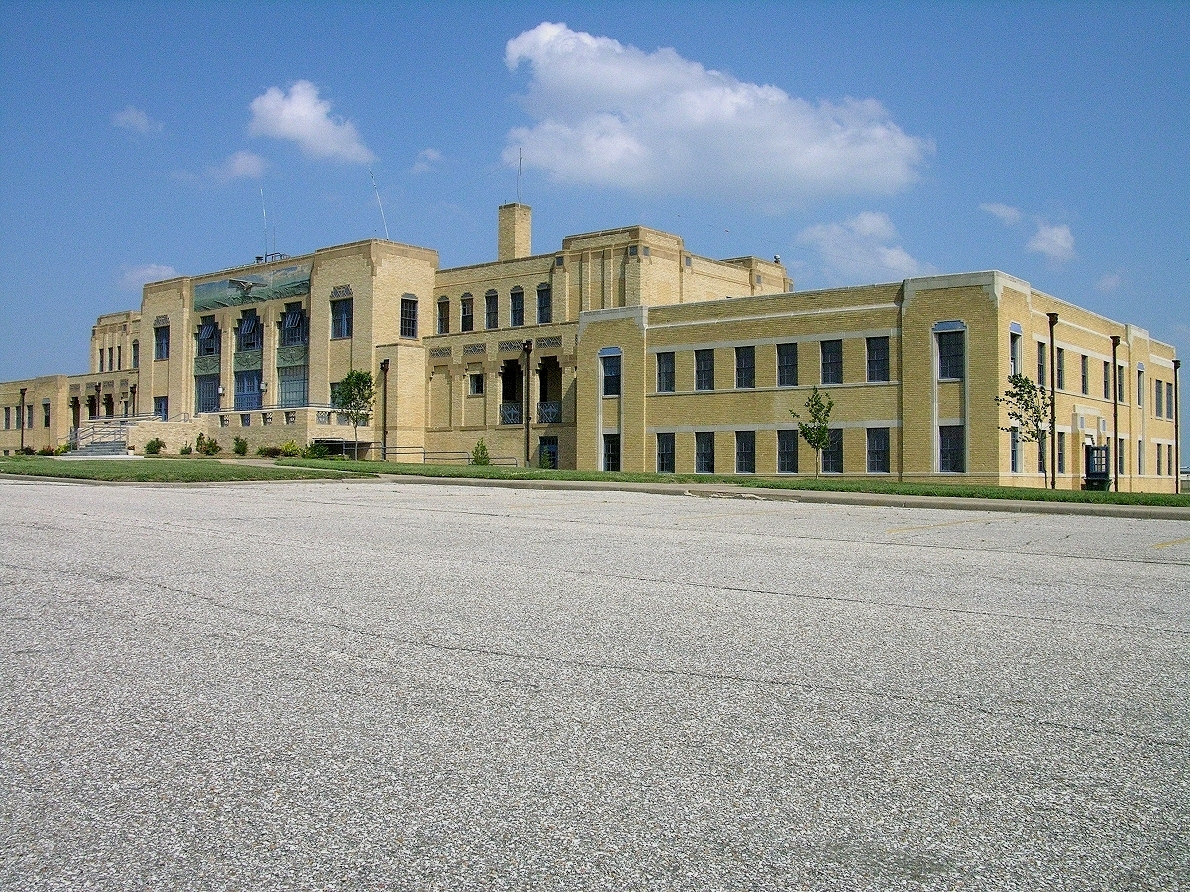
Kansas Aviation Museum, formerly Wichita Municipal Airport from 1935 to 1951

McConnell's history began in October 1924, when the city of Wichita hosted more than 100,000 people for the National Air Congress. The event was used by city planners to raise funds for a proposed Wichita Municipal Airport. The event was a success and ground-breaking ceremonies for the airport were held on 28 June 1929.

In August 1941, the Kansas National Guard 127th Observation Squadron was activated as the first military unit assigned to the Wichita airport. The unit's limited equipment included one BC-1A, one C-47, and four L-1 aircraft. This was the start of a cooperative relationship between the people of Wichita and military aviation.

=== B-29 Superfortress production ===
On 6 October 1941, the unit was ordered to extended active duty and remained an integral part of the United States Army Air Corps until 6 October 1945, with duty assignments in Tennessee and Okinawa. The airport, at that time, was located several miles southeast of downtown Wichita and comprised some 1,337 acres. The runways were adequate; five runways were each 150 feet (46 m) wide; two were 7,500 feet (2,300 m), one 7,100 feet (2,200 m), one 6,000 feet (1,800 m), and one 4,500 feet (1,400 m) in length. All had a wheel load capacity of 60,000 pounds (27,000 kg). A parking apron with dimensions of 8,373 by 931 feet (2,552 by 284 m), and seven taxi strips were provided.

Other facilities at the airport, however, were meager. The field could boast of only one hangar and three small warehouses. No facilities were available either for troop housing or troop messing. No fuel storage facilities existed, and all such supplies were handled by commercial contract.

A lease between the federal government and the city was concluded and on 1 March 1942, the AAF Materiel Center, Midwestern Procurement District (Air Materiel Command) was established at Wichita Army Airfield. As soon as construction permitted, the headquarters of the district was established in the administration building of the municipal airport. By the end of 1942, due to the growth and expansion of the organization it occupied practically the entire building save for a few offices occupied by the CAA and airline companies, while some activities of the district were housed at the Boeing Airplane Company Plant No. 1, in Wichita.

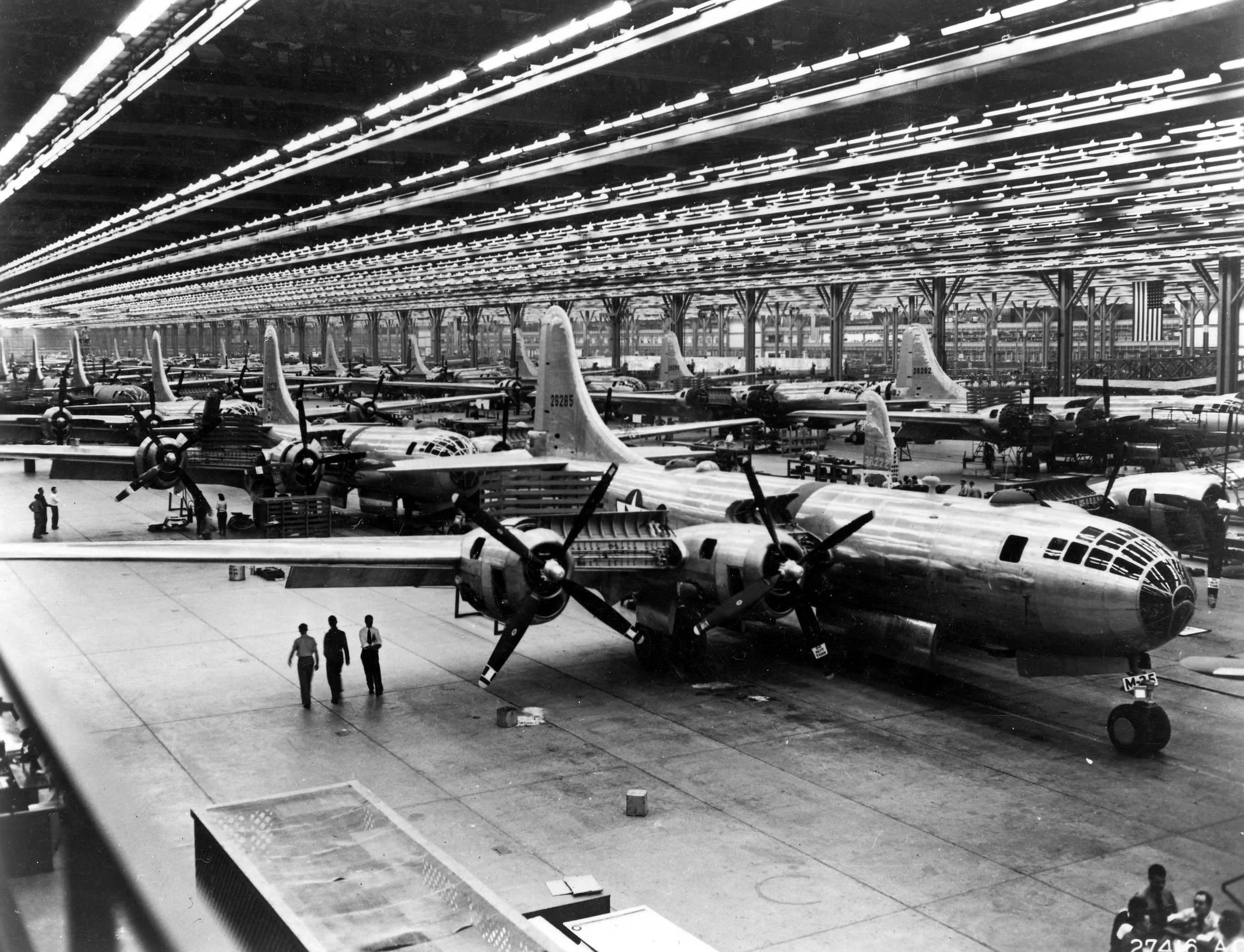
Boeing-Wichita B-29 Assembly Line – 1944

Air Materiel Command's mission at the airport was to accept, service and coordinate the transfer of newly produced Boeing B-29 Superfortress bombers to other installations. In addition, Ferrying Division, Air Transport Command's 4156th AAF Base Unit (Air Base) was organized. The new base unit had the mission of servicing, dispatching, and maintaining transient and locally based aircraft. The working personnel were entirely civilian, with a few officers in supervisory capacities.

On 11 October 1946, the 4156th AAF Base Unit was ordered to cease operations by the 30th of the month. Consequently, the remainder of October was spent in closing down operations and transferring property to Tinker Army Airfield, Oklahoma.

On 15 November the field was officially transferred to the District Engineer, Seventh Service Command at Omaha, Nebraska who assumed jurisdiction over the field, pending disposition, while the 4156th AAF Base Unit was discontinued on the same day. All military personnel were absorbed by Headquarters, Oklahoma City Air Materiel Area (the successor of the Oklahoma City Air Technical Service Command).

Wichita Airport was returned to civilian jurisdiction, and it remained so until 1951.

=== Cold War ===
The Boeing B-47 Stratojet was the first swept-winged jet bomber built in quantity for any air force, and was the mainstay of the medium-bombing strength of the Strategic Air Command all throughout the 1950s. The Boeing plant at Wichita was shut down after World War II. However, on 3 September 1948, the first production order was placed for the B-47. Since Boeing's Seattle facility was already heavily committed to the KC-97 Stratofreighter tanker and the B-50 Superfortress bomber, as well as to the conversion of obsolescent B-29 bombers to aerial tankers, it was decided that the production Stratojets were to be built at Boeing's factory in Wichita.

==== B-47 Stratojet training ====
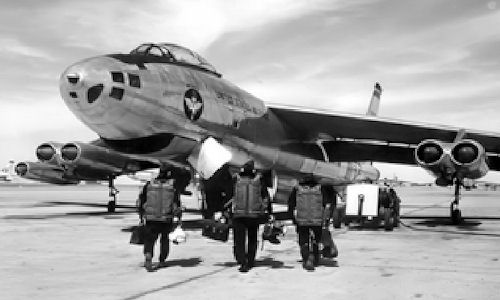
B-47A pilots training at Wichita's McConnell AFB in 1955. The planes were built across the runway at Boeing.

By the summer of 1950, Boeing was ready to turn out the first production models of the B-47, and the United States Air Force sought to make Wichita Airport a permanent military installation. Public hearings began to consider locating an Air Force base near the Wichita Boeing facilities, and the city of Wichita was awarded $9.4 million to build a new airfield for its own use, later to become known as Wichita Dwight D. Eisenhower National Airport. In addition, the production of the B-47 Stratojet bomber at Boeing made the airport a desirable location for the Air Force to conduct B-47 combat crew training.

On 31 May 1951, the USAF took title to Wichita Municipal Airport, and on 4 June the Air Training Command 3520th Combat Crew Training Wing was activated at the facility. To perform the training, the 3520th Combat Crew Training Wing was activated, and an ambitious building program totaling some $22,000,000 was begun.

In spite of the difficulty of building an installation and initiating an entirely new program simultaneously, the base developed into a highly specialized training center. There were two principal parts to the mission of the training center: aircrew training in B-47's and transition training in the same aircraft. A subsequent fluctuation of emphasis from one of those functions to the other reflected the varying demands of the Strategic Air Command. A more inclusive functional title was given the wing in June 1952 when it was redesignated the 3520th Flying Training Wing (M Bomb).

The Air Force was not the sole occupant during this period. In 1952 Wing Headquarters shared the Wichita Municipal Airport Terminal Building with four commercial airlines, Braniff Airlines, Central Airlines, Trans World Airlines, and Continental Airlines, and also one private flying service: "Executive Airways". These air lines were located in the terminal building at the time of government occupation, and they were permitted to operate on a temporary basis pending completion of the new municipal airport for Wichita.

Up through 1 April 1952, the Wichita Municipal Airport was under the jurisdiction of the Flying Training Air Force. On that date it was transferred to the Crew Training Air Force, another division of the Air Training Command.

By 1952, the Air Force had decided to make a permanent airbase of the municipal airport. The Federal Government took over the property by federal court action during the first half of 1952, thus becoming the owner and no longer a lessee. Reflecting official government ownership, Wichita Municipal Airport was redesignated as the Wichita Air Force Base on 15 May 1953.

However, the name was changed to McConnell Air Force Base after less than a year in honor of Wichita brothers Fred and Thomas McConnell, both Air Force pilots and World War II veterans. Fred was killed in a private plane crash in 1945, while Thomas died in a bombing raid on Bougainville Island in the South Pacific.

Air Training Command was host at the base from 1951 through 1958, training B-47 aircrews. Strategic Air Command took control over the base on 1 July 1958 and the B-47 training mission. The 4347th Combat Crew Training Wing replaced the 3520th and the 42d Strategic Aerospace Division was activated on 15 July 1959. B-47 crew training continued at McConnell until 1 March 1963 when the 4347th CCTW was inactivated.

==== Titan II ballistic missiles ====
On 1 March 1962, Strategic Air Command stood up the 381st Strategic Missile Wing (SMW). Using McConnell as their base, 18 Titan II ICBM missile silos formed a ring from the northeast around to the south and the west on an irregular radius of 20 to 50 miles from the base. This mission of deterrence dominated base activity for the next twenty-four years until 1986 when the 381st Strategic Missile Wing was inactivated. The removal of the missiles and of all Titan II ICBM systems began in July 1982 and was completed in June 1987. All of the missile silos in Kansas and Arkansas were demolished, and all but one of them in Arizona.

==== Tactical fighter aircraft ====
In October 1962, the 388th Tactical Fighter Wing was reactivated at McConnell with four (560th, 561st, 562d, 563d) fighter squadrons. The wing initially flew the North American F-100C Super Sabre, but was replaced in 1963 by the Republic F-105D/F Thunderchief. On 4 July 1963, Tactical Air Command became responsible for the base with the 388 TFW as host unit.

On 21 July 1964, the 355th Tactical Fighter Wing was also reactivated at McConnell with four F-105 (354th, 357th, 421st, 469th) squadrons. Both wings would deploy to Thailand in support of the Vietnam War. On 8 November 1965, the 355th was ordered to Takhli Royal Thai Air Force Base and on 8 April 1966 the 388th TFW was ordered to Korat RTAFB, where its F-105 squadrons had been on a rotational deployment for the past two years.

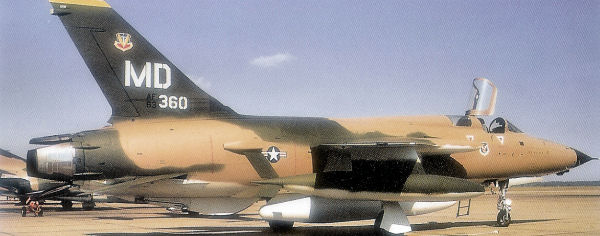
F-105F-1-RE Thunderchief AF Serial No. 63-8360 of the 561st Tactical Fighter squadron, McConnell AFB, Kansas – 1970. This aircraft was later converted to the F-105G "Wild Weasel" configuration. It was hit by flak over North Vietnam on 17 September 1972 and crashed at sea.

On 8 February 1964 the 23d Tactical Fighter Wing was reactivated at McConnell initially with three F-105 (561st, 562d, 563d) squadrons. The 4519th Combat Crew Training Squadron was activated on 1 August 1967 with F-105B/D/F/G aircraft, then was inactivated on 16 October 1969, being replaced by the 419th TFS.

Squadron markings on the natural metal / silver lacquered aircraft included the following: 561 TFS – black/yellow checkerboarding on rudder; 562 TFS – a red, white and black "sharkmouth" on the nose of the aircraft; 563 TFS red and white stripes on the rudder, wingtips and stabilizers with a white band on the top of the vertical fin. When the finish on tactical jets was replaced by Southeast Asian Camouflaged, the squadrons carried the following tail codes: 561 TFS "MD"; 562 TFS "ME"; 563 TFS "MF", and the 4519th, (later 419th TFS).TFTS "MG".

The mission of the 23 TFW at McConnell was to provide training for F-105 pilots prior to their deployment to Southeast Asia. The 560th acted as a combat training squadron, while the other three squadrons began rotational TDY deployments to Southeast Asia beginning in November 1964.

In February 1965, when the 23 TFW deployed three squadrons to Southeast Asia for combat, these units were initially under the control of the 2d Air Division. Later, the 6441 TFW (P) was activated at Takhli RTAFB in July 1965, taking control of the 23d's squadrons deployed there. In addition to the deployments to Thailand, detachments of the 561 TFS also deployed to Da Nang Air Base RVN for operations within the borders of the Republic of Vietnam.

On 1 August 1967, the 4519th Combat Crew Training squadron was added to the 23 TFW, and the 560 TFS was inactivated on 25 September 1968.

The wing maintained proficiency in tactical fighter operations, and later also functioned as an F-105 replacement training unit and assisted Air National Guard units in their conversion to the F-105 when the Thunderchief left first-line service. For the dual role it played from June 1970 to June 1971 as both an operational and a training unit, the wing received the Air Force Outstanding Unit Award. In 1970, the "Wild Weasel" F-105G model replaced the F-105D/F models in the 561st and 419th TFSs.

On 1 July 1972, the 23d TFW was transferred to England AFB, Louisiana where it replaced the temporary 4403d TFW, and the 561, 562 and 563 TFS were assigned to the 35 TFW at George AFB, California.

The administrative organization in command of these wings was the 835th Air Division, activated on 24 June 1964. This AD was inactivated 30 June 1971, leaving the 23d TFW as the main air unit at McConnell until its departure a year later.

==== Strategic bomber/air refueling ====
McConnell received a new mission in April 1971 with the arrival of the 91st Air Refueling Squadron (ARS) and their Boeing KC-135A Stratotankers from Robins AFB, Georgia. Control of the base was transferred back to SAC on 1 July 1972, and the 384th Air Refueling Wing (ARW) began its tour at McConnell AFB in December 1972 and took control of the 91st ARS. On 30 September 1973, a second KC-135A refueling squadron, the 384th ARS was activated on the base, making McConnell an air refueling hub for SAC.

In early 1983, the 384 ARW's leadership learned that it would be the first wing to receive the upgraded KC-135R. The 91st and 384th ARW were both upgraded to the new model in 1984. The "R" model had upgraded engines which produced much greater fuel efficiency than the older models, as well as having a higher on-board fuel storage capacity. The initial aircraft marking for both squadrons was a light blue/navy blue diamond checkerboard fin flash.

On 2 October 1981, President Ronald Reagan announced a Strategic Modernization Program (SMP), a key feature of which would be the procurement of 100 North American-Rockwell B-1B bombers. The first production models entered the USAF inventory in March 1985. It was announced by the Air Force that McConnell would be equipped with the B-1B in 1987. The 384th was redesignated as the 384th Bombardment Wing, Heavy on 1 July 1987, and the 28th Bombardment Squadron was activated that date to fly the 25 bombers assigned to the wing.

With the arrival of the B-1s, the 91st ARS was inactivated, leaving the wing with one KC-135 tanker squadron. The 91st was later reactivated in July 1988 with the new 301st ARW at Malmstrom AFB, Montana with KC-135R aircraft.

In January 1987, the Kansas Air National Guard 184th Tactical Fighter Training Group upgraded from its McDonnell-Douglas F-4D fighters to the General Dynamics F-16A/B Fighting Falcon and conducted conversion and upgrade training in the F-16. On 8 July 1987, the 161st Tactical Fighter Training Squadron was established as the third flying squadron at McConnell. Formal activation ceremonies for the 161st occurred on 12 September 1987, with the unit flying 10 F-16s and conducting its first student training class.

In August 1990, Iraq invaded neighboring Kuwait and McConnell personnel and aircraft were deployed throughout the Middle East, performing refueling missions of Coalition aircraft in support of Operation Desert Shield/Desert Storm to help eject the invaders from the small kingdom of Kuwait.

=== 1991 tornado ===
On 26 April 1991, an F5 tornado devastated McConnell during the Andover, Kansas Tornado Outbreak. As a result of the tornado, the base constructed new facilities to replace the destroyed base services. Moving in a northeast direction, the tornado crossed the southern end of the runways, missing a line of B-1B bombers, two of which were carrying nuclear ordnance, and maintenance hangars. One of the new facilities included a combined Officers Club/Enlisted Club/Fitness Center which was coincidentally christened "Emerald City", after the destination of Dorothy after her house was deposited in Oz by a tornado in The Wizard of Oz, before being renamed the "Robert J. Dole Community Center" on 29 October 2004.

=== Post Cold War ===
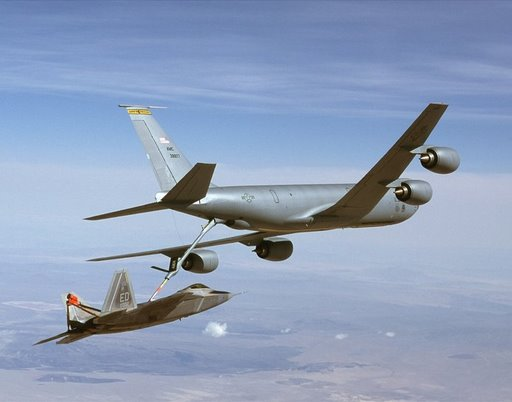
A KC-135R Stratotanker from the 22nd Air Refueling Wing refuels an F-22A Raptor from Edwards AFB, California.

With the end of the Cold War, the Air Force went through many changes. One of these changes was the Objective Wing concept, which created "Operations Groups" (OG) to place operational aircraft squadrons under organizationally. The 38th engaged this change on 1 September 1991 and was redesignated simply as the 384th Wing, with the 28th Bomb Squadron (B-1B) and the 384th Air Refueling Squadron (KC-135R) as its operational units.

In 1992, additional changes were made at McConnell. In March, the 184th Tactical Fighter Group was designated as the 184th Fighter Group. On 1 June Strategic Air Command was inactivated as part of a massive re-alignment of the Air Force command structure. The 384th was assigned to the newly established Air Combat Command (ACC), a new command which replaced SAC, TAC and elements of Military Airlift Command (MAC). The wing was again redesignated as the 384th Bomb Wing, and the 28th BS aircraft were assigned the tail code "OZ". The 384th ARS was relieved from assignment to McConnell, and was reassigned to the 19th OG (19th Air Refueling Wing) at Robins AFB, Georgia. The 184th FG also became part of ACC.

In July 1993, the 184th Fighter Group changed gaining commands and became part of the new Air Education and Training Command, due to its F-16 training commitment, however just one year later the 184th rejoined ACC when the F-16s were transferred out. The unit was redesignated as the 184th Bomb Wing and the redesignated 127th Bomb Squadron received the first of fourteen B-1B bombers. The unit became operational in the summer of 1994. The 184th was the first Air National Guard unit to fly the B-1 Lancer.

As a result of a Base Realignment and Closure (BRAC) related realignment, March AFB, California was taken off active duty status and assigned to the Air Force Reserve. As part of a program to keep historically significant wings active, its 22d Air Refueling Wing was reassigned to McConnell without personnel or equipment on 1 January 1994. As a result, on 1 January, the 384th was redesignated as the 384th Bomb Group, as a unit under the 22d ARW.

The USAF planned to return McConnell to being an air refueling hub, and as a result the B-1 equipped 28th Bomb Squadron was reassigned without equipment or personnel to the 7th OG at Dyess AFB, Texas on 1 October 1994. Its B-1 aircraft were transferred across the runway to the Kansas Air National Guard 127th Bomb Squadron and the 384th BG was inactivated on 30 September 1994. Throughout 1994, various KC-135R air refueling squadrons were reassigned from other units to the 22d ARW as follows:

- 344 ARS from 68th ARW, Seymour Johnson AFB, NC (29 April 1994)
- 349 ARS was reactivated at McConnell (1 January 1994)
- 350 ARS from 43d ARW, Beale AFB, CA (1 July 1994)
- 384 ARS from the 19th ARW, Robins AFB, GA (1 January 1994)

On 1 April 1994, the Republic of Singapore Air Force (RSAF) selected McConnell as its training base for its KC-135 crews and maintenance personnel. The RSAF stationed two of their Stratotankers with the 22 ARW, naming the organization the Peace Guardian Detachment

On 1 January 1995, the Air Force Reserve 931st Air Refueling Group (ARG) joined Team McConnell. The Air Force Reserve associate unit provides aircrews while the 22d furnishes the maintenance crews and aircraft.

Since 1996, McConnell served as the test site for the PACER CRAG avionics modernization program. The next year, the base became the test unit for the multi-point refueling.

During the 1990s, the 22d ARW deployed crews and aircraft to support no-fly missions over northern and southern Iraq and over Bosnia-Herzegovina. In 1999, wing aircraft and crews deployed to the Mediterranean to refuel NATO aircraft over Serbia.

==== Global war on terror ====
After the September 11 attacks in 2001, the 22d initially deployed jets in support of Operation Noble Eagle. Before the end of the year, McConnell tankers were sent to Kyrgyzstan, Afghanistan, Southwest Asia and other locations to support Operation Enduring Freedom.

In 2002, in order to save money, the USAF agreed to reduce its active fleet of B-1Bs from 92 to 60 aircraft. All B-1 aircraft built in FY 1983 and most of the FY 1984 B-1 aircraft, which primarily resided in the Kansas Air National Guard and the Georgia Air National Guard, were retired beginning in August 2002, leaving only the more recently built B-1 aircraft in the Regular Air Force still flying. As a result, the 184th Bomb Wing's aircraft were transferred to 309th Aerospace Maintenance and Regeneration Group (AMARG). Initially they were retained in "active storage" which means that they could be quickly returned to service should circumstances dictate. In fact, the older aircraft were scavenged for parts to keep the active-duty aircraft flying.

With the retirement of their B-1s, in September 2002, the 184th took on a new mission flying KC-135s and was officially designated the 184th Air Refueling Wing. This officially established McConnell as the sole base in the U.S. Air Force where all three components, Active Air Force, Air National Guard and Air Force Reserve supported the same mission together in a pure "Mirror Force" concept.

The Base Realignment and Closure Committee in 2005 said that the 184th Air Refueling Wing would become the 184th Intelligence Wing, a non-flying organization, and their KC-135R aircraft transferred to other Regular Air Force air refueling and air mobility wings. They converted to that designation in 2007.

On 23 April 2014, the USAF announced that the Boeing KC-46 Pegasus will be based at McConnell Air Force Base. The base will start receiving the first of 36 tankers in 2016. The Boeing KC-135 Stratotanker is currently stationed at this base. McConnell AFB was chosen because it had low construction costs and it is in a location with a high demand for air refueling. Up to 10 operating bases are to be chosen for the KC-46 fleet. Pegasus crews will be trained at Altus Air Force Base, Oklahoma. Altus AFB was also chosen for its limited construction needs and for other training programs for the C-17 Globemaster and KC-135 already at the base.

=== Major Commands to which assigned ===
- Materiel Command, 1 March 1942 – 17 July 1944
- AAF Materiel and Services, 17 July 1944 – 31 August 1944

Redesignated: AAF Technical Service Comd, 31 August 1944 – 1 July 1945
Redesignated: Air Technical Service Comd, 1 July 1945 – 9 March 1946

- Air Materiel Command, 9 March 1946 – 15 November 1946
- Air Training Command, 7 June 1951 – 1 July 1958
- Strategic Air Command, 1 July 1958 – 1 July 1963
- Tactical Air Command, 1 July 1963 – 1 July 1972
- Strategic Air Command, 1 July 1972 – 1 June 1992
- Air Combat Command, 1 June 1992 – 31 December 1993
- Air Mobility Command, 31 December 1993–present

=== Major units assigned ===
- Midwestern Procurement District Gp, 1 March 1942 – 7 September 1945
- 724th AAF Base Unit, 1 April 1944 – 31 July 1945
- 4156th AAF Base Unit, 7 September 1945 – 15 November 1946
- 3520th Combat Crew Training Wing 5 June 1951 – 15 June 1963
- 4347th Air Base Group, 1 July 1958 – 1 January 1959

Redesignated: 4347th Combat Support Group, 1 January 1959 – 1 March 1962

- 42d Air Division, 15 June 1959 – 1 July 1963
- 381st Strategic Missile Wing, 1 March 1962 – 8 August 1986
- 388th Tactical Fighter Wing, 1 October 1962 – 8 February 1964
- 23d Tactical Fighter Wing, 8 February 1964 – 27 April 1972
- 355th Tactical Fighter Wing, 21 July 1964 – 4 August 1966
- 835th Air Division, 1 July 1964 – 8 June 1969
- 91st Air Refueling Squadron, 7 April 1971 – 30 November 1971
- 384th Air Refueling Wing, 1 December 1971 – 31 December 1993
- 22nd Air Refueling Wing, 1 January 1994–present

References for major commands and major units

== Based units ==
Flying and notable non-flying units based at McConnell Air Force Base.

=== United States Air Force ===
Air Mobility Command (AMC)

- Eighteenth Air Force
  - 22d Air Refueling Wing (Host wing)
  - 22d Comptroller Squadron
    - 22d Operations Group
      - 22d Operations Support Squadron
      - 344th Air Refueling Squadron – Boeing KC-46 Pegasus
      - 349th Air Refueling Squadron – KC-135R Stratotanker
      - 350th Air Refueling Squadron – KC-135R Stratotanker
    - 22d Maintenance Group
      - 22d Aircraft Maintenance Squadron
      - 22d Maintenance Squadron
      - 722d Aircraft Maintenance Squadron
    - 22d Medical Group
    - 22d Mission Support Group
      - 22d Civil Engineer Squadron
      - 22d Communications Squadron
      - 22d Contracting Squadron
      - 22d Force Support Squadron
      - 22d Logistics Readiness Squadron
      - 22d Security Forces Squadron

Air Force Reserve Command (AFRC)

- Fourth Air Force
  - 931st Air Refueling Wing
    - 931st Operations Group
      - 18th Air Refueling Squadron –Boeing KC-46 Pegasus
      - 924th Air Refueling Squadron –Boeing KC-46 Pegasus
      - 905th Air Refueling Squadron -Boeing KC-46 Pegasus
      - 931st Aerospace Medicine Squadron
      - 931st Civil Engineer Squadron
      - 931st Force Support Squadron
      - 931st Security Forces Squadron
    - 931st Maintenance Group
      - 931st Aircraft Maintenance Squadron
      - 931st Maintenance Operations Flight

Air National Guard (ANG)

- Kansas Air National Guard
  - 184th Wing
    - 184th Cyberspace Operations Group
      - 127th Cyberspace Operations Squadron
      - 177th Information Aggressor Squadron
      - 299th Network Operations Security Squadron
    - 184th Intelligence, Surveillance and Reconnaissance Group
      - 161st Intelligence Squadron
      - 184th Intelligence Support Squadron
      - 184th Operations Support Squadron
    - 184th Medical Group
    - 184th Mission Support Group
      - 184th Civil Engineer Squadron
      - 184th Communications Flight
      - 184th Force Support Squadron
      - 184th Logistics Readiness Squadron
      - 184th Security Forces Squadron
    - 184th Regional Support Group
      - 134th Air Control Squadron
      - DET1 Smoky Hill Weapons Range
      - 284th Air Support Operations Squadron

== Education ==
The school district for on-post families is Derby USD 260. Wineteer Elementary School is adjacent to the base, and the zoned secondary schools are Derby Middle School and Derby High School.

== Accidents and incidents ==
- On 28 March 1956, a B-47 exploded near Wichita, Kansas, with an instructor and two student pilots on board. It crashed four miles northeast of the city, killing its crew of three. The office of information services at McConnell Air Force Base said the explosion occurred after takeoff, probably at about 2,000 feet altitude. Wreckage was strewn along the countryside for several miles as the wings sheared off and the fuselage tumbled to earth.
- On 16 January 1965, USAF KC-135A 57-1442, crashed after an engine failure shortly after takeoff from McConnell Air Force Base in north Wichita, Kansas. The fuel-laden plane crashed at a residential street intersection and caused a considerable fire. A total of 30 were killed, including 23 on the ground and the seven member crew.
- 13 January 1992, an F-16 84-1267 of the 184th TFG out of McConnell Air Force Base, Kansas Air National Guard was returning from a practice firing sortie of a M61A1 20mm cannon. Major David Ternes of the 127th Fighter Squadron was bringing the aircraft into McConnell AFB when he experienced trouble at 11:06 hours. Ternes was forced to eject at 150 feet and two miles from base and the aircraft hit the side of a house and exploded. Both the pilot and the home's occupant survived uninjured. The cause was determined to be a lack of engine response.
- On 20 November 2013 at approximately 9:30 pm CST, a Boeing 747-400 Dreamlifter with registration N780BA and operated by Atlas Air, mistakenly landed at the Colonel James Jabara Airport. The large cargo plane was supposed to land at McConnell Air Force Base, taxi over to nearby Spirit AeroSystems, and pick up some fuselage parts for the assembly of Boeing 787 Dreamliners in Seattle, Washington. The plane successfully took off from Jabara Airport at 1:15 pm CST on 21 November and landed shortly thereafter at McConnell AFB. The NTSB opened an investigation about the wrong landing.

== See also ==
- Kansas World War II Army Airfields
- April 26, 1991 tornado outbreak
- Wichita, Kansas

Other airports in Wichita

- Wichita Dwight D. Eisenhower National Airport
- Colonel James Jabara Airport
- List of airports in Kansas

== Notes ==
- Maurer, Maurer. Air Force Combat Units of World War II. Washington, DC: U.S. Government Printing Office 1961 (republished 1983, Office of Air Force History, ISBN 0-912799-02-1).
- Ravenstein, Charles A. Air Force Combat Wings Lineage and Honors Histories 1947–1977. Maxwell Air Force Base, Alabama: Office of Air Force History 1984. ISBN 0-912799-12-9.
- Mueller, Robert, Air Force Bases Volume I, Active Air Force Bases Within the United States of America on 17 September 1982, Office of Air Force History, 1989
- Larsen, Steve A. (2006), Heritage and Legacy: A Brief History of the 22d Air Refueling Wing and McConnell Air Force Base. Office of History, 22d ARS, McConnel AFB, Kansas.
- Martin, Patrick (1994). Tail Code: The Complete History of USAF Tactical Aircraft Tail Code Markings. Schiffer Military Aviation History. ISBN 0-88740-513-4.
- Rogers, Brian (2005). United States Air Force Unit Designations Since 1978. Hinkley, England: Midland Publications. ISBN 1-85780-197-0.
- Aircraft Serial Numbers – 1908 to present
- Heritage and Legacy: A Brief History of the 22d Air Refueling Wing and McConnell Air Force Base
