= Nickell Memorial Armory =

Kansas National Guard armory

Coordinates: 39°01′16″N 95°41′05″W

The Nickell Memorial Armory is a Kansas National Guard armory, located at 2722 SW Topeka Blvd., Topeka, Kansas 66611. It is bounded on the north by 27th Street, on the east by Kansas Avenue and on the west by Topeka Avenue (US 75 highway). On the south is a public baseball complex and an area with retail shops that fronts 29th Street. The armory is more than 0.5 miles (0.80 km) east to west and is almost as wide north to south.

The armory is named for Lieutenant General Joe Nickell, the Adjutant General of Kansas from April 21, 1950, to December 31, 1972. At present, the armory has a staff of between 20 and 49 persons. It contains the Adjutant General's Public Affairs Office and is known as the Kansas State Defense Complex. The armory has approximately fifteen larger buildings and a number of small buildings. A large gymnasium fronts Topeka Avenue.

The armory contains much military equipment and supplies used by Kansas National Guard units. Since Nickell Memorial Armory is a military installation, access points to it are controlled. The armory is surrounded by a tall fence. The only public entrance is on its southeast corner, on Kansas Avenue, where the headquarters building of the armory is located.
