= Billard (surname) =

Billard is a French surname. Notable people with the surname include:

- Armand Billard, French diver
- Aude Billard (born 1971), Swiss physicist
- Bobbi Billard (born 1975), American professional wrestler, actress and model
- Brian Billard, Australian politician
- Charles-Michel Billard (1800–1832), French physician
- Claude Billard (1550–1618), French writer, poet and playwright
- Émile Billard (1852–1930), French sailor
- Frederick C. Billard (1873–1932), American military officer
- Irène Billard (born 1984), French electronic music producer
- Joël Billard (born 1953), French politician
- John Leander Billard (1842–1924), American businessman
- Juliette Billard (1889–1975), French architect, watercolorist and designer
- Lani Billard (born 1979), Canadian actress, drummer and singer
- Lynne Billard (born 1943), Australian statistician
- Martine Billard (born 1952), French politician
- Pierre Billard (religious writer) (1653–1726), French writer of religious essays
- Pierre Billard (screenwriter) (1921–2012), French screenwriter, actor and director
- Pierre Billard (1922–2016), French journalist and film critic
