= Topeka Airport =

Topeka Airport can refer to several airports in Topeka, Kansas:

- Topeka Regional Airport
- Philip Billard Municipal Airport
