= Sunflower Aerodrome Gliderport =

Airport in Reno County, Kansas, U.S.

- IATA: none; ICAO: none; FAA LID: SN76

Summary
- Airport type: Private
- Owner: Sunflower Soaring Foundation
- Serves: Hutchinson, Kansas
- Location: Yoder Township, Reno County
- In use: Established in 1971
- Elevation AMSL: 1,582 ft / 482 m
- Coordinates: 37°55′35″N 097°54′22″W
- Interactive map of Sunflower Aerodrome Gliderport

Runways
Direction	Length		Surface
Direction	ft	m	Surface
4/22	4,200	1,280	Concrete
13/31	4,200	1,280	Concrete
17/35	7,000	2,134	Asphalt

Statistics
- Based aircraft: 24
- Source: Federal Aviation Administration

Sunflower Aerodrome Gliderport (FAA LID: SN76) is a private glider airport in Reno County, Kansas, United States. It is located eight miles (7.0 nmi; 13 km) south of Hutchinson, and two miles (3.2 km) west-southwest of Yoder. It was opened in 1971. The facility is used for glider flying. It is a private facility, and prior arrangements are needed for its use.

== History ==
The facility was built during World War II by the United States Navy and named Naval Air Station Hutchinson. It was an active naval aviation facility from 1942 to 1946. After the end of World War II it was briefly a civil airport known as Yoder Commercial Airport. It was reopened by the Navy as a naval air station in 1952 with a training role for Naval Air Reserve personnel.

In 1957, the Navy closed its facilities and the base was taken over by the Kansas Air National Guard's 117th Fighter Interceptor Squadron, later redesignated as the 117th Tactical Reconnaissance Squadron and the 190th Tactical Reconnaissance Group (190 TRG), flying EB-57 Canberra jet reconnaissance aircraft. It was also used by the United States Air Force's Air Defense Command as a general surveillance radar facility. During its Air Defense Command use, the radar site was known as Hutchinson Air Force Station, while the operational airfield, flight line and associated infrastructure was known as Hutchinson Air National Guard Base.

The Kansas Air National Guard moved the 190 TRG and its aircraft to Forbes AFB in 1967, and in 1968 the Air Defense Command closed its radar site, marking an end to all military activity at the airfield. It is now currently used as a civilian glider port, and is rented and used by the WSA, KSA, and SSA organizations.

== Facilities and aircraft ==
The facility covers an area of 400 acres (160 ha) at an elevation of 1,582 feet (482 m) above mean sea level. It had three runways:

- 17/35 is 7,000 by 200 feet (2,134 by 61 m) with an asphalt surface and is the only active runway now in use. Other runways have either been destroyed or occupied by farming operations, privately owned by other parties. The south east section of the original base is now owned by Kansas Law Enforcement Training Center and was renovated specifically for police driver training.

There are 24 aircraft based at this facility: 83% glider and 17% single-engine.
