= Billard =

Billard may refer to:

- Billard (surname), a list of people with the surname
- French for the word Billiard; see Billiard
- Établissements Billard, a French railway rolling stock construction company
- Philip Billard Municipal Airport, airport in Kansas, United States

== See also ==
- Billiard
- Bollard (disambiguation)
