= Zawieja =

Zawieja is a Polish surname. Notable people with the surname include:

- Andrzej Zawieja (born 1940), Polish Olympic sailor
- Martin Zawieja (born 1963), West German weightlifter
- Philippe Zawieja (fl. 1991–present), French psychologist
