= 190th Air Refueling Wing =

US Air Force unit

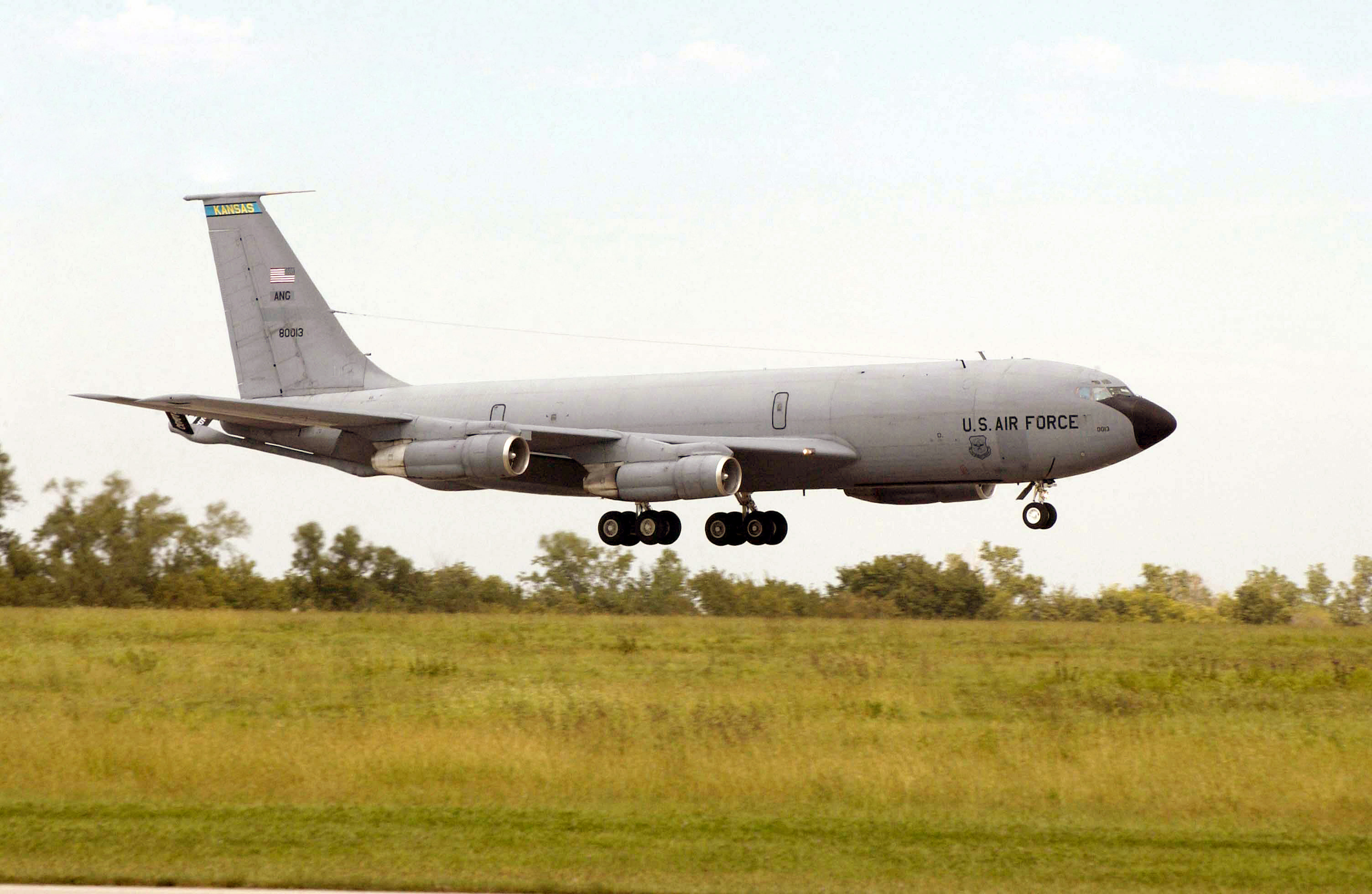
- A Kansas ANG KC-135E landing after its last mission before retirement, 2004
- Active: 1962 – present
- Country: United States
- Allegiance: Kansas
- Branch: Air National Guard
- Type: Wing
- Role: Aerial refueling
- Size: 900+
- Part of: Kansas Air National Guard
- Garrison/HQ: Forbes Field Air National Guard Base, Topeka, Kansas
- Tail code: Blue tail stripe "Kansas" in yellow letters
- Website: https://www.190arw.ang.af.mil/

Commanders
- Current commander: Colonel Marjorie Durkes

Insignia
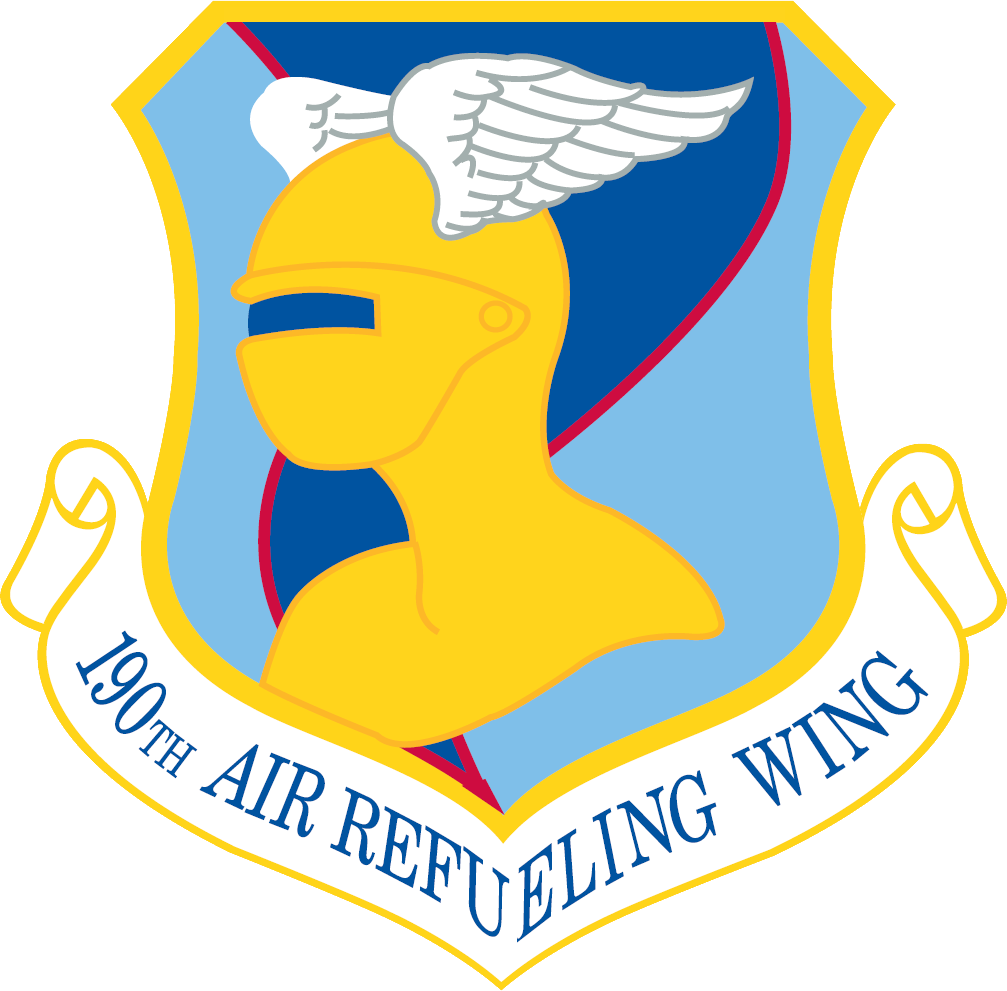
- 190th Air Refueling Wing emblem

The 190th Air Refueling Wing (190 ARW) is a unit of the Kansas Air National Guard, stationed at Forbes Field Air National Guard Base, Topeka, Kansas. If activated to federal service, the Wing is gained by the United States Air Force Air Mobility Command.

== Overview ==
The 190th Air Refueling Wing (ARW) provides in-flight refueling of fighters, bombers and other aircraft using Boeing KC-135 Stratotankers.

== Units ==
The 190th ARW comprises four main organizations as well as the Wing Headquarters:

- 190th Operations Group

117th Air Refueling Squadron

- 190th Maintenance Support Group
- 190th Mission Support Group
- 190th Medical Group

== History ==
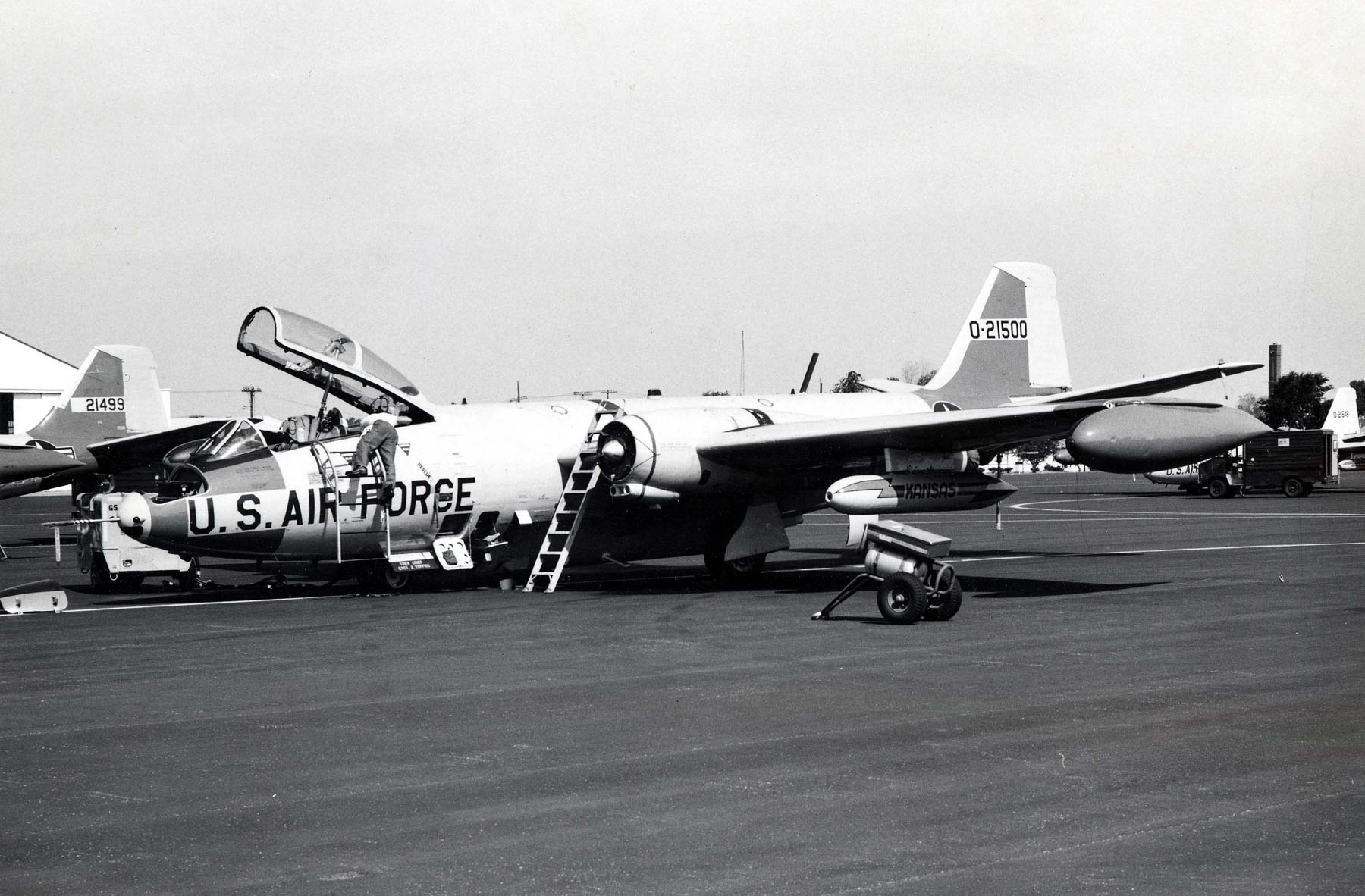
A 117th DSES EB-57B, in the 1970s

On 15 October 1962, the Kansas Air National Guard 117th Tactical Reconnaissance Squadron was authorized to expand to a group level, and the 190th Tactical Reconnaissance Group was established by the National Guard Bureau. The 117th TRS becoming the group's flying squadron. Other squadrons assigned into the group were the 190th Headquarters, 190th Material Squadron (Maintenance), 190th Combat Support Squadron, and the 190th USAF Dispensary.

The unit continued to operate its RB-57A/B Canberra photo-reconnaissance aircraft at Hutchinson ANGB until 1967, when the 190th TRG and its personnel, aircraft and equipment permanently relocated to Forbes AFB, near Topeka after Strategic Air Command vacated its facilities and transferred Forbes AFB to the Tactical Air Command. The 117th continued to operate the RB-57s until 1972 when the aged aircraft were retired and sent to AMARC at Davis-Monthan AFB, Arizona.

In return the 190th began to receive the Martin B-57G variant that were modified as night intruders for use in the Vietnam War under a project known as Tropic Moon. B-57Bs were modified with a low light level television camera plus a forward-looking infrared (FLIR) set and a laser guidance system. The laser guidance system now made it possible to carry four 500-lb "smart bombs" on the underwing pylons. With the receipt of the B-57Gs from their combat service in Thailand, the unit was redesignated as the 190th Tactical Bombardment Group on 12 June 1972. The service of the B-57Gs was short, as operation of these B-57Gs proved to be expensive, and the aircraft were hard to maintain in the field. They served until 1974, when they were consigned to storage at Davis Monthan AFB.

Forbes AFB was ordered closed by the Department of Defense as part of a post-Vietnam reduction in force on 17 April 1973. Most of the facility was turned over for civilian use, however the 190th TBG retained a small portion of the base, being renamed Forbes Field Air National Guard Base.

In April 1974, the unit converted to EB-57B Canberra electronic countermeasures aircraft and became the 190th Defense Systems Evaluation Group. The 190th deployed aircraft to bases throughout the US, Canada, and Europe providing Electronic Counter-Measure (ECM) training and evaluation services to the various Aircraft Control and Warning (Radar) Squadrons. The 117th also used the EB-57 as faker target aircraft against F-102 Delta Dagger and F-106 Delta Dart interceptors. The 190th operated the aircraft until 1978 when they were retired as part of the draw-down of Aerospace Defense Command.

=== Air refueling ===
In 1978, the 190th was transferred to Strategic Air Command, being equipped with the KC-135A Stratotanker and began an air refueling mission; one it retains to the present day. In 1984 the 117th was upgraded to the KC-135E and in 1990, the 190th was the first unit to arrive in Saudi Arabia in August 1990 for service during the 1991 Gulf Crisis, being assigned to the 1709th Air Refueling Wing (Provisional) at King Abdul Aziz Air Base, Jeddah, Saudi Arabia. The 117th flew air refueling missions in support of Operation Desert Shield and later Operation Desert Storm; remaining in the middle east until returning to Forbes AGB in March 1991.

The 190th gaining command shifted to the Air Mobility Command (AMC) with the disestablishment of SAC in 1992, and in 1995 the Group's status was expanded to a Wing. During 1999, the 190th deployed twice to Incirlik Air Base, Turkey, in support of Operation Northern Watch, refueling Allied aircraft over the northern No-Fly Zone in Iraq.

In its 2005 BRAC Recommendations, DoD recommended to realign McConnell Air National Guard (ANG) Base by relocating the 184th Air Refueling Wing (ANG) nine KC-135R aircraft to the 190th Air Refueling Wing at Forbes Field AGS, which would retire its eight assigned KC-135E aircraft. The 184th Air Refueling Wing's operations and maintenance manpower would transfer with the aircraft to Forbes. Realigning ANG KC-135R aircraft from McConnell to Forbes would replace the 190th's aging, higher maintenance KC-135E aircraft with newer models while retaining the experienced personnel from one of the highest-ranking reserve component tanker bases.

In June 2007, the 190 ARW gained custody of all KC-135R aircraft from the 184th ARW. This action consolidated all of the Kansas ANG's KC-135R assets into a single wing located at Forbes Field. The 184 ARW was subsequently redesignated as the 184th Intelligence Wing (184 IW), a non-flying unit at McConnell AFB.

In March 2026, elements of the 190 ARW deployed to support the war in Iran as part of Operation Epic Fury.

=== Lineage ===
- Designated 190th Tactical Reconnaissance Group, and allotted to Kansas ANG, 1962

Extended federal recognition and activated, 15 Oct 1962
Redesignated: 190th Bombardment Group (Tactical), 12 Jun 1972
Redesignated: 190th Defense Systems Evaluation Group, 6 Apr 1974
Redesignated: 190th Air Refueling Group, 1 Apr 1978
Status changed from Group to Wing, 8 July 1978
Redesignated: 190th Air Refueling Wing, 8 July 1978

=== Assignments ===
- Kansas Air National Guard, 15 October 1962

Gained by: Tactical Air Command
Gained by: 24th Air Division, Aerospace Defense Command, 6 April 1974
Gained by: 26th Air Division, Aerospace Defense Command, 1 October 1977
Gained by: Strategic Air Command, 1 April 1978
Gained by: Air Combat Command, 1 June 1992
Gained by: Air Mobility Command, 1 June 1993 – present

=== Components ===
- 190th Operations Group, 11 October 1995 – present
- 117th Tactical Reconnaissance (Later Bombardment, Defense Systems Evaluation, Air Refueling) Squadron, 15 October 1962 – present

=== Stations ===
- Hutchinson Air National Guard Base, Kansas, 18 October 1962
- Forbes Air Force Base, Kansas, 11 Aug 1967
- Forbes Field Air National Guard Base, Kansas, 17 April 1973 – present

=== Aircraft ===
- RB-57A/B Canberra, 1958–1972
- B-57G Canberra, 1972–1973
- RB-57B/E Canberra, 1973–1978
- KC-135A Stratotanker, 1978–1984
- KC-135E Stratotanker, 1984–2006
- KC-135R Stratotanker, 2006–present

=== Decorations ===
- Air Force Outstanding Unit Award
