= Edith Bernardin =

French librarian and historian (1903–1994)

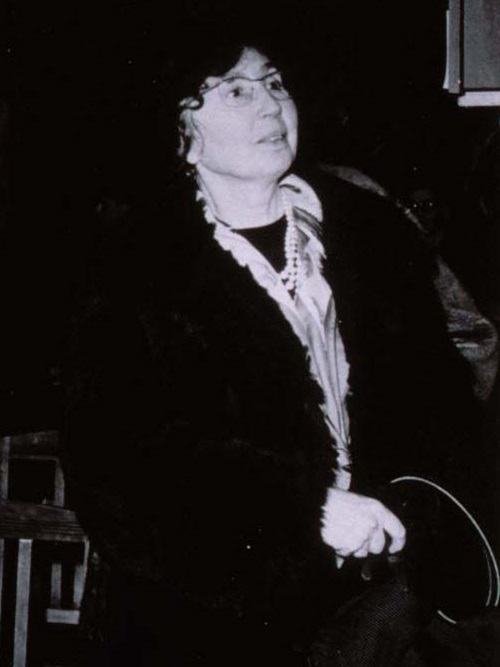
- Born: 21 July 1903; Vernaison, France
- Died: 15 August 1994 (aged 91); Schiltigheim

Academic background
- Education: Université de Strasbourg
- Thesis: Jean-Marie Roland, Ministre de l'intérieur : essai sur l'administration révolutionnaire 1792 -1793 (1957)

Edith Bernardin (21 July 1903 – 15 August 1994) was a French librarian and historian.

She was appointed to the National Academic Library of Strasbourg, where she headed a department of the Office of Private Property and Interests and supervised the restitution of books that the Nazi regime had looted in Alsace during the Second World War .

She was awarded the knight of the Legion of Honour and a commander of the Ordre des Palmes académiques.

== Early life and education ==
Bernadin was born in Vernaison on 21 July 1903, the daughter of Henri Louis Bernadin and Isabelle Humbert. She studied at the University of Paris and the University of Lyon.

In 1957 she completed a doctoral thesis in history titled Jean-Marie Roland, Minister of the Interior. Essay on the Revolutionary Administration, 1792–1793.

== Career ==
She started as an intern at the National Academic Library in Strasbourg in 1928, and over time was promoted to librarian, curator, and chief curator. Starting on 27 August 1939, Bernardin was responsible for storing the library's documents to protect them from the Nazis.

In 1945, Bernardin returned to Strasbourg and took part in the library's reorganization. Starting in 1947 she coordinated this work with the Office of Private Property and Interests. She directed the service for the restitution of books that the Nazi authorities had looted when annexing Alsace. Her mission was to sort the works that the German administration of the library had abandoned three years earlier at the Liberation of Strasbourg in 1944, and then to identify their legitimate owners. She was brought into contact with the librarian Jenny Delsaux, who was supervising the books subcommittee within the Commission for Artistic Recovery in Paris. This work continued until the office closed on 15 June 1950.

From 1962 until her retirement in 1973, Bernardin was chief curator at the library.

While retired she continued her historical research on civil status in Strasbourg during the French Revolution.

== Selected publications ==
- Bernardin, Edith (1933). Les idées religieuses de madame Roland (in French). Paris: Les Belles lettres. OCLC 1536072.
- Bernardin, Édith (1964). Jean Marie Roland et le ministère de l'intérieur 1792–1793 (in undetermined language). Paris: Soc. des Etudes Robespierristes. OCLC 1067953542.
- Bernardin, Edith (1986), Strasbourg et l'Institution de l'État Civil Laic au début de la révolution francaise (in French), Editions d'Alsae-Colmar, OCLC 497253310
- Bernardin, Édith (1989). La loi d'état-civil dans le Bas-Rhin : son application de 1793 à 1799 (in French). S.l.: s.n. OCLC 494380089.

== Honors and awards ==
She was awarded the Knight of the Legion of Honour and the Ordre des Palmes académiques.
