= 117th Air Refueling Squadron =

Kansas Air National Guard unit

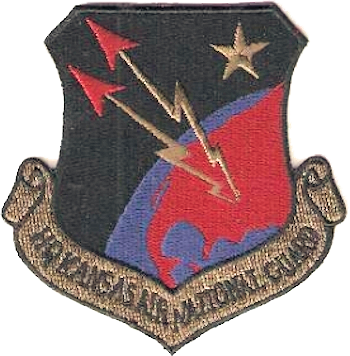
117th Air Refueling Squadron

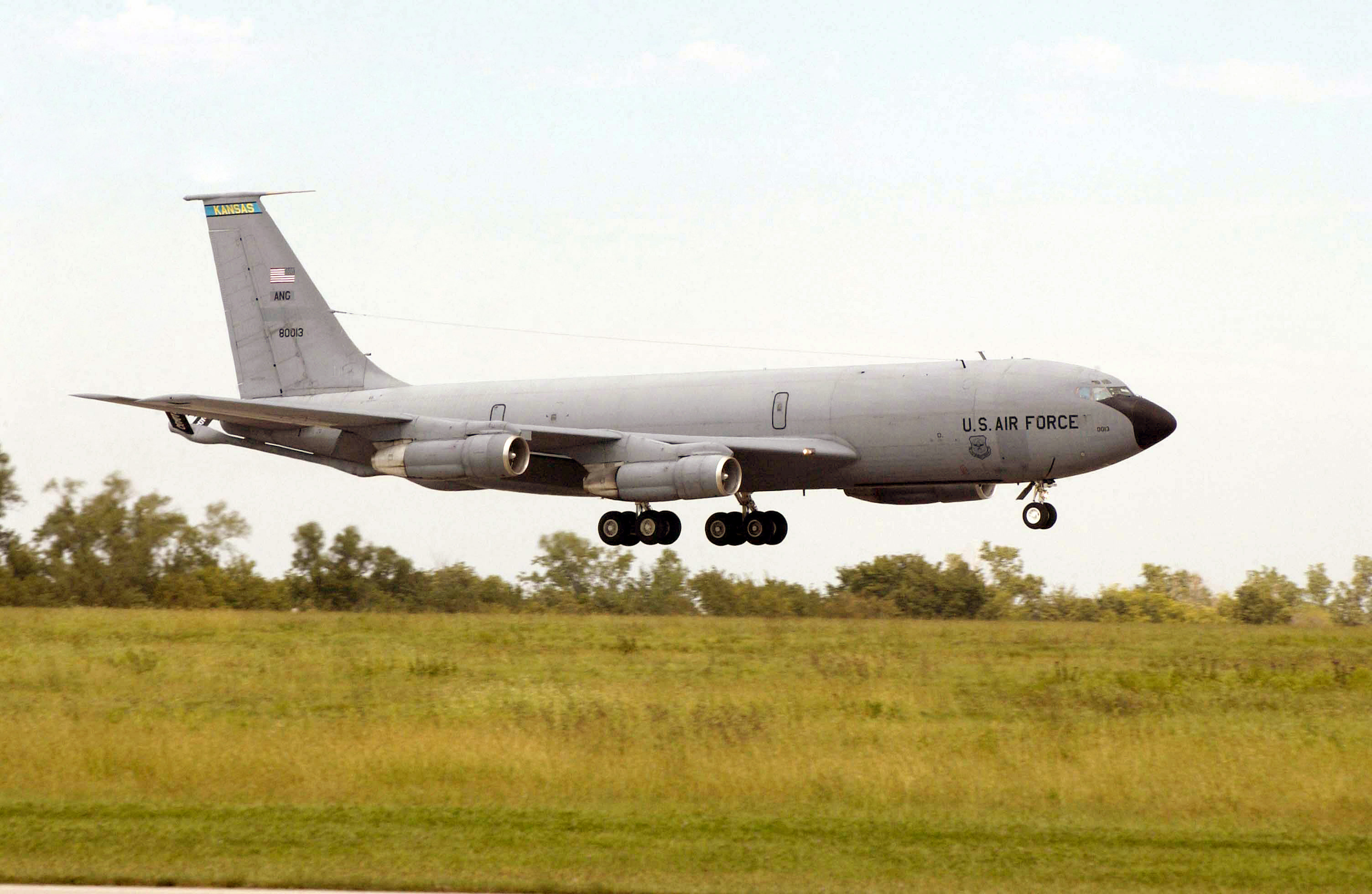
- Squadron KC-135E Stratotanker lands following its final mission at Forbes Field (Note: Aircraft was originally built as Boeing KC-135A-BN, serial 58-0013. Later modified as KC-135E, Sent to AMRC on 7 March 2007. Baugher, Joe (27 July 2023). "1958 USAF Serial Numbers". Joe Baugher. Picture taken on 11 September 2004.)
- Active: 1942–1946; 1948–1953; 1953–1956; 1957–present
- Country: United States
- Allegiance: Kansas
- Branch: Air National Guard
- Type: Squadron
- Role: Aerial refueling
- Part of: Kansas Air National Guard
- Garrison/HQ: Forbes Field Air National Guard Base, Topeka, Kansas
- Nickname: Kansas Coyotes
- Engagements: Mediterranean Theater of Operations; Pacific Ocean Theater of World War II
- Decorations: Distinguished Unit Citation; French Croix de Guerre with PalmAir Force Outstanding Unit Award

Insignia
- 117th Air Refueling Squadron emblem

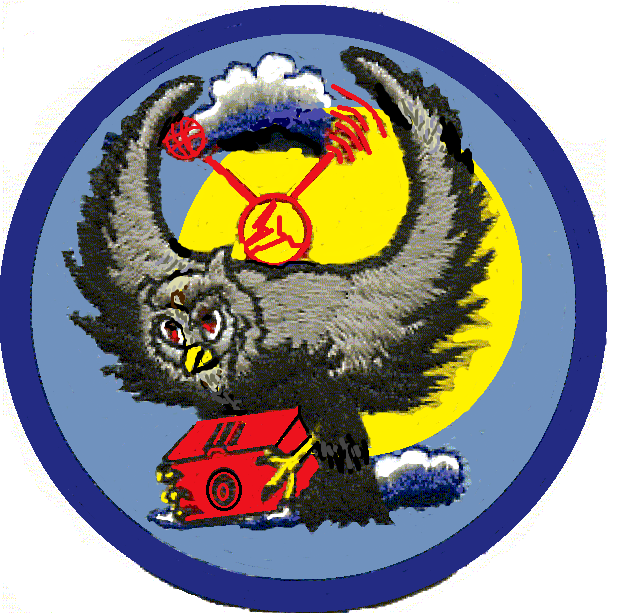
- 117 Tactical Reconnaissance Sq emblem (Note: Adopted c. August 1958. The 117th Fighter-Interceptor Squadron emblem also included an owl, although no image of this emblem is available. The 117th's First Unit Patch. An unapproved modification of the emblem replaces the camera held by the owl with a gas can, and is labeled for the 117th Tactical Air Refueling Squadron, a designation the squadron never had.)

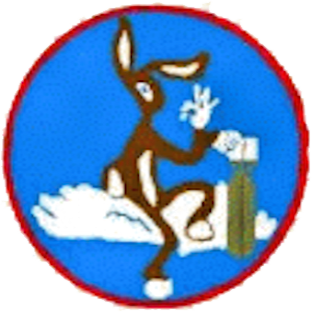
- 440th Bombardment Squadron emblem

The 117th Air Refueling Squadron is a unit of the Kansas Air National Guard 190th Air Refueling Wing located at Forbes Field Air National Guard Base, Topeka, Kansas. The 117th is equipped with the Boeing KC-135R Stratotanker.

The squadron was first activated in June 1942 as the 440th Bombardment Squadron and equipped with the Martin B-26 Marauder. After training in the United States, it deployed to the Mediterranean Theater of Operations, where its actions in combat earned it two Distinguished Unit Citation and a French Croix de Guerre with Palm. In late 1944, it was withdrawn from combat operations and returned to the United States, where it converted to the Douglas A-26 Invader. It moved to Okinawa, where it engaged in combat against Japan. Following V-J Day, the squadron returned to the United States and was inactivated.

In 1946, the squadron was allotted to the National Guard and redesignated the 117th Bombardment Squadron. It again equipped with Intruders as part of the Pennsylvania Air National Guard. It was mobilized in the spring of 1951 and moved to Langley Air Force Base, Virginia, where it served as a B-16 Invader training unit until returning to state control in January 1953. On its return to Pennsylvania, it became the 117th Fighter-Bomber Squadron. However, the unit was unable to meet minimum manning requirements for Guard units and was inactivated and withdrawn from the National Guard in July 1956.

In 1957, the squadron returned to Air Guard service as the 117th Fighter-Interceptor Squadron of the Kansas Air National Guard. Before becoming fully operational as a fighter unit, the squadron was redesignated the 117th Tactical Reconnaissance Squasdron and equipped with Martin RB-57 Canberras. It continued to fly other models of the Canberra, becoming the 117th Bombardment Squadron in 1972 and the 117th Defense Systems Evaluation Squadron in 1974. It converted to the KC-135 Stratotanker and the air refueling mission in 1978.

== Mission ==
The mission of the squadron is flying the Boeing KC-135 Stratotanker aircraft to support worldwide air refueling. When the Kansas Air National Guard is not mobilized or under federal control, its units report to the governor of Kansas, under the supervision of the state's adjutant general. Under state law, the Air National Guard provides protection of life, property and preserves peace, order and public safety. These missions are accomplished through emergency relief support during natural disasters such as floods, earthquakes and forest fires; search and rescue operations; support to civil defense authorities; maintenance of vital public services and counterdrug operations.

== History ==
=== World War II ===
==== Organization and preparation for combat ====
The squadron was first activated on 26 June 1942 at Barksdale Field, Louisiana, as the 440th Bombardment Squadron, one of the four original squadrons of the 319th Bombardment Group, a Martin B-26 Marauder medium bombardment group. The squadron trained for combat at Barksdale and Harding Field, in Louisiana. The air echelon began ferrying its aircraft to England via the North Atlantic route on 27 August 1942, with the squadron officially moving to RAF Shipdham on 12 September 1942. By late October to early November, (Note: The 319th Group suffered several losses on the ferry flight, as winter weather began to impact the northern ferry route. Other planes were delayed for weather or aircraft malfunctions. As a result, further deployments of B-26 units to Europe travelled over the South Atlantic route, Freeman, pp. 15, 55.) squadron aircraft were in place at RAF Horsham St Faith. The ground echelon sailed on the RMS Queen Mary on 5 September.

==== Mediterranean Theater of Operations ====
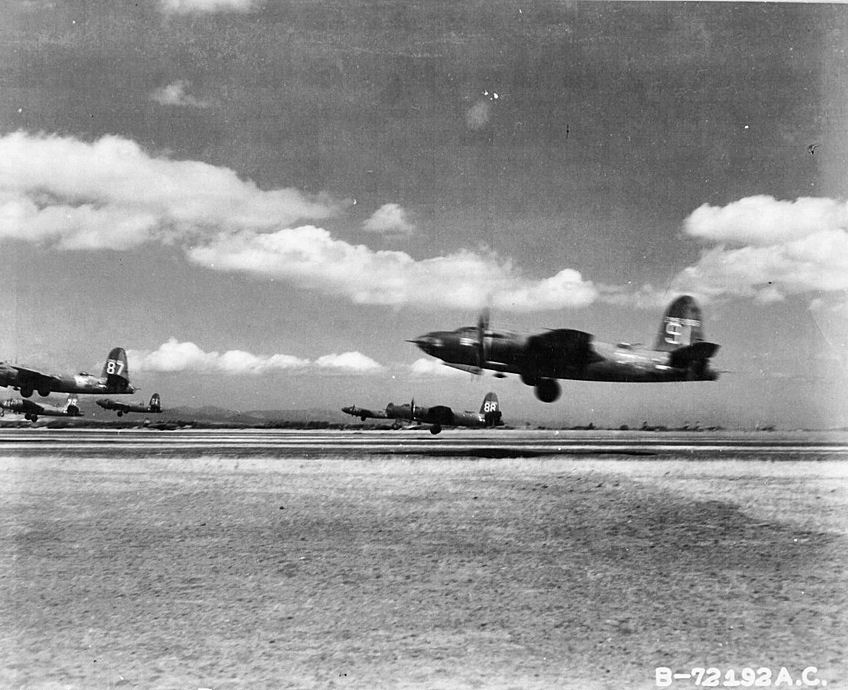
Squadron B-26 Marauders taking off from Decimomannu Airfield (Note: The 319th Group was trying these 6-plane take offs to save time forming up for missions.)

The air echelon of the squadron departed England on 12 November 1942 for Saint-Leu Airfield, Algeria. Although this was supposed to be a simple repositioning flight, it became the squadron's introduction to combat when the 319th Group formation strayed from its planned route and flew over occupied France, where they were attacked by German aircraft. Some of the ground echelon had made the amphibious landing at Arzeu beach on 8 November. However, it was not until the following March that all aircraft had made the move to North Africa.

The squadron began combat quickly, flying its first sorties during November. Until March 1943, it made strikes at enemy targets in Tunisia, including railroads, airfields, and harbor installations. It struck enemy shipping in the Mediterranean Sea to block reinforcements and supplies from reaching opposing Axis forces.

In March 1943, the squadron was withdrawn from combat and moved to Oujda Airfield, French Morocco for a period of reorganization and training. On 1 June, it moved forward to Sedrata Airfield, Algeria and resumed combat operations. It participated in Operation Corkscrew, the reduction of Pantelleria, that month. The following month it provided air support for Operation Husky, the invasion of Sicily. After Sicily fell, it directed most of its attacks on targets in Italy. It supported Operation Avalanche, the invasion of Italy, in September. These operations concentrated on airfields, marshalling yards airfields, viaducts, gun sites and other defense positions. In November, it moved from Africa to Decimomannu Airfield, Sardinia to shorten the range to targets in central Italy.

From January to March 1944, the squadron supported Allied ground forces as they advanced in the Battle of Monte Cassino and Operation Shingle, the landings at Anzio. As ground forces approached Rome, it flew interdiction missions. On 3 March 1944, the squadron earned a Distinguished Unit Citation (DUC) for an attack on rail facilities in Rome, while carefully avoiding damage to religious and cultural monuments. Eight days later, it earned a second DUC for an attack on marshalling yards in Florence, disrupting communications between Florence and Rome. Its support of French forces between April and June earned the squadron the French Croix de Guerre with Palm.

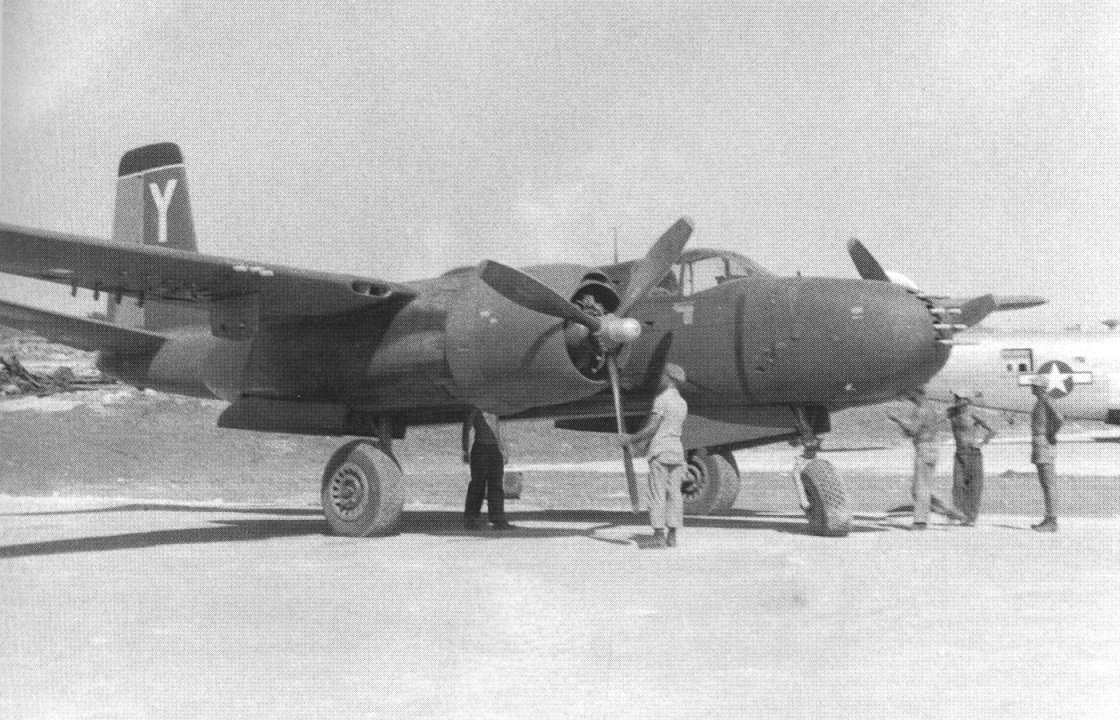
A-26 at Machinato Airfield in 1945

In August and September 1944, the squadron supported Operation Dragoon, the invasion of southern France, moving forward to Serragia Airfield, Corsica the following month. It attacked German supply lines in northern Italy, including bombing bridges over the Po River. It also attacked some targets in Yugoslavia. It continued combat operations while transitioning into the North American B-25 Mitchell from its Marauders. At the end of the year, the squadron was withdrawn from combat and returned to the United States in January 1945 to begin training with the Douglas A-26 Invader in preparation for deployment to the Western Pacific.

==== Combat in the Pacific ====
The squadron completed its training in the new bomber and departed to reenter combat in April 1945. It arrived on Okinawa in early July and was established at Machinato Airfield later that month. It flew its first mission in the Pacific on 16 July 1945. It flew missions in China and Japan, attacking airfields, shipping, marshalling yards, industrial centers and other targets until V-J Day. It was briefly assigned to VII Bomber Command when the 319th departed Okinawa on 21 November 1945. The squadron left in December, and was inactivated at the Port of Embarkation on 6 January 1946.

=== Pennsylvania Air National Guard ===
The squadron was redesignated the 117th Bombardment Squadron and allotted to the National Guard on 24 May 1946. It was organized at Philadelphia International Airport and was extended federal recognition on 17 January 1947. The squadron was again equipped with A-26 Invaders and was assigned to the 53d Fighter Wing until the 111th Bombardment Group was activated on 20 December 1948.

==== Korean War mobilization ====
On 1 April 1951 the 117th Squadron was federalized and brought to active duty due to the Korean War. It moved to Langley Air Force Base, Virginia, where it was assigned to the 4400th Combat Crew Training Group. Its mission was training B-26 Invader aircrews in tactical bombing and night intruder air operations. The crews trained by the 117th were deployed to Far East Air Forces for combat operations with B-26s over North and South Korea or to France for service with the North Atlantic Treaty Organization. On 1 January 1953 the squadron was inactivated and returned to state control, while its personnel and equipment were used to form the 423d Bombardment Squadron, which was simultaneously activated.

==== Fighter operations ====
Returning to Philadelphia, the squadron was redesignated the117th Fighter-Bomber Squadron, receiving F-84F Thunderstreaks. Despite its designation and equipment, the squadron primarily trained in an air defense role, with plans to later assume a tactical mission. In May 1955, the squadron's parent was redesignated the 111th Fighter-Interceptor Group, along with its other squadron, which became the 103d Fighter-Interceptor Squadron and began converting to Lockheed F-94 Starfires. On 1 July 1956, the group organized on the model of Air Defense Command (ADC) units, becoming the 111th Fighter Group (Air Defense) with a single operational squadron. During this period, the 117th Squadron had never reached 60% manning, which was considered the minimum for National Guard units, so it was inactivated and withdrawn from the National Guard. Most personnel were reassigned to other units.

=== Kansas Air National Guard ===
In early 1957, the Kansas Air National Guard received authorization to expand from one to two squadrons. The United States Air Force redesignated the squadron the 117th Fighter-Interceptor Squadron and allotted it to the Kansas Air National Guard, which organized it on 3 January 1957 at Naval Air Station Hutchinson. The squadron drew some of its initial cadre from the 127th Fighter-Interceptor Squadron, which was located at McConnell Air Force Base, Kansas. Initially, Hutchinson lacked ramp space for the 117th's planes and flying operations were conducted from McConnell. It received federal recognition on 23 February 1957. In early 1958, The squadron was equipped with Lockheed F-80C Shooting Stars as an interim measure, and was assigned to the 137th Fighter-Interceptor Group located at Will Rogers Field, Oklahoma.

==== RB-57 Canberra era ====
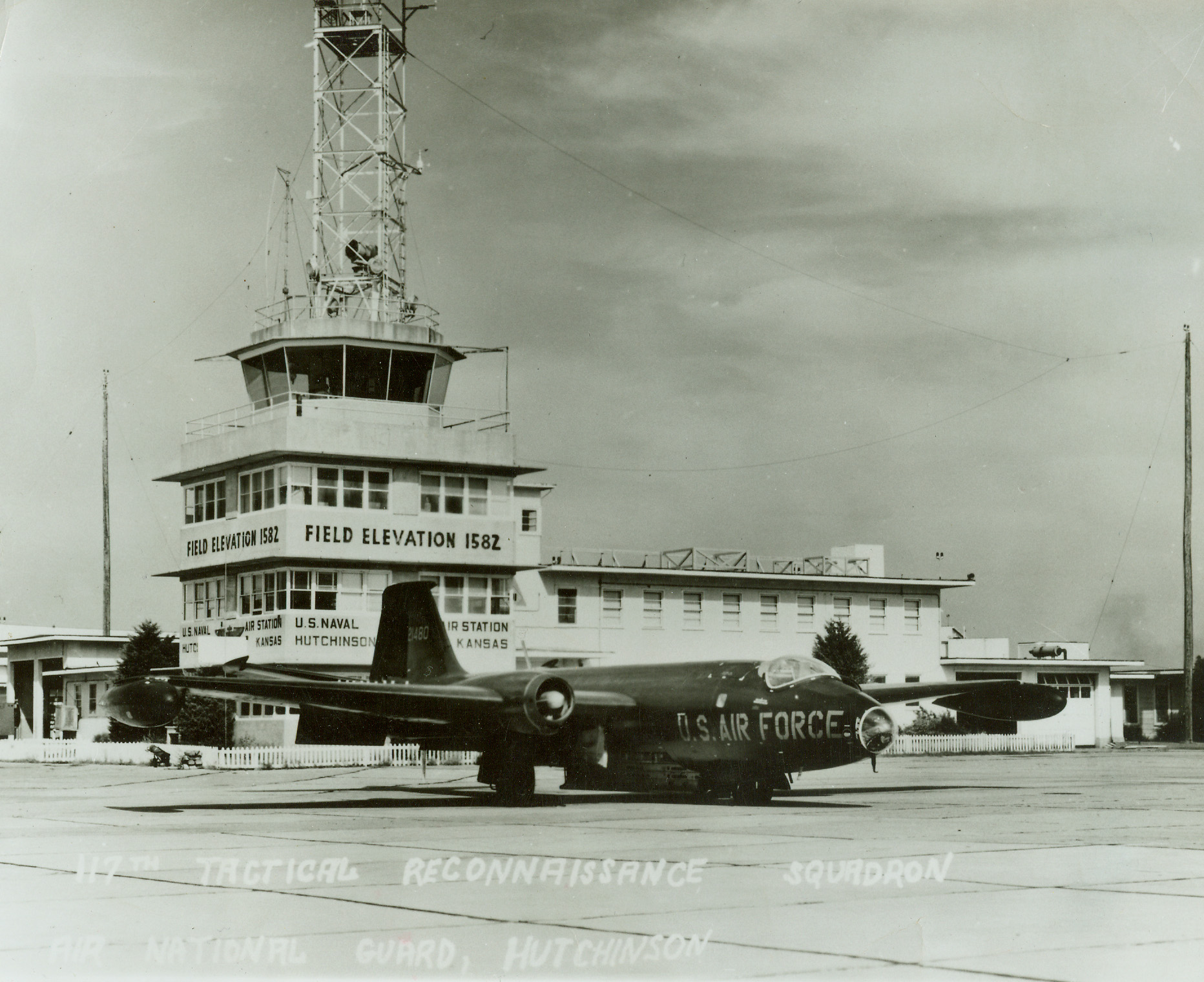
Squadron RB-57A Canberra at Hutchinson ANGB (Note: Aircraft is RB-57A-MA Canberra, serial 52-1480. The B-57As were the only model in United States Service to retain the side by side seating of the English Electric Canberra B.3. This plane is now mounted on a pedestal outside the main gate to Forbes Field. Baugher, Joe (7 October 2023). "1952 USAF Serial Numbers". Joe Baugher.)

The squadron's time as an interceptor squadron lasted little over a year, for in April 1958, it became the 117th Tactical Reconnaissance Squadron and began to replace its fighters with Martin RB-57 Canberras, the reconnaissance version of the B-57. With the introduction of the Douglas RB-66 Destroyer to the active duty reconnaissance inventory, the 117th first received B-57Bs from the 38th Bombardment Wing (Note: Source erroneously refers to the wing as a squadron. The 117th's First Unit Patch.) in April 1958, then began to receive RB-57As in August and tandem seat RB-57B Canberra photographic reconnaissance aircraft and assumed the tactical reconnaissance mission. The RB-57s were unarmed and painted with a high gloss black paint which was intended to minimize detection by searchlights. With the change in squadron mission came a change in its mobilization gaing conmmand, from ADC to Tactical Air Command (TAC).

In 1959, the squadron began participating in Operation Eye Opener. In this operation, squadron B-57s flew missions to test the effectiveness of ADC's systems, foreshadowing its later electronic warfare role. The following year, the squadron began training crews of the 192d Tactical Reconnaissance Squadron of the Nevada Air National Guard on B-47 reconnaissance operations. In the spring of 1962, the squadron deployed aircrews and maintenance personnel to the South Pacific to participate in Operation Bluestraw under the control of the Air Force Special Weapons Center, operating from Christmas Island. (Note: Bluestraw was the code name for Air Force readiness planning for atmospheric testing. Operation Dominic, p. 68.)

Since 1950, the Air National Guard had been organized into wings, a self-sustaining organization, made up of functional groups. Because it was not practical to put an entire wing on a single installation for day to day operations, wing squadrons were located on bases as "augmented squadrons" containing support elements needed to sustain operations. By the law at the time Guardsmen could only be activated as members of a mobilized unit. This meant that, even if only operational and maintenance elements were needed for mobilization, the entire "augmented squadron" had to be called to active duty, including unneeded administrative personnel. This weakness was demonstrated in the partial mobilization of reserve units during the Berlin Crisis of 1961. Approximately one third of the Air National Guard had been mobilized for the crisis in Operation Stair Step. (Note: The 117th was not mobilized for this operation. Kansas Coyotes.) The response was to replace the "augmented squadron" with a group including functional squadrons that could be mobilized as a group, or individually On 15 October 1962, the 190th Tactical Reconnaissance Group was established, to include 117th as the group's flying squadron. Also assigned to the group initially were the group's headquarters, the 190th Material Squadron (maintenance and supply), 190th Combat Support Squadron (base and personnel support), and the 190th USAF Dispensary (medical).

Beginning in 1963, the Air Force began to deploy B-57s to Viet Nam. These deployments increased, even as the last active duty B-57 units were scheduled for inactivation. Active duty facilities were not available to train the aircrews needed for combat. The Air Force expanded the 117th to provide for this training, and virtually all Canberra crews deployed to Viet Nam early in the war were trained by the 117th. At its peak, the squadron was training six crews a month.

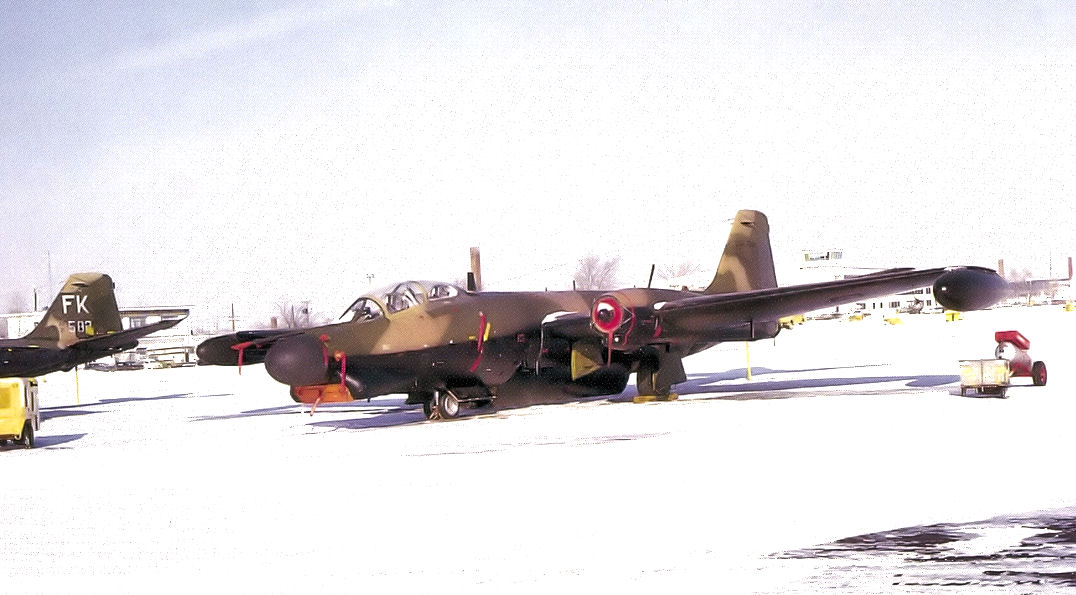
190th Tactical Reconnaissance Group B-57G Canberras 1973

The unit continued to operate its Canberras at Hutchinson until 1967, when the 190th Group and its personnel, aircraft and equipment relocated to Forbes Air Force Base, near Topeka after Strategic Air Command (SAC) vacated its facilities and transferred Forbes to TAC. In 1971, it was announced that the squadron would be replacing its Canberras with McDonnell RF-4 Phantom IIs. This program began implementation, with a detachment of the 190th Group arriving at Tan Son Nhut Airport to begin arrangements for the transfer of planes from the 460th Tactical Reconnaissance Wing. Most of its RB-57s were sent to the Aberdeen Proving Ground for destructive testing, and four to the Aerospace Maintenance and Regeneration Center (AMRC) at Davis-Monthan Air Force Base, Arizona.

Although this transition had proceeded so far that RF-4 support equipment was being shipped to Forbes, instead, in January 1972, the squadron began to conver to the Martin B-57G variant that were modified as night intruders for use in the Vietnam War under a project known as Tropic Moon. B-57Bs were modified with a low light level television camera plus a forward-looking infrared set and a laser guidance system. The laser guidance system now made it possible to carry four 500 pounds (230 kg) smart bomb on the underwing pylons. With the receipt of the B-57Gs from their combat service in Thailand, the unit was redesignated as the 117th Bombardment Squadron on 12 June 1972. The service of the B-57Gs was short, as operation of these B-57Gs proved to be expensive, and the aircraft were hard to maintain in the field. They served until 1974, when they were consigned to storage at Davis Monthan Air Force Base.

Forbes was closed by the DoD as part of a post-Vietnam reduction in force on 17 April 1973. Most of the facility was turned over for civilian use, however the 190th retained a small portion of the base, which was renamed Forbes Field Air National Guard Base.

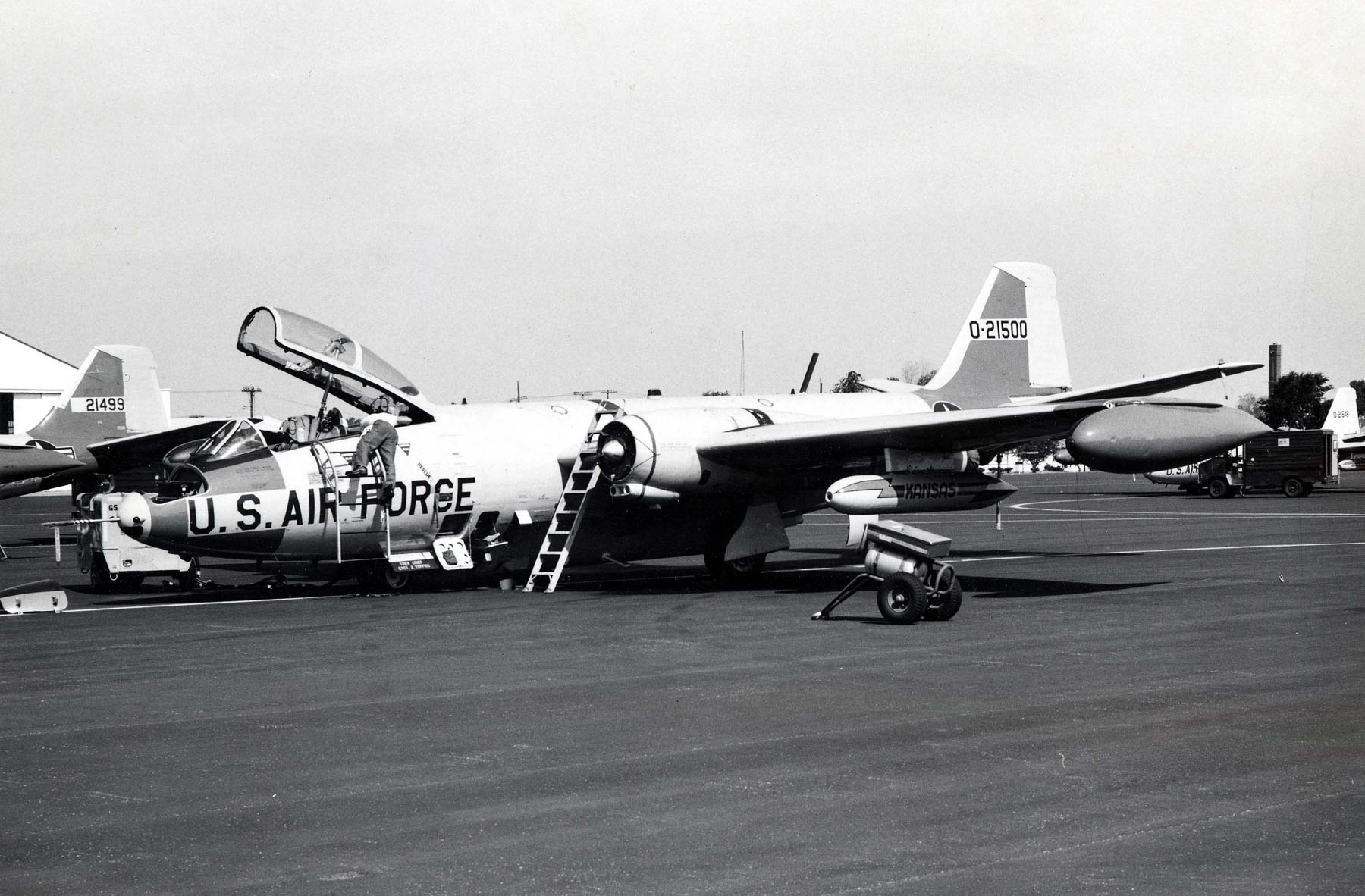
Squadron EB-57B Canberra at Forbes (Note: Aircraft is EB-57B, serial 52-1500, originally built as Martin B-57B-MA Canberra. This plane is on display at the Vermont Air National Guard Base in Burlington, Vermont. In the background is EB-57B 52-1499 (originally Martin B-57B-MA Canberra). This plane flew combat missions in Viet Nam with the 8th Bombardment Squadron. It was restored to its B-57B combat configuration and is on display at the National Museum of the United States Air Force. Baugher, Joe (7 October 2023). "1952 USAF Serial Numbers". Joe Baugher. Archived from the original on 23 July 2011.)

In April 1974, the unit converted to EB-57B Canberra electronic countermeasures aircraft and became the 117th Defense Systems Evaluation Squadron, performing as part of its mission what it had done in Operation Eye Opener in the 1950s. The 190th deployed aircraft to bases throughout the US, Canada, and Europe providing electronic countermeasure training and evaluation services to the various aircraft control and warning (radar) squadrons. Common operations included Operation College Dropout (testing of Nike radars) Operation Saga (tests of fighter interceptor squadrons), Operation Vigilant Overview (multi-region test of ADC capabilities). The 190th operated the aircraft until 1978.

==== Air Refueling ====
On 1 April 1978, SAC became the gaining command for the renamed 117th Air Refueling Squadron, which was equipped with the Boeing KC-135A Stratotanker and began an air refueling mission; one it retains to the present day. Beginning in July 1979, the squadron began placing a KC-135 on alert to support SAC war plans. In 1984 the 117th was upgraded to the KC-135E and in 1990, the 117th was the first unit to arrive in Saudi Arabia in August 1990 for service during the 1991 Gulf Crisis, being assigned to the 1709th Air Refueling Wing (Provisional) at King Abdul Aziz Air Base, Jeddah, Saudi Arabia. The 117th flew air refueling missions in support of Operation Desert Shield and later Operation Desert Storm; remaining in the middle east until returning to Forbes in March 1991.

The 190th gaining command shifted to Air Mobility Command with the disestablishment of SAC in 1992, and in 1995 the group expanded to a wing. During 1999, the 117th deployed twice to Incirlik Air Base, Turkey, in support of Operation Northern Watch, refueling Allied aircraft over the northern no-fly zone in Iraq.

In its 2005 BRAC Recommendations, DoD recommended to realign McConnell Air National Guard Base by relocating the 184th Air Refueling Wing (ANG) nine KC-135R aircraft to the 190th Air Refueling Wing at Forbes, which would retire its eight assigned KC-135E aircraft. The 184th Air Refueling Wing 's operations and maintenance manpower would transfer with the aircraft to Forbes. Realigning ANG KC-135R aircraft from McConnell to Forbes would replace the 190th's aging, higher maintenance KC-135E aircraft with newer models while retaining the experienced personnel from one of the highest-ranking reserve component tanker bases.

In June 2007, the 190th gained custody of all KC-135R aircraft from the 184th Wing. This action consolidated all of the Kansas ANG's KC-135R assets into a single wing located at Forbes Field. The 184th Wing was subsequently redesignated the 184th Intelligence Wing, a non-flying unit.

== Lineage ==
- Constituted as the 440th Bombardment Squadron (Medium) on 19 June 1942

Activated on 26 June 1942
Redesignated 440th Bombardment Squadron, Medium c. 1944
Redesignated 440th Bombardment Squadron, Light on 3 February 1945
Inactivated on 4 January 1946

- Redesignated 117th Bombardment Squadron, Light and allotted to the National Guard on 24 May 1946

Extended federal recognition on 17 January 1947
Ordered to active service on 1 April 1951
Inactivated 1 January 1953
Relieved from active duty, redesignated 117th Fighter-Bomber Squadron, and returned to state control on 1 January 1953
Activated on 1 January 1953
Inactivated on 1 July 1956 and withdrawn from the Air National Guard

- Redesignated 117th Fighter-Interceptor Squadron and Allotted to Kansas Air National Guard on 1 February 1957

Extended federal recognition and activated on 23 February 1957
Redesignated 117th Tactical Reconnaissance Squadron on 10 April 1958
Redesignated 117th Bombardment Squadron, Tactical on 12 June 1972
Redesignated 117th Tactical Bombardment Squadron on 19 September 1973
Redesignated 117th Defense Systems Evaluation Squadron c. 6 April 1974
Redesignated 117th Air Refueling Squadron, Heavy on 8 July 1978
Redesignated 117th Air Refueling Squadron c. 16 March 1992

=== Assignments ===
- 319th Bombardment Group, 26 June 1942
- VII Bomber Command, 18 December 1945 – 4 January 1946
- 53d Fighter Wing, 17 January 1947
- 111th Bombardment Group, 20 December 1948
- 4400th Combat Crew Training Group, 1 April 1951 – 1 January 1953
- 111th Fighter-Bomber Group 1 January 1953 – 1 July 1956z
- 137th Fighter-Interceptor Group (later 137th Fighter Group), 23 February 1957
- 123rd Tactical Reconnaissance Group, 10 April 1958
- 127th Tactical Reconnaissance Group, December 1958
- 190th Tactical Reconnaissance Group (later 190th Bombardment Group, 190th Tactical Bombardment Group, 190th Defense Systems Evaluation Group, 190th Air Refueling Group, 190th Air Refueling Wing), 15 October 1962
- 190th Operations Group, 11 October 1995 – present

=== Stations ===
- Barksdale Field, Louisiana, 26 June 1942
- Harding Field, Louisiana, 8–27 August 1942
- RAF Shipdham (AAF-115), England, 12 September 1942
- RAF Horsham St Faith (AAF-123), England, c. 4 October 1942 – 21 October 1942
- Saint-Leu Airfield, Algeria, c. 10 November 1942
- Oran Tafaraoui Airport, Algeria, 18 November 1942
- Maison Blanche Airport, Algeria, 21 November 1942
- Telergma Airfield, Algeria, 18 December 1942
- Oujda Airfield, French Morocco, 3 March 1943
- Rabat-Salé Airport, French Morocco, 25 April 1943
- Sedrata Airfield, Algeria, 1 June 1943
- Djedeida Airfield, Tunisia, 26 June 1943
- Decimomannu Airfield, Sardinia, 1 November 1943
- Serragia Airfield, Corsica, c. 21 September 1944 – c. 9 January 1945
- Bradley Field, Connecticut, 25 January 1945
- Columbia Army Air Base, South Carolina, c. 28 February – 27 April 1945
- Kadena Airfield, Okinawa, 2 July 1945
- Machinato Airfield, Okinawa, 21 July – 8 December 1945
- Fort Lewis, Washington, 2–4 January 1946
- Philadelphia International Airport], 17 January 1947
- Langley Air Force Base, Virginia, 1 April 1951 – 1 January 1953
- Philadelphia International Airport, 1 January 1953 – 1 July 1956
- Naval Air Station Hutchinson (later Hutchinson Air National Guard Base), Kansas, 23 February 1957
- Forbes Air Force Base (later Forbes Field Air National Guard Base), Kansas, 11 August 1967 – present

=== Aircraft ===
- Martin B-26 Marauder, 1942–1944
- North American B-25 Mitchell, 1944–1945
- Douglas A-26 (B-26 after 1948) Invader, 1945–1946, 1947–1952
- Lockheed F-80C Shooting Star, 1953–1956; 1957–1958
- Martin RB-57A Canberra, 1958–1972
- Martin RB-57B Canberra, 1958–1972, 1973–1978
- Martin B-57C Canberra, 1958-unknown (Note: The B-57C was the pilot training version of the Canberra, equipped with dual controls. 117th's Early Years.)
- Martin B-57G Canberra, 1972–1973
- Martin RB-57E Canberra, 1973–1978
- Boeing KC-135A Stratotanker, 1978–1984
- Boeing KC-135E Stratotanker, 1984–2006
- Boeing KC-135R Stratotanker, 2006–present

=== Awards and campaigns ===
Award streamer	Award	Dates	Notes
	Distinguished Unit Citation	3 March 1944	Rome, Italy, 440th Bombardment Squadron
	Distinguished Unit Citation	11 March 1944	Florence, Italy, 440th Bombardment Squadron
	Air Force Outstanding Unit Award	15 April 1977-14 April 1978	117th Defense Systems Evaluation Squadron
	Air Force Outstanding Unit Award	1 July 1983-30 June 1984	117th Air Refueling Squadron
	Air Force Outstanding Unit Award	1 January 1991-31 December 1993	117th Air Refueling Squadron
	French Croix de Guerre with Palm	April, May and June 1944	440th Bombardment Squadron

Campaign Streamer	Campaign	Dates	Notes
	Air Combat, EAME Theater	12 September 1942 – 8 January 1945	440th Bombardment Squadron
	Algeria-French Morocco (with Arrowhead)	10 November 1942 – 11 November 1942	440th Bombardment Squadron
	Tunisia	12 November 1942 – 13 May 1943	440th Bombardment Squadron
	Sicily	14 May 1943 – 17 August 1943	440th Bombardment Squadron
	Naples-Foggia	18 August 1943 – 21 January 1944	440th Bombardment Squadron
	Anzio	22 January 1944 – 24 May 1944	440th Bombardment Squadron
	Rome-Arno	22 January 1944 – 9 September 1944	440th Bombardment Squadron
	Southern France	15 August 1944 – 14 September 1944	440th Bombardment Squadron
	North Apennines	10 September 1944 – 8 January 1945	440th Bombardment Squadron
	Air Offensive, Japan	2 July 1945 – 2 September 1945	440th Bombardment Squadron
	Ryukus	2 July 1945	440th Bombardment Squadron
	China Offensive	2 Jul 1945–2 September 1945	440th Bombardment Squadron

== See also ==
- List of Martin B-26 Marauder operators
- List of A-26 Invader operators
