= Alfred Noe =

Austrian academic

- Born: 13 January 1953 (age 73); Stripfing, Austria
- Known for: History of books and library history of the Early Modern Period; social history of literature, mainly concerning the effects of literature on the reader’s mentalities; editions of French and Italian literary works in historic German translations of the Early Modern Period
- Scientific career
- Fields: Romance philology, philosophy and art history
- Workplaces: University of Vienna

Alfred Noe (born 13 January 1953 in Stripfing, Lower Austria) is an Austrian professor of Romance studies at the University of Vienna.

== Biography ==
Noe studied Romance philology, philosophy and art history at the University of Vienna from 1971 to 1980. He obtained a first habilitation in Romance literatures in1988 and a second habilitation in comparative literature in 1996 at the University of Vienna. In 1998 he was appointed Associate professor at the department of Romance Languages at the University of Vienna. From 2000 to 2002 he was Head of the department of Romance Languages and Deputy head of the same department from 2009 to 2014 He is a translator of libretti for the Konzerthaus, Vienna, the Theater an der Wien and for the Salzburg Festival.

== Areas of interest in research and teaching ==
- History of books and library history of the Early Modern Period
- Social history of literature, mainly concerning the effects of literature on the reader's mentalities
- Editions of French and Italian literary works in historic German translations of the Early Modern Period
- The Italian libretto in the 17th and 18th centuries, with a particular regard to the establishing and translating of texts for critical editions of baroque music in Austria
- The dissemination of literary works in from the Romance language areas into German speaking countries, in particular the oeuvre of the Italian poets laureates at the Imperial court in Austria
- The transformative reception of literary traditions as a fundamental concept of the comparative literature in the Early Modern Period

== Editorships and memberships ==
- With Erika Kanduth and Alberto Martino founder of the series Wiener Beiträge zu Komparatistik und Romanistik (Vienna Contributions to Comparative and Romance Studies) (Publisher: P. Lang, Frankfurt)
- Co-editor of the book series Internationale Forschungen zur Allgemeinen und Vergleichenden Literaturwissenschaft (Editions Rodopi, Amsterdam - Weidler Buchverlag, Berlin) and Translatio (Weidler Buchverlag, Berlin)
- 2012-18 Editor of Editionen in der Kritik (Weidler Buchverlag, Berlin)
- 2003-12 Member of the Commission for Music Research of the Austrian Academy of Sciences;
- Corresponding Member of the Accademia Galileiana in Padua (Italy)
- Member of the Scientific Advisory Board of the Giornale storico della letteratura italiana
- With Hans-Gert Roloff founder of the working group on the transformative reception of literary traditions in the Early Modern Period
- With Hans-Gert Roloff editor of the complete works by Johann Rist
- With Christine Noe editor of the neolatin poetry by Nicodemus Frischlin.
- Director of research projects and editor of the complete dramatic works by Apostolo Zeno
- President of the Società Dante Alighieri, Vienna

== Honors and awards ==
- 2012 Flaiano prize
- 2011 Commendatore of the Order of Merit of the Italian Republic
- 2002 Officer of the Ordre des Palmes académiques

== Publications ==
- Publication list of Alfred Noe at the University of Vienna

Noe is the author of monographs, articles in scientific journals and editor of miscellanies on literary and didactic topics.
