= Trans-Mo Airlines =

Regional airline of the United States

Trans-Mo Airlines was a regional airline and air taxi operator from 1966 (60 years ago) until 1983 (43 years ago) and based at Memorial Airport in Jefferson City, Missouri. The airline used Cessna 402 aircraft and published timetables from 1968 to 1983.

== Destinations ==
As of 1979, Trans-Mo served the following destinations:

- Jefferson City, Missouri
- Kansas City, Missouri
- Lake of the Ozarks
- Sedalia, Missouri
- St. Louis, Missouri

Trans-Mo also served Topeka, Kansas during the late 1960s.

== See also ==
- List of defunct airlines of the United States
