= Billiard =

Billiard or billiards may refer to:

== Cue sports ==
- A billiard, a type of shot in cue sports (see below)
- Billiards: cue sports in general; the term "billiards" by itself is also sometimes used to refer to any of the following more specifically:
  - Carom billiards (also known as French billiards), games in general (a chiefly non-British usage)
  - Three-cushion billiards, even more specifically, the most popular form of carom billiards worldwide
  - The specific game of English billiards (a chiefly British, Irish and Australian usage)
  - Pool (cue sports) (pocket billiards) games, such as eight-ball and nine-ball, in general (a chiefly colloquial North American usage)
- See the list of cue sports for various other games with "billiards" in their names; also more specifically:
  - Pin billiards, a fairly large number of billiard games that use a pin, or a set of pins or "skittles"
  - Bar billiards, a game combining elements of bagatelle and English billiards
- Electric billiards, an obsolete term for pinball
- Billiard table: The bounded table on which cue sports are played

== Lawn sports ==
- Ground billiards
- Lawn billiards

== Mathematics and physics ==
- Billiard (number), the long-scale name used in most European languages for the number 10^{15} (called quadrillion in the short scale generally used in English)
- Dynamical billiards, the mathematical theory of particle trajectories within a closed reflective boundary

== People ==
- Cora Billiard Wickham Sibley (née Billiard, 1884–1976), American painter, and wife of Robert Pelton Sibley
- Harry Billiard (1883–1923), Major League Baseball pitcher
- Maria Duchêne-Billiard (1884–?), French contralto of the Metropolitan Opera

== See also ==
- Billiards World Cup Association, a governing body for carom billiards
- Billard (disambiguation)
