= Ordre des Palmes académiques =

National order bestowed by the French Republic

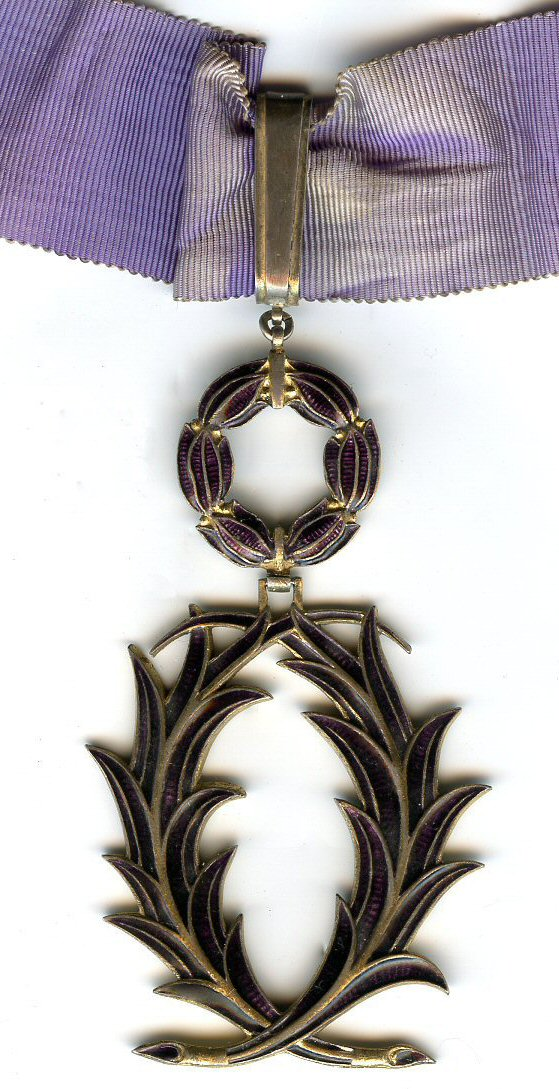
- Commander's neck badge and ribbon

Awarded by Ministry of National Education of the French Republic
- Type: Order of merit
- Established: Decoration: 1808; Order: 1955
- Awarded for: Distinguished contributions to education or culture
- Status: Currently constituted
- Grand Master: Emmanuel Macron (President of France)
- Chancellor: Pap Ndiaye, Minister of National Education
- Grades: Commander, 1st Class; Officer, 2nd Class; Member/Knight, 3rd Class

Precedence
- Next (higher): Médaille de la Résistance
- Next (lower): Order of Agricultural Merit
- Commander; Officer; Knight; The three graded ribbon bars of the Order

The Ordre des Palmes académiques (French pronunciation: [ɔʁdʁ de palm(z‿)akademik]; French for 'Order of Academic Palms') is a national order bestowed by the French Republic on distinguished academics and teachers and for valuable service to universities, education and science.

Originally established in 1808 by Emperor of the French Napoleon as a decoration to honour eminent members of the University of Paris, it was changed into its current form as an order of merit on 4 October 1955 by President René Coty, making it one of the oldest civil honours bestowed by the French Republic.

== History ==
=== Decoration (1808–1955) ===
The original Palmes académiques was instituted by Napoleon on 17 March 1808. In this sense, it shares its origins with the Legion of Honour which Napoleon had established shortly before. Palmes académiques was established to decorate people associated with the university, including high schools (lycées). It was not an order as such, but a title of honour identifiable by its insignia sewn on the recipients' costumes. It was bestowed only upon teachers or professors. The original decoration included three classes:

- Titulaire – gold palm sewn on white silk;
- Officier l'Université – silver palm sewn on white silk;
- Officier d'Académie – blue palm sewn on white silk.

The Titulaires were limited to the grand masters of the university, chancellors, treasurers, and councilors for life. The Officiers de l'Université were ordinary councilors, university inspectors, rectors, academy inspectors, deans and faculty professors. The Officiers d'Académie were headmasters, censors, teachers of the two most distinguished classes of high schools, principals of colleges, and, in exceptional cases, high school teachers or college regents. Those working in primary education were ineligible.

On 9 October 1850, the number of classes was reduced to two:

- Officier de l'Instruction Publique (Golden Palms);
- Officier d'Académie (Silver Palms).

Only those working in education for at least 15 years were eligible. The decoration was conferred by the Minister of Public Instruction on the proposal of rectors after having consulted academic councils.

In 1866, Napoleon III, prompted by Minister of Public Instruction Victor Duruy, widened the scope of the award to include non-teaching persons who had otherwise made contributions to education and culture, including foreigners. It was also made available to French expatriates who made major contributions to learning or education in the wider world.

=== Order (1955–today) ===
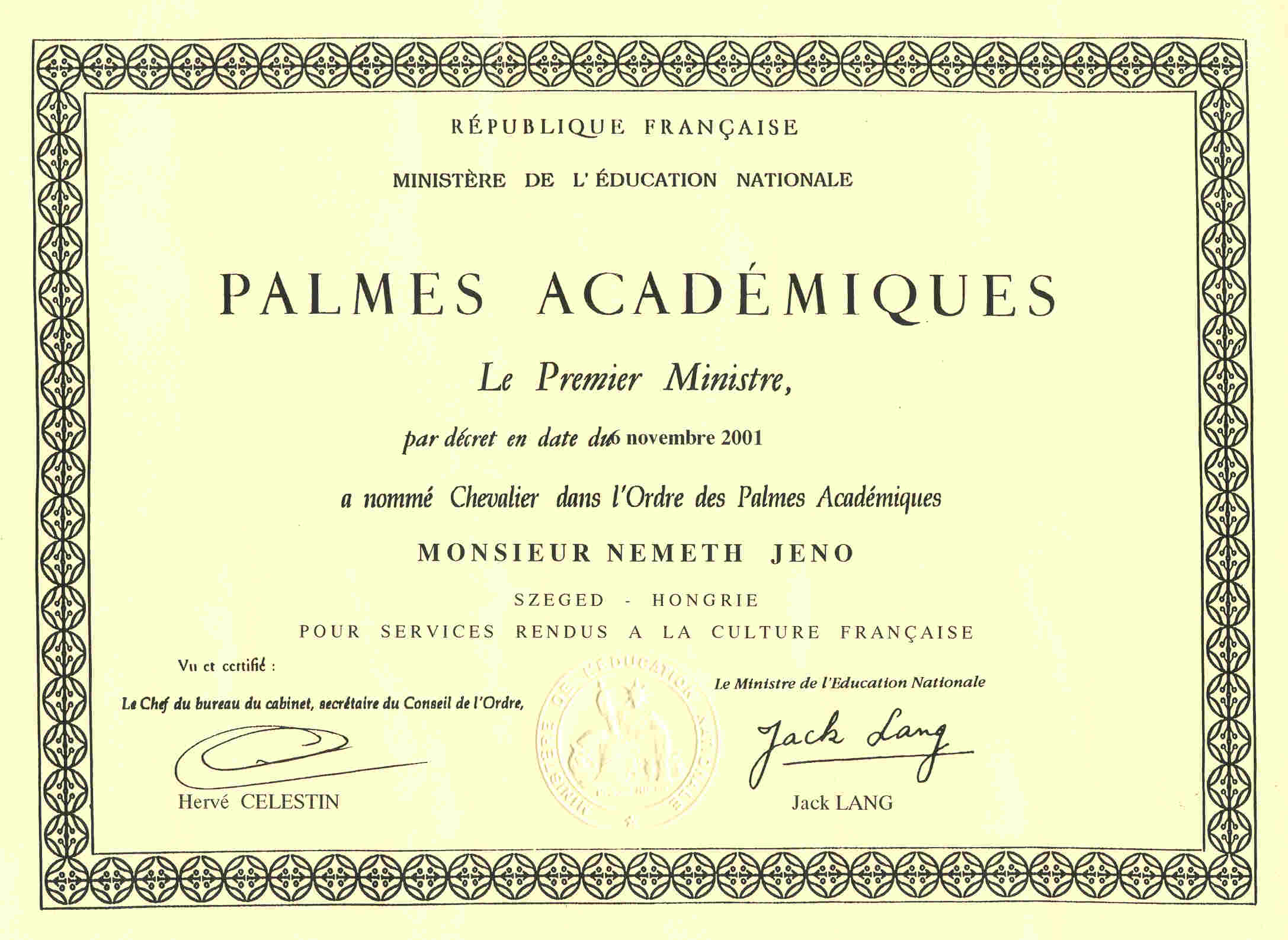
Certificate of Ordre des Palmes académiques

The present Ordre des Palmes académiques was instituted on 4 October 1955 by President René Coty. In 1963 the French system of orders was reformed under President Charles de Gaulle. A number of so-called "ministerial orders" were consolidated into the Ordre national du Mérite. De Gaulle, however, was fond of the Ordre des Palmes académiques and decided to keep it as a separate order. Since 1955, the Ordre des Palmes académiques has had three grades, each with a fixed annual number of new recipients or promotions:

- Commander (Commandeur) – gold palm of 60 mm surmounted by a laurel wreath (couronne) worn on necklet, limited to 280 annually;
- Officer (Officier) – gold palm of 55 mm worn on ribbon with rosette on left breast, limited to 1523 annually;
- Knight (Chevalier) – silver palm of 50 mm worn on ribbon on left breast, limited to 4547 annually.

The order is conferred for services to the universities, in teaching or in scientific work. It can be conferred on both French citizens, including those residing abroad, and foreigners. The minimum age of conferment is 35 years. Promotion to a higher grade usually requires five years in the lower rank. The order is administered by a council whose president is the Minister of National Education. Decisions on nominations and promotions are proposed by the minister and formally decided by the Prime Minister. Decisions are announced annually on 1 January, New Year's Day and 14 July, Bastille Day. For those not connected to state-sponsored public education, or the Ministry of National Education, the announcements are made on New Year's Day and for all others on Bastille Day. In 2018, the annual quotas were cut by almost half to their present level.

== Notable recipients ==
=== French recipients ===
- Monique Adolphe
- Michel Alaux
- Pierre Arpaillange
- Lucie Aubrac
- Charline Avenel
- Marcel Barrére
- Jules Benoit-Lévy
- Edith Bernardin
- Henri Betti
- Juliette Billard
- Françoise Blime-Dutertre
- Isabelle Bogelot
- Dounia Bouzar
- Alexandre Bouzdine
- Henri Brocard
- Colette Caillat
- Bernard Claverie
- Jean-Claude Ferrage
- Flavien Collet
- Yves Coppens
- Patrick Cousot
- Jean Delaire
- Émilie Desjeux
- Erwan Dianteill
- Serge Dumont
- Ferdinand Foch
- Claire Gibault
- Patrick Louis
- Najla Hawly
- Germain Marc'hadour
- Hélène Miard-Delacroix
- Subrata K. Mitra
- Marcel Pagnol
- Augusta Polifeme
- Édouard Pottier
- Pierre Roualet
- Pierre Louis Rouillard
- Henri Rousseau (In error 1904, page 4)
- Alice Saunier-Seité
- Roger Taillibert
- Pauline Thys
- Henriette Tirman
- Arlette Vassy
- François Weigel
- Marie-Pier Ysser
- Pascal Divanach
- Philippe Zawieja

=== Foreign recipients ===
- Aram Barlezizyan, Professor Emeritus Aram Barlézizian at the Yerevan State Linguistic University after V. Brusov. Armenia
- Guy Bennett, American writer and translator, Professor at Otis College of Art and Design
- Bruno Bernard, Belgian professor and writer on export and business ethics
- Roméo Bosetti, Italian-born silent film director and actor.
- Louis Dewis, born Isidore Louis Dewachter in Belgium. Merchant and later a post-impressionist painter, he was honoured for his civic endeavors in the early 1900s
- Edith Dumont, Lieutenant Governor of Ontario
- Ahmed H. Fahal (2017), Professor of Surgery at the University of Khartoum, who especially in Mycetoma.
- Allan L. Goldstein, American biochemist and co-discoverer of the Thymosins
- Mary Riter Hamilton, Canada's first female battlefield artist
- Michael Hawcroft, Associate Professor of French at the University of Oxford, a specialist in Racine and Molière. Notable former students include L. Inglesfield and Geoffrey Roberts.
- Ralph M. Hester, Professor of French, Stanford University, co-author of Découverte et Création, the most widely used textbook for teaching French in the United States in the 1970s and 1980s.
- A. Majeed Khan, Bangladeshi educator for education, science and culture.
- Jihane Kasshanna, Lebanese founder of the SFELK French school in Northern Nigeria, the only one of its kind in the region
- James A. Kilker, Southern Illinois professor Emeritus, a specialist in French civilization, Kilker was known for his courses on French influence in the Mississippi Valley, which included tours of historic sites at St. Louis, and the Southern Illinois communities of Kaskaskia and Prairie Du Rocher.
- John Kneller, English-American professor and fifth President of Brooklyn College
- Abdon Laus, Algerian-American bassoonist and saxophonist, principal bassoon of Boston Symphony Orchestra, played noted bassoon solo at the premiere of Igor Stravinsky's Rite of Spring
- Francis L. Lawrence, American educator and scholar specializing in French literature; classical drama and baroque poetry, President of Rutgers University 1990–2002
- Alice Lemieux-Lévesque, Canadian-American writer
- Ahmad Kamyabi Mask, Iranian littérateur, writer, translator, publisher and Professor Emeritus of Modern Drama and Theater of the Faculty of Fine Arts of the University of Tehran
- Alfred Noe, Austrian historian of Romance studies
- Marija Rus, Slovenian Romance philologist, professor of French, translator and poet
- Zeus Salazar, Filipino Historian
- Queen 'Masenate Mohato Seeiso of Lesotho (2018)
- Léopold Sédar Senghor, Senegalese poet, theoretician of Négritude, first President of Senegal (1960–80)
- Ali-Akbar Siassi, Iranian intellectual and psychologist who served as the country's Foreign Minister, Minister of Education and Chancellor of the University of Tehran.
- Lucijan Marija Škerjanc, Slovene composer, conductor, pianist and musicologist
- Javad Tabatabai, Iranian philosopher and political scientist, Professor and Vice-Dean of the Faculty of Law and Political Science at the University of Tehran
- Marek Tamm, Estonian medievalist historian at Tallinn University
- Buddy Wentworth, Namibian deputy education minister, for his contributions to the Namibian independence struggle
- Kathryn (Katy) Sheely Wheelock, American educator of the French language, Executive Council Regional Representative & Vice President of the American Association of Teachers of French (2017-2024), founder of Vive
- Frank White, L.L.D., 8th Governor of North Dakota and 25th Treasurer of the United States.
- Tengku Zatashah, princess of Selangor and the president of Alliance Française de Kuala Lumpur.
- Shi Zhengli, virologist and Director of the Center for Emerging Infectious Diseases, Wuhan Institute of Virology, Chinese Academy of Sciences.

== Insignia ==
The badge, unchanged since its creation in 1808, consists of a pair of violet-enamelled palm branches. It is suspended from a plain violet ribbon.

Member/Knight (Chevalier)	Officer (Officier)	Commander (Commandeur)
