= Philippe Zawieja =

French psychosociologist and essayist

- Education: Burgundy School of Business; Paris School of Medicine (M.A.); Mines ParisTech (Ph.D.)
- Awards: Ordre des Palmes académiques
- Scientific career
- Fields: Psychosociology, fatigue studies, health care, Alzheimer's
- Workplaces: Mines ParisTech; Orpea

Philippe Zawieja is a French psychosociologist, essayist and researcher in psychological occupational health at Mines ParisTech, Paris, known for his research on occupational burnout and other forms of fatigue, in particular in health care industry and Alzheimer's care.

== Biography ==
Zawieja graduated from Burgundy School of Business in 1991, and obtained a master's degree in health economics and management from Paris School of Medicine and a Ph.D. in science and engineering of at-risk activities from Mines ParisTech. Till 2020, he also served as Secretary of the International Scientific and Ethics Council of Orpea, the European leader in dependency care.

== Awards and honors ==
Zawieja was nominated in 2013 Knight of the Ordre des Palmes académiques (Order of Academic Palms), a French Order of Chivalry for distinguished academics and figures in the world of culture and education.

He was granted in 2014 the René-Joseph Laufer Award for social preventive health by the Académie des Sciences Morales et Politiques (French Academy of Moral and Political Sciences), part of the Institut de France.

== Selected publications ==
- Cabral M., Zawieja P., Almeida J.D. & Outeirinho M.F., edrs. Lectures de la fatigue : entre pathologisation, critique sociale et création. Paris : Le Manuscrit, March 2023. ISBN 978-2-304-05462-0
- Zawieja P., Marmion J.F. & Mlle Caroline. Les Rescapés du burnout. Paris (France) : Les Arènes, February 2023. ISBN 979-10-375-0847-8
- Zawieja P., edr. Psychotraumatologie du travail. Paris (France): Armand Colin, November 2016. ISBN 978-2200611958
- Zawieja P., edr. Dictionnaire de la fatigue. Geneva (Switzerland): Droz, September 2016. ISBN 978-2600047135
- Zawieja P. Le burn out. Paris (France): Presses universitaires de France, April 2015 (2nd Ed. 2022). ISBN 9782130633563
- Zawieja P, Guarnieri F, eds. Dictionnaire des risques psychosociaux. Paris (France): Le Seuil, February 2014. ISBN 9782021109221
- Zawieja P, Guarnieri F, eds. Épuisement professionnel : approches innovantes et pluridisciplinaires. Paris (France): Armand Colin, September 2013. ISBN 978-2200287726
