= Aude Billard =

Swiss physicist

Aude Gemma Billard
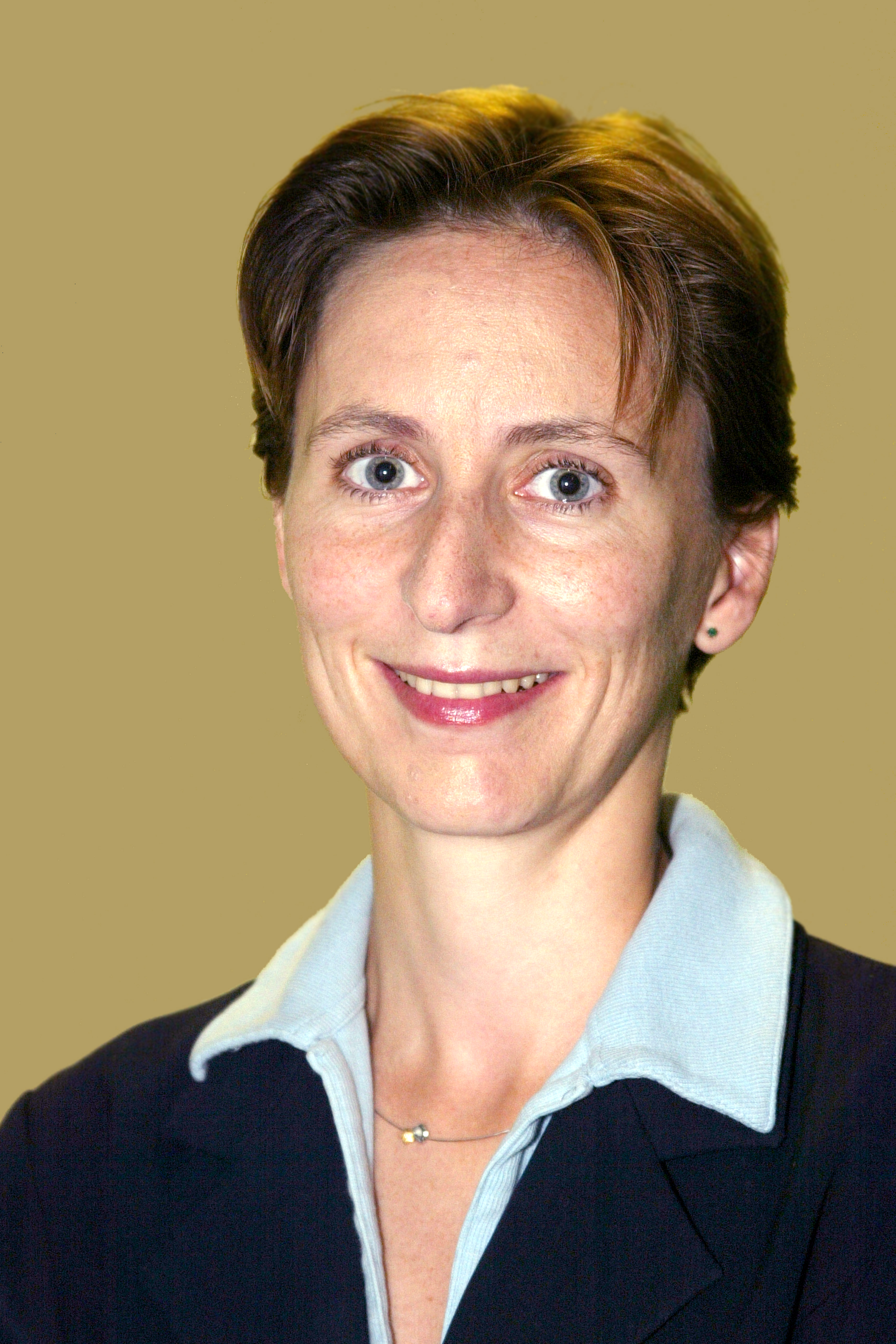
- Portrait
- Born: 1971 (age 54–55); Lausanne, Switzerland
- Education: B.S. and M.S. École Polytechnique Fédérale de Lausanne (EPFL), M.S. and Ph.D. University of Edinburgh
- Known for: Applying machine learning to robotics to improve learning and task performance
- Awards: 2016 Nominated as Member of SATW, Swiss Academy of Engineering Sciences, 2016 Nominated for Outstanding Women in Academics SNSF, 2015 King-Sun Fu Best Transactions Paper Award, IEEE & Robotics and Automation Society, 2003 The Outstanding Young Person in Science and Innovation, Junior Chamber of Commerce, 2002 SNF Professeur Boursier, Career Award from Swiss National Science Foundation, 2001 Innovative Teaching Grant - Intel Corporation, 1999 Fellowship Medicus Foundation, 1996-97 Scholarship, Swiss National Science Foundation
- Scientific career
- Fields: Machine learning, robotics, physics
- Workplaces: École Polytechnique Fédérale de Lausanne (EPFL)
- Website: http://lasa.epfl.ch/

Aude G. Billard (born c. August 6, 1971) is a Swiss physicist in the fields of machine learning and human-robot interactions. As a full professor at the School of Engineering at Swiss Federal Institute of Technology in Lausanne (EPFL), Billard's research focuses on applying machine learning to support robot learning through human guidance. Billard's work on human-robot interactions has been recognized numerous times by the Institute of Electrical and Electronics Engineers (IEEE) and she currently holds a leadership position on the executive committee of the IEEE Robotics and Automation Society (RAS) as the vice president of publication activities.

== Early life and education ==
Billard was born in Lausanne, Switzerland, on August 6, 1971. She stayed in Switzerland and pursued a Bachelor of Science in physics at the Swiss Federal Institute of Technology at Lausanne (EPFL). After graduating in 1994, Billard stayed at EPFL for one more year to complete her Master of Science in physics. During her time at EPFL, she specialized in Particle Physics and conducted research at the European Center for Nuclear Research (CERN).

After completing her degrees at EPFL, Billard pursued further education at the University of Edinburgh in the Department of Artificial Intelligence. Billard first completed another Master of Science in 1996, this time in knowledge based systems, and then continued at the University of Edinburgh completing her PhD in artificial intelligence.

Billard completed her PhD in 1998 and then moved back to Switzerland to pursue her postdoctoral studies at EPFL and The Swiss Artificial Intelligence Lab (IDSIA or Instituto Dalle Molle di Syudi sull'Intelligenza Artificiale) until 1999.

=== Imitative learning in social robots ===
During her master's degree at the University of Edinburgh, Billard focused on learning how to build Knowledge-Based Systems, essentially computer programs that are built on fundamental frames, concepts, and logical assertions from the real world but with the ability to perform inferences and derive new knowledge through reasoning systems. Billard's Master's thesis, titled "Allo Kazam, do You Follow Me? or Learning to Speak Through Imitation for Social Robots", focused on the goal of building a system that could develop communication abilities. She developed a system that was capable of learning simple syntactical language and she used two mobile and autonomous robots, acting as teacher and student, to implement the architecture. With an emphasis on simplicity and generalizability, Billard was able to ensure that neither specificities about the environment nor the particular robotic agent were necessary for success of the architecture in practice.

During her graduate work, Billard continued to use the teacher-learner situation as an environment with which to develop robots with social communication abilities. Billard tested her novel learning architecture and found that learning through imitation can be achieved with simple computations and a photodetection system between the teacher and the learner to impart information about movement. However, Billard mentioned in her thesis there are still limitations to learning capabilities when the only means of learning is by imitation. Billard suggested that social learning could be enhanced with more complex cognitive mechanisms that enable a robot to associate one outcome with a subsequent event instead of with simultaneous sensory.

=== Dynamical - Recurrent - Associative - Memory - Architecture ===
In Billard's graduate thesis, she described her work implementing imitation learning in autonomous robots through applying her innovative connectionist model designed for robot learning called DRAMA (Dynamical – Recurrent – Associative – Memory – Architecture). To develop DRAMA, Billard used an anti-objectivist framework, distinguishing between cognitive and behavioral skills. This framework ensures that the behavior of one robot takes into account its previous interactions, since behaviors are performed in relation to the social environment with which the robot exists. The framework also takes into account the internal state of the robot, essentially the computations representing the robots own actions. She uses this model in various scenarios in which a human or a robot is the instructor teaching a student robot to build symbolic representations of the world, learn a synthetic proto-language, or perform specific imitative movements.

During her brief postdoctoral work back at EPFL, Billard proposes a theoretical framework with which to understand multi-robot communication systems. She probabilistically modelled a multi-robot system and found that her model was able to accurately predict the ability of the system to process dynamic environmental information and apply it to communication and task learning among other robots.

== Career and research ==
In 1999, Billard was appointed research associate in the computer science department at the University of Southern California. The following year, she was promoted to research assistant professor, a title she held until 2002. She was then appointed to adjunct professor at USC as well as assistant professor of the School of Engineering at EPFL. While maintaining her adjunct professorship at USC, Billard was continually promoted at EPFL. In 2005, Billard was promoted to associate professor with tenure, and then in 2013 she was promoted to full professor of the School of Engineering at EPFL. Her research and laboratory work have focused on using machine learning to control and design robotic systems meant to interact with humans. Her laboratory at EPFL is called the Learning Algorithms and Systems Laboratory (LASA), which started in 2006, and is widely known for training robots to perform skills with the level of dexterity of a human. The main facets of research her laboratory currently explores are: human-robot interaction, machine learning with applications to robotics, fast adaptive control, dexterous manipulations and grasping, as well as computational neuroscience and cognitive modelling. All of their research works towards developing robotic systems that are able to adapt to fast changes, interact with humans and other robots in a humanistic way, and learn from teachers as well as from previous experiences.

Billard is an active member of both the local and international research communities she is a part of. Billard is the elected president of the EPFL Teaching Body Assembly, elected president of the EPFL Teachers' Council, a member of the Swiss Science and technology Council, the Swiss Academy of Engineering Sciences, a Fellow of the computer science department at the University of Hertfordshire, a senior editor of the IEEE Transactions in Robotics, a member of the advisory board of Ecole des Mines & Telecommunication in Paris, and the associate editor of the International Journal of Social Robotics.

Her leadership within the IEEE is longstanding as she served as an elected member of the administrative committee of the IEEE Robotics and Automation Society for two terms, from 2006 to 2011, and is currently the chair of the IEEE Robotics and Automation Society Technical Committee on Humanoid Robotics. From 2013 to 2014 she served as the associate editor of the IEEE Transactions in Robotics and she was the industry forum chair for the IEEE Robotics and Automation Society Committee in 2015.

=== Improvements to imitation learning in social robots ===
In 2001, Billard proposed a biologically plausible model of human imitation and discussed its applicability in robot teaching. The model was able to learn the principal features of an arm trajectory in a throwing/catching imitation task, was able to generalize across different demonstrations, was able to learn on-line, and its movements were robust to perturbations. Billard continued to explore more biologically inspired connectionist architectures with which to train robots to learn complex arm movements by imitation. She based her artificial neural networks on brain regions such as the visual and motor cortices and incorporated a decision making occurs region as well. This allowed Billard's model to imitate a teacher just as well as a human subject would imitate in the same task. Billard continues to base her computational approaches on biological systems and began to explore how implementing neuromodulatory mechanisms in neural networks produce tune-able pattern generation as they would in the human brain. Further, Billard and her colleagues began to implement neurobiological concepts such as homeostatic plasticity, Hebbian reinforcement learning, and hormone feedback into their neural networks to again provide adaptability and flexibility like that exists in the human brain.

In 2006, Billard began adding social cues to interactions between humanoid robots to improve the ability of humanoids to switch between learning and reproduction phases in an imitation framework. She found that implementing a gesture recognition system and using motion sensors, as well as a Hidden Markov Model to extract the essential components of the social cues, produced more life-like behaviors in a social learning task.

=== Modelling fast adaptive control and dexterity to enable skill acquisition in robots ===
Using biologically inspired robotic models, Billard has been able to improve the ability of robots to learn precise and complex motor skills. From 2008 on, Billard highlighted the power of dynamical systems in controlling fine robot movements and generalizing those movements within different contexts. Billard and her team used golf putting as a task to explore the ability of the robot to learn complex motions and adapt to changes in position, speed, and target location. When they allowed the robot to learn from the failed attempts at putting the golf ball into the hole, just as a human would learn from failure, the robot began to perform better as it gained information regarding the precise speed patterns and orientations from both successful and failed attempts at sinking a put. Shortly after Billard published these astonishing results of the motor learning capabilities of robots, she showed that she could also teach robots to catch objects in flight. The video of their robot catching objects in flight has been viewed millions of times on YouTube and their publication in IEEE was the most frequently downloaded document in the journal.

In 2015, Billard and her colleagues used electromyographic EMG recordings to decode grasping intentions at early stages of grasping, as these stages are important for early estimation of final hand position and generation of smooth gestures. With 90% accuracy, they were able to decode three typical grasps, which provides a novel and effective approach to coordinating a subjects arm movements with a robotic hand to generate a natural pattern of motion.

In 2016, Billard and her students won multiple awards for their paper 'Coordinated multi-arm motion planning: Reaching for moving objects in the face of uncertainty'. In this work, Billard and her students proposed a virtual object based dynamical systems control law that could generate autonomous and synchronized movements for a multi-arm robotic system. They were able to validate their approach using a dual-arm robotic system and they found that it was able to adapt and coordinate the motion of each arm to catch flying objects at high speeds and with uncertainty in trajectory.

Billard and her team have also implemented hierarchical knowledge systems to allow robots to learn both high-level complex task plans as well as lower level movements after demonstrations. Their work in 2016 showed that by combining a variant of a Hidden Markov Model with an algorithm that outputs transition probabilities, they were able to learn both low-level motor patterns during specific behaviors as well as the probability of a transition to the next behavior in the sequence. Billard and her colleagues further improved robotic learning of task sequences publishing their methods in the Proceedings of Machine Learning Research in 2017. They combined linear parameter varying systems, to enable the learning of task sequences, with hidden Markov Models, to learn complex control policies of each subgoal/subtask, and were able to validate their approach using two different human demonstrations.

=== Dynamical systems approach to physical human-robot interactions ===
In 2018, Billard and her colleagues developed a method to teach robots to modify their tasks based on human physical interactions and interference. By updating the parameters of their dynamical system to account for desired trajectory versus trajectory of the human interference, they were able to test their approach in real world experiments where robots successfully learned how to adjust their movements in relation to human interactions.

== Awards and honors ==
- (2017) European Research Council Advanced Grant for Skill Acquisition in Humans and Robots
- (2016) Nominated as Member of SATW, Swiss Academy of Engineering Sciences
- (2016) Nominated for Outstanding Women in Academics, SNSF, AcademiaNet
- (2016) Best Student Paper Award, RSS
- (2015) King-Sun Fu Best Transactions Paper Award, IEEE & Robotics and Automation Society
- (2013) Best reviewer award for the IEEE Robotics and Automation Society
- (2012) Best Cognitive Robotics Paper Award, Int. Conf. on Robotics and Automation (ICRA)
- (2011) JTSC Novel Technology Best Paper Award, IEEE Int. Conf. Intelligent & Robotics Systems (IROS)
- (2011) Nominated for Best Paper Award, Neural Information Processing Symposium
- (2007) Nominated for Best Paper Award, IEEE Int. Conf. on Humanoid Robots
- (2004) Best Paper Award, Workshop on Universal Access and Assistive Technology (CWUATT)
- (2003)The Outstanding Young Person in Science and Innovation, Junior Chamber of Commerce, Switzerland
- (2002) SNF Professeur Boursier, Career Award from Swiss National Science Foundation
- (2001) Innovative Teaching Grant, Intel Corporation
- (1999) Fellowship, Medicus Foundation, New York, USA
- (1996–97) Scholarship, Swiss National Science Foundation, Switzerland

== Selected publications ==
- Aude Gemma Billard. 2016. Towards Reproducing Humans? Exquisite Dexterity and Reactivity. In The Eleventh ACM/IEEE International Conference on Human Robot Interaction (HRI '16). IEEE Press, 99.
- Nadia Figueroa, Ana Lucia Pais Ureche, and Aude Billard. 2016. Learning Complex Sequential Tasks from Demonstration: A Pizza Dough Rolling Case Study. In The Eleventh ACM/IEEE International Conference on Human Robot Interaction (HRI '16). IEEE Press, 611–612.
- Ana-Lucia Pais Ureche and Aude Billard. 2015. Learning Bimanual Coordinated Tasks From Human Demonstrations. In Proceedings of the Tenth Annual ACM/IEEE International Conference on Human-Robot Interaction Extended Abstracts (HRI'15 Extended Abstracts). Association for Computing Machinery, New York, NY, USA, 141–142. DOI:https://doi.org/10.1145/2701973.2702007
- Iason Batzianoulis, Sahar El-Khoury, Silvestro Micera, and Aude Billard. 2015. EMG-Based Analysis of the Upper Limb Motion. In Proceedings of the Tenth Annual ACM/IEEE International Conference on Human-Robot Interaction Extended Abstracts (HRI'15 Extended Abstracts). Association for Computing Machinery, New York, NY, USA, 49–50. DOI:https://doi.org/10.1145/2701973.2701997
- Daniel H. Grollman and Aude G. Billard. 2011. Learning from failure: extended abstract. In Proceedings of the 6th international conference on Human-robot interaction (HRI '11). Association for Computing Machinery, New York, NY, USA, 145–146. DOI:https://doi.org/10.1145/1957656.1957703
- Eric Sauser, Brenna Argall, and Aude Billard. 2011. The life of icub, a little humanoid robot learning from humans through tactile sensing. In Proceedings of the 6th international conference on Human-robot interaction (HRI '11). Association for Computing Machinery, New York, NY, USA, 393–394. DOI:https://doi.org/10.1145/1957656.1957798
- Elena Gribovskaya and Aude Billard. 2008. Combining dynamical systems control and programming by demonstration for teaching discrete bimanual coordination tasks to a humanoid robot. In Proceedings of the 3rd ACM/IEEE international conference on Human robot interaction (HRI '08). Association for Computing Machinery, New York, NY, USA, 33–40. DOI:https://doi.org/10.1145/1349822.1349828
- Sylvain Calinon and Aude Billard. 2007. Incremental learning of gestures by imitation in a humanoid robot. In Proceedings of the ACM/IEEE international conference on Human-robot interaction (HRI '07). Association for Computing Machinery, New York, NY, USA, 255–262. DOI:https://doi.org/10.1145/1228716.1228751
- Sylvain Calinon and Aude Billard. 2005. Recognition and reproduction of gestures using a probabilistic framework combining PCA, ICA and HMM. In Proceedings of the 22nd international conference on Machine learning (ICML '05). Association for Computing Machinery, New York, NY, USA, 105–112. DOI:https://doi.org/10.1145/1102351.1102365
- Aude Billard and Maja J. Matarić. 2000. A biologically inspired robotic model for learning by imitation. In Proceedings of the fourth international conference on Autonomous agents (AGENTS '00). Association for Computing Machinery, New York, NY, USA, 373–380. DOI:https://doi.org/10.1145/336595.337544
- Kerstin Dautenhahn and Aude Billard. 1999. Bringing up robots or—the psychology of socially intelligent robots: from theory to implementation. In Proceedings of the third annual conference on Autonomous Agents (AGENTS '99). Association for Computing Machinery, New York, NY, USA, 366–367. DOI:https://doi.org/10.1145/301136.301237

== Political career ==
A member of the Social Democratic Party of Switzerland, Billard was elected in 2022 to the Grand Council of Vaud as a representative for the Lausanne-Ville district.

== Personal life ==
Billard is the mother of three girls.
