= Claude Billard =

French writer, poet and playwright

Claude Billard (Souvigny, 1550 – Courgenay, 1618) was a French writer, poet and playwright of the Renaissance.

== Biography ==
Raised by the Duchess of Retz, whom he would name "generous Dictynne" in his verse, he was first a soldier and fought alongside the Catholics during the French Wars of Religion. He wrote a lament on the death of the Duke of Joyeuse in 1587 and from 1588 would publish verse, acknowledging his masters were Jodelle, Robert Garnier and Ronsard. He became advisor then secretary to Queen Margaret of Valois. He then turned to theater and was one of the first to take his subjects from the history of France. He brought together seven tragedies in a collection published in 1610. That same year, the assassination of Henri IV provided him the theme for a play which was presented before the Queen Marie de' Medici. He ended his life in his retirement at Courgenay.

== Works ==
- 1587: Vers funèbres françois et latins sur le vrai discours de la mort de M. le duc de Joyeuse, 1587
- 1605: Voyage de la reine Marguerite en sa maison de Bologne
- 1607: Polixène
- 1607: Gaston de Foix
- 1607: Mérovée
- 1608: Panthée
- 1608: Saül
- 1609: Alboin
- 1609: Genèvre

(These seven tragedies were gathered in a collection entitled Tragédies françoises, D. Langlois, 1610)

- 1610: Henri le Grand

=== Recent edition ===
Genevre, a cura di Giovanna Melis, Cagliari, Università degli studi di Cagliari, Istituto di lingue e letterature straniere, 1983

== Bibliography ==
- Lancaster Eugene Dabney, Claude Billard : Minor French Dramatist of the Seventeenth Century, Johns Hopkins Studies in Romance Literature and Languages, vol. 19, Baltimore, 1931
- Eugène Rigal, Le Théâtre français avant la période classique, Hachette, 1901
- François et Claude Parfaict, Pierre-Gilles Le Mercier, Histoire du théâtre françois depuis son origine jusqu'à présent, t. IV, 1745
