= Juliette Billard =

French architect, watercolorist and designer

- Born: 17 February 1889; Rouen, France
- Died: 7 October 1975 (aged 86); Rouen, France
- Burial place: Northern Cemetery
- Education: Rouen School of Fine Arts; National School of Fine Arts
- Occupations: Architect, painter, designer

Juliette Billard (born 17 February 1889 in Rouen and died there 7 October 1975) was a French architect, watercolorist and designer. In 1914, she became the first woman admitted to the National School of Fine Arts.

== Life and work ==
Juliette Billard was born in Rouen, France, on rue Socrate, to the painter Rubens Hippolyte and the seamstress Joséphine Victoire Queval. She took courses at the Rouen School of Fine Arts under the direction of Victorien Lelong, Georges Ruel and Philippe Zacharie. She was the first woman to be admitted to the National School of Fine Arts in 1914 and graduated in 1920–1921. After the First World War, she took part in the competition for the creation of the Rouen war memorial. Her project was not selected but she received Third Prize. From 1928 to 1932, she worked in the office of architect Pierre Chirol.

Roger Goupillières hired her as a decorator at the Société des Cinéromans at the Joinville Studios where she created the sets for the films L'Ouest, L'Argent in 1928 by Marcel L'Herbier, and Figaro in 1929.

Billard participated in drawing exhibitions in Rouen in 1932 and 1937, as well as in exhibitions of the Society of Rouen Artists and the Norman Society of Applied Arts.

Thanks to her relationships with the publisher Pierre-René Wolf and the director of the municipal library Henri Labrosse, she was finally able to make a living from her art. She became a decorator for the city of Rouen and illustrated the city's guestbook from 1936 to 1969. Teacher at the Rouen School of Fine Arts from 1937 to 1954, students created panels and banners for the 5th centenary of the death of Joan of Arc in 1931.

In 1934, she was appointed an officer of the Ordre des Palmes académiques. She chaired the Aide Artistique, which was founded in 1937. Her work was exhibited at the Legrip Gallery in Rouen in June 1937.

She lived at number 75 rue d'Amiens in Rouen. Her work was shown at the exhibitions of the Society of Norman Artists in 1937 and 1950 and at the Salon of Norman Independent Artists in Rouen in 1966, 1967, 1969 and 1973.

Juliette Billard died on 7 October 1975 in Rouen at the Compassion retirement home on Rue d'école. She is buried in the city's Northern Cemetery.

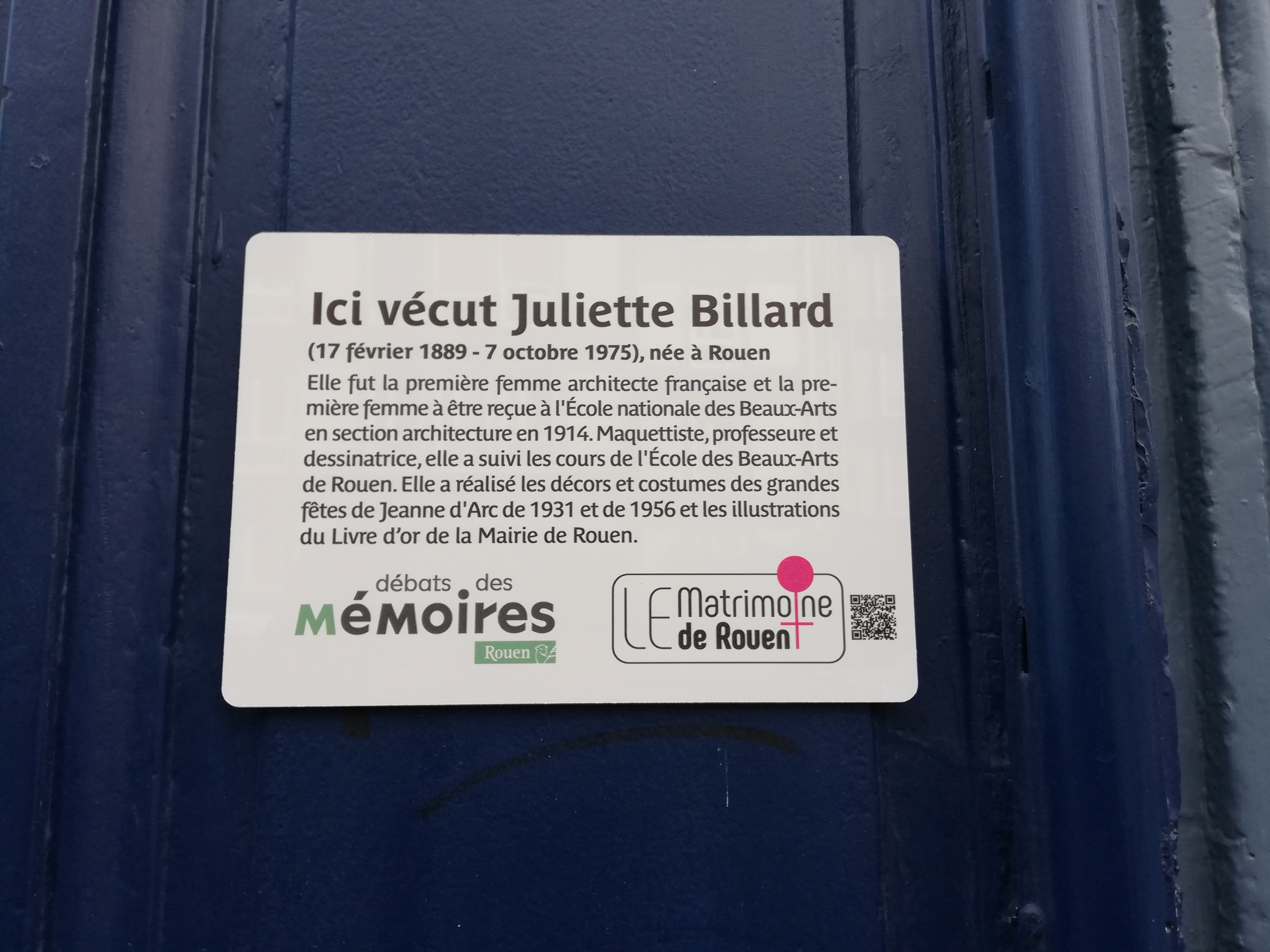
Plaque at her former home in Rouen, placed 2022.

== Tributes ==
- A place in Rouen bears her name at the crossroads of rue de Joyeuse and rue du Maulévrier, in accordance with a deliberation on 11 July 2016.
- A commemorative plaque was placed at her former home on 75 rue d'Amiens near the Rouen town hall on 19 November 2022.

== Distinctions ==
- Academy Officer (1934), Ordre des Palmes académiques. The medal was presented to her by Rouen mayor Georges Métayer.
