= Topeka Regional Airport =

Joint-use civil-military airport in Kansas, United States

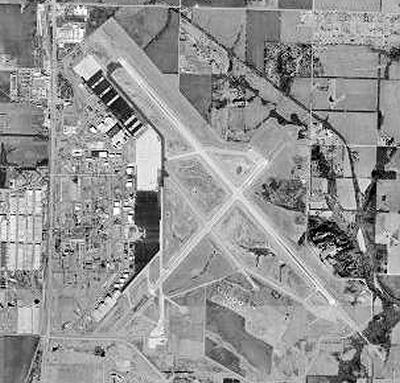
- USGS 2002 orthophoto
- IATA: FOE; ICAO: KFOE; FAA LID: FOE

Summary
- Airport type: Military/Public
- Owner: Metropolitan Topeka Airport Authority
- Serves: Topeka, Kansas
- Elevation AMSL: 1,078 ft (329 m)
- Coordinates: 38°57′03″N 95°39′49″W
- Website: http://www.mtaa-topeka.org

Maps
- FAA airport diagram
- Interactive map of Topeka Regional Airport

Runways
Direction	Length		Surface
Direction	ft	m	Surface
13/31	12,803	3,902	Concrete
3/21	7,001	2,134	Concrete

Statistics (2021)
- Aircraft operations (year ending 10/31/2021): 30,086
- Based aircraft: 33
- Source: Federal Aviation Administration

Topeka Regional Airport (IATA: FOE, ICAO: KFOE, FAA LID: FOE), formerly known as Forbes Field, is a joint civil-military public airport owned by the Metropolitan Topeka Airport Authority in Shawnee County, Kansas, seven miles south of downtown Topeka, the capital city of Kansas. The National Plan of Integrated Airport Systems for 2011–2015 called it a general aviation airport.

Topeka Regional Airport is used by the University of Kansas (KU) for charter flights for its athletic teams and by schools visiting the KU campus in Lawrence, which is 34 miles (55 km) east of the airport via the Kansas Turnpike. (Kansas City International Airport is 51 miles (82 km) from KU.) The airport had scheduled airline service by multiple carriers until 2014.

Federal Aviation Administration records say the airport had 11,573 passenger boardings (enplanements) in calendar year 2019.

== History ==
Topeka Regional Airport (formerly Forbes Field) is on the site of the Topeka Army Air Field, later Forbes Air Force Base, a former Strategic Air Command (SAC) facility that was transferred to Tactical Air Command in 1964 (while retaining SAC-gained tenants). Forbes AFB closed in 1973 but retained a USAF presence in the form of a SAC-gained Air National Guard installation that was previously a tenant command at Forbes AFB. With the departure of active duty Regular Air Force personnel and units, the remaining military activity was named Forbes Air National Guard Base.

Most of the former base administrative area is now used for offices and an industrial park. The 190th Air Refueling Wing (190 ARW) of the Kansas Air National Guard continues to part of the airport as a military cantonment area and Air National Guard installation known as Forbes Field Air National Guard Base; the wing currently flies and maintains the Boeing KC-135R Stratotanker.

From 1942 to 1973 the following Air Force components supervised the airfield:

- Second Air Force, 1942–1945
- Continental Air Forces, 1945–1947
- Air Materiel Command, 1947–1948; 1949–1951 (In inactive status)
- Strategic Air Command, 1948–1949; 1951–1964
- Tactical Air Command, 1964–1973
- Air National Guard, 1973 – present

In April 1976, except for areas retained by the Air National Guard, most of the former Forbes Air Force Base was turned over to the city of Topeka and Shawnee County. During this transition, all airline flights moved from the Philip Billard Municipal Airport to the newly established Forbes Field. On June 1, 1976, the original Frontier Airlines (1950-1986) scheduled the first jet out of Forbes Field, a Boeing 737-200. Shortly afterward, the Combat Air Museum was established on the airport.

In 1981 a bond to build a new air terminal was rejected, but approved in 1982. The $5 million terminal was completed in 1985.

The terminal has five airline ticket counters and two rental car counters. Currently Hertz is the only rental car company at FOE. There is one baggage claim carousel. Several charter and military flights use the terminal today.

In 2012 the MTAA Board of Directors renamed the facility to Topeka Regional Airport and Business Center, maintaining the name of the airfield as Forbes Field. Topeka Regional Airport is currently the home of the Kansas Air National Guard's 190th Air Refueling Wing and the 1st Battalion, 108th Aviation Regiment, Kansas Army National Guard.

=== Historical airline service ===
Airline service began in the early 1930s by a small mail carrier United States Airways, which flew a route between Denver and Kansas City. Flights made stops in Goodland, Salina, and Topeka, Kansas, using a five-passenger Metal Aircraft Flamingo. In the early 1940s, three new airlines began service, flying Douglas DC-3 aircraft through the Philip Billard Municipal Airport near downtown Topeka. Trans World Airlines (TWA), added Topeka as one of many stops on the carriers' transcontinental route between Los Angeles and New York. Topeka was a stop between Wichita and Kansas City. The carrier later upgraded to Martin 4-0-4 aircraft. Braniff International Airways added Topeka as one of many stops on their mainline route between Chicago and Houston. Topeka was also a stop between Kansas City and Wichita. Continental Airlines added Topeka as a stop on a route between Denver and Kansas City that also included a stop at Salina, Kansas. Ozark Airlines also briefly served Topeka in the early 1950s with a route between Kansas City and Tulsa that stopped in Topeka and two other cities. Ozark and Braniff ended service in 1954, TWA ended in 1958 and Continental ended by 1960. Central Airlines began service in 1958 with DC-3s by picking up the routes to Kansas City and Wichita formerly operated by TWA and Braniff. The carrier then picked up Continental's route to Denver by 1960 using a Convair 240 and became the only airline at Topeka. Central's service continued until the company merged with the original Frontier Airlines in 1967. Frontier then served Topeka using 50-seat Convair 580 aircraft with nonstop flights to Kansas City as well as multi stop flights to Denver, St. Louis, and Wichita. Several air taxi and commuter airlines provided shuttle flights to Kansas City in the late 1960s and early 1970s, including Trans-Mo Airlines, Allen Aviation, Air Associates Inc., and Shawnee Air Commuter.

After moving to the current Forbes Field in 1976, Topeka then saw multiple new carriers, some providing jet service:

Frontier Airlines upgraded their service with Boeing 737-200 jets direct to Kansas City, Denver, and Wichita, and added flights to Chicago O'Hare International Airport with a stop in Lincoln, Nebraska. In the early 1980s, Frontier also operated nonstop jets to Manhattan, KS, and Joplin, MO. The carrier introduced the McDonnell Douglas MD80 jet to Topeka shortly before ending all service in 1984.

Capitol Air Service began shuttle flights to Kansas City, Manhattan, and Salina, Kansas, around 1970. From 1987 through 1989, the carrier had a codeshare agreement with the new Braniff Airways and operated as Braniff Express. Capitol Air flew Cessna 402 and de Havilland Canada DHC-6 Twin Otter aircraft and shut down about the time of the Braniff collapse in 1989.

Trans Central Airlines provided commuter flights to Oklahoma City and onto Dallas/Fort Worth in 1981 and 1982 using Fairchild Swearingen Metroliner aircraft.

The original Midway Airlines, provided Douglas DC-9-10 jet service to Chicago Midway International Airport with a stop in Kansas City from 1982 through 1985. Up to three flights per day were operated.

United Airlines provided mainline jet service in 1986 and 1987 with three daily flights to the carrier's hub at Denver, making one stop at Kansas City or Wichita, and one daily flight to Chicago O'Hare making one stop in Lincoln. Boeing 727 and Boeing 737 jets were used.

Air Midwest began commuter flights to Kansas City in 1981 using Fairchild Swearingen Metroliner II aircraft. Air Midwest went on to operate several codeshare services with major airlines, the first being with Eastern Airlines in 1985. Air Midwest operated as Eastern Express feeding Eastern's hub at Kansas City until 1988 when Eastern dismantled the Kansas City hub operation. By then Braniff had established a hub at Kansas City and Air Midwest became a Braniff Express feeder carrier along with Capitol Air. Within a year Braniff had shut down and Air Midwest reverted to operating under their own branding at Kansas City. Air Midwest also had codeshare agreements with other major airlines, including one with TWA at that carrier's hub in St. Louis. In late 1989, Air Midwest began nonstop flights from Topeka to St. Louis operating as Trans World Express while discontinuing its flights to Kansas City. British Aerospace Jetstream 31 aircraft were used. This service ended in early 1991 as Air Midwest established yet another codeshare agreement at Kansas City with US Airways. Flights to Kansas City were restored, now as US Airways Express using Beechcraft 1900 aircraft. This service was long term and continued until Air Midwest ended Topeka service in November, 2003. Air Midwest had the only service at Topeka from 1989 through 2003.

The 1980s were the boom years for traffic at Forbes Field as the airport handled up to 180,000 passengers per year. By the 1990s, however, the airport saw a dramatic drop in traffic and scheduled passenger service became subsidized by the Essential Air Service program. This subsidized service ended in May, 2003, due to federal law prohibiting a subsidy over $200 per passenger for airports within 210 miles of the nearest large or medium hub airport (Kansas City International Airport, a medium hub, is 71 miles away). This caused the final carrier, Air Midwest dba US Airways Express, to end service.

After three years with no service, Allegiant Air came to Topeka in 2006 with nonstop jet flights to Las Vegas on two days per week. The carrier used McDonnell Douglas MD80s but ended service on July 30, 2007. An additional effort to revive scheduled airline service was made when United Express, operated by ExpressJet, began flights on January 7, 2014, with two daily Embraer-145 regional jets nonstop to Chicago's O'Hare International Airport. The service only lasted eight months, however, and ceased on September 2, 2014.

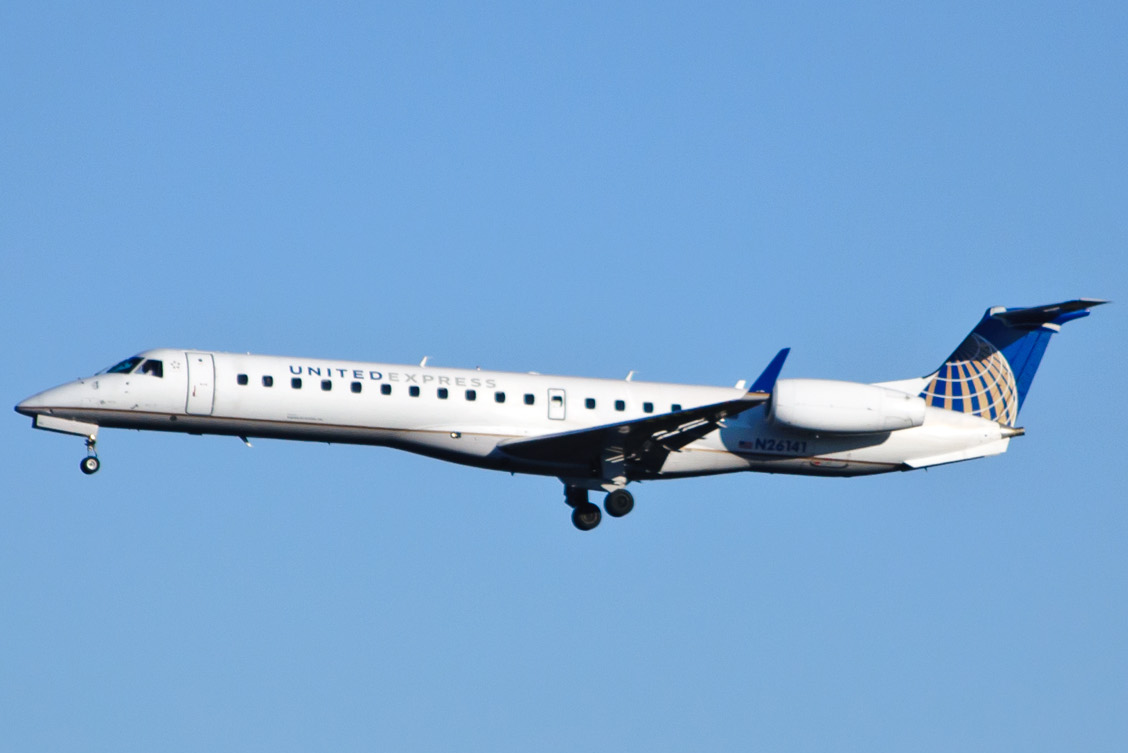
United Express was the most recent airline at Topeka, with non-stop flights to Chicago-O'Hare that ended in September 2014.

== Facilities ==
Topeka Regional Airport covers 2,854 acres (1,155 ha) at an elevation of 1,078 feet (329 m) above mean sea level. It has two concrete runways: 13/31 is 12,803 by 200 feet (3,902 x 61 m) and 3/21 is 7,001 by 150 feet (2,134 x 46 m).

In the year ending October 31, 2021, the airport had 30,086 aircraft operations, average 82 per day: 60% military, 38% general aviation, 1% air taxi, and <1% airline. 33 aircraft were then based at this airport: 7 single-engine, 1 multi-engine, 6 jet, 1 helicopter, and 18 military.

== Historical airline service ==
The airport has had no airline service since September 2, 2014.

== See also ==
- List of airports in Kansas

== Other sources ==
- Essential Air Service documents (Docket OST-1996-1352) from the U.S. Department of Transportation:
  - Order 2000-7-35 (July 28, 2000): tentatively re-selecting Air Midwest, Inc., d/b/a US Airways Express, to provide essential air service at Topeka, Kansas, for the two-year period ending December 31, 2001, at an annual subsidy rate totaling $722,199.
  - Order 2001-8-13 (August 10, 2001): tentatively re-selecting Air Midwest, Inc., d/b/a US Airways Express, to provide essential air service at Topeka, Kansas, for the two-year period beginning January 1, 2002, at an annual rate of $621,872.
  - Order 2003-2-28 (February 28, 2003): requests interested persons to show cause why we should not terminate subsidy for essential air service at Topeka, Kansas, and allow Air Midwest, Inc., d/b/a US Airways Express, to suspend service there as of May 1, 2003.
  - Order 2003-4-16 (April 18, 2003): terminates subsidy for essential air service at Topeka, Kansas, and allows Air Midwest, Inc., d/b/a US Airways Express, to suspend service as of May 1, 2003.
