= Philip Billard Municipal Airport =

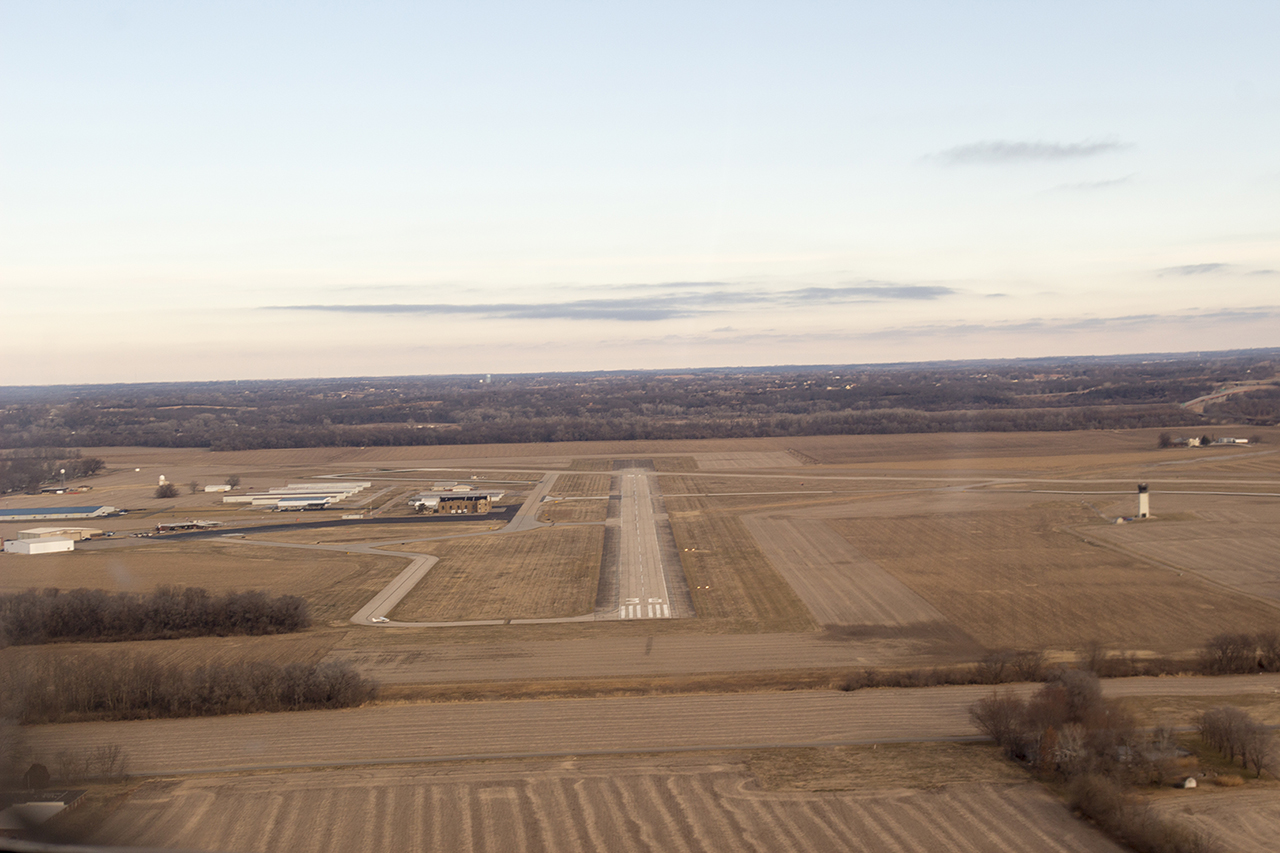
- Philip Billard airport - runway 36
- IATA: TOP; ICAO: KTOP; FAA LID: TOP

Summary
- Airport type: Public
- Owner: Metropolitan Topeka Airport Authority
- Location: Topeka, Kansas
- Elevation AMSL: 881 ft / 269 m
- Coordinates: 39°04′07″N 095°37′21″W
- Website: www.mtaa-topeka.org/billard-airport

Map
- Location of airport in Kansas TOP (the United States)

Runways
Direction	Length		Surface
Direction	ft	m	Surface
13/31	5,099	1,554	Asphalt
18/36	4,331	1,320	Asphalt

Statistics (2019)
- Aircraft operations (year ending 7/31/2019): 16,447
- Based aircraft: 77
- Source: Federal Aviation Administration

Philip Billard Municipal Airport (IATA: TOP, ICAO: KTOP, FAA LID: TOP) is a public airport three miles (4.8 km) northeast of downtown Topeka, the capital city of Kansas and the county seat of Shawnee County. It is owned by the Metropolitan Topeka Airport Authority.

The Philip Billard Airport in the Oakland neighborhood of Topeka was opened to the public in April 1940. Commercial airline services ran from its opening until 1976 when services were moved to then Forbes Field, now the Topeka Regional Airport. Several airlines included Topeka stops at Philip Billard, such as: Transcontinental Air Transport’s coast to coast in 48 hours service, and Braniff Airways added Topeka to their international line, connecting the Midwest to places like Nuevo Laredo, Ciudad, Mexico City, and even as far as Havana, Cuba.

The airport’s namesake was a significant person in the world of early aviators. Philip Billard was the son of Julius Billard, who was the mayor of Topeka from 1910 to 1913. He was a commissioned captain in the Kansas Air National Guard and was charged with forming the state's first aviation unit in 1916, designated Company B, Signal Aero Corps. This was one of the first air corps in the country, and the Billard was responsible for purchasing the airplanes himself, only to be reimbursed when at war. To help manage the upstart costs, Billard created one of the first flight schools in Kansas. Billard purchased a number of Longren Model G biplane, costing him $8,000 each. It was in these planes that Billard flew regularly in airshows, promotional events, and county fairs doing all kinds of aerial acrobatics including: spirals, loops, double loops, daylight fireworks, bomb dropping, illuminated night flights, aeroplane races, aeroplane battles, aerial advertising, and passenger carrying.

Philip Billard died on July 24, 1918 while test flying a DeHaviland 4 in France for the US Army in WWI.

== Facilities and aircraft ==
Philip Billard Municipal Airport covers 920 acres (370 ha) and has two runways:

- 13/31: 5,099 ft × 100 ft (1,554 m × 30 m) asphalt
- 18/36: 4,331 ft × 75 ft (1,320 m × 23 m) asphalt

In the year ending July 31, 2019, the airport had 16,447 aircraft operations, average 45 per day: 95% general aviation, 3% air taxi, and 2% military. 77 aircraft were then based at this airport: 68 single engine, 5 multi-engine, 2 jets, and 2 helicopters.

== See also ==
- List of airports in Kansas
