= Kansas State Cabinet =

The Kansas State Cabinet is part of the executive branch of the Government of the U.S. state of Kansas, consisting of the appointed heads of the Kansas state executive departments.

== Current cabinet departments ==
The Kansas State Cabinet, under current Governor Laura Kelly, consists of the Lieutenant Governor of Kansas, the Adjutant General, the Superintendent of Highway Patrol, and eleven departments each headed by a Secretary.

- Lieutenant Governor – chief deputy to the Governor, responsible for acting as Governor during the Governor's absence.
- The Adjutant General – runs the day-to-day administration of the Kansas National Guard, including the organization, training, and preparation of the Guard.
- Secretary of Administration – manages the Kansas Department of Administration, oversees many of the administrative areas of the state's bureaus and departments, including payroll, maintenance of public buildings, and information technology.
- Secretary for Aging and Disability Services – manages the Kansas Department for Aging and Disability Services, and is responsible for programs affecting the elderly and people with physical and developmental disabilities, as well as addiction and mental health programs. It has oversight of the five state hospitals.
- Secretary of Agriculture – manages the Kansas Department of Agriculture, mainly a regulatory agency, oversees departments that protect and educate consumers about Kansas's agricultural and livestock productions.
- Secretary of Commerce – manages the Kansas Department of Commerce, charged with the creation and retention of jobs, the growth of investment, the development of communities, the increase of per capita income within the State
- Secretary of Corrections – responsible for corrections in Kansas, including state prisons.
- Secretary of Health and Environment – the largest state department with two divisions Health and Environment.
- Superintendent of Highway Patrol – oversees the Highway Patrol, which ensures safety on the state's highways.
- Secretary of Labor – responsible for enforcing the state's labor laws, and for educating the public about these laws.
- Secretary of Revenue – oversees the collection of taxes and administers the state treasury.
- Secretary for Children and Families – oversees child care, child abuse prevention and welfare programs.
- Secretary of Transportation – charged with providing a safe, economical, and effective transportation network for the people, commerce and communities of Kansas.
- Secretary of Wildlife and Parks – oversees the state's game and fish industry, regulates hunting and fishing licenses, and educates the public on safety relating to the outdoors.

== Current cabinet members ==
The current Kansas State Cabinet, serving under Governor of Kansas Laura Kelly, is as follows:

Office	Incumbent
Lieutenant Governor	David Toland
Adjutant General	Michael Venerdi
Secretary of Administration	Adam Proffitt
Secretary of Aging and Disability Services	Laura Howard
Secretary of Agriculture	Mike Beam
Secretary of Children and Families	Laura Howard
Secretary of Commerce	David Toland
Secretary of Corrections	Jeff Zmuda
Secretary of Health and Environment	Janet Stanek
Superintendent of the Highway Patrol	Erik Smith
Secretary of Labor	Amber Shultz
Secretary of Revenue	Mark Burghart
Secretary of Transportation	Calvin Reed
Secretary of Wildlife and Parks	Chris Kennedy
