= William Thornton (Kansas politician) =

American politician from Kansas

Kansas Secretary of Commerce
- In office November 2009 – January 2011
- Appointed by: Mark Parkinson
- Preceded by: David Kerr
- Succeeded by: Pat George

Personal details
- Party: Democratic

William Thornton is an American politician from Kansas who was the Kansas Secretary of Commerce from November 2009 to January 2011. He was appointed by Governor Mark Parkinson when David Kerr resigned to serve as Director of the Missouri Department of Economic Development. As Secretary, Thornton oversaw the operations of Kansas Department of Commerce.

Thornton received a bachelor's degree from Benedictine College and a Juris Doctor from Washburn University's School of Law. Thornton worked with Hallmark Cards and also as an attorney with Duncan-Senecal Law Offices, Chartered, in Atchison.

Thornton was appointed to the Kansas Board of Regents by former Governor Kathleen Sebelius in 2007, as well as the Kansas Mentor's Leadership Council and the Kansas Health Care Information Exchange Commission. He was appointed to the Advisory Committee of the Kansas Long Range Transportation Plan by Secretary of Transportation Deb Miller.

On October 30, 2009, Thornton was appointed as Kansas Secretary of Commerce by Governor Mark Parkinson.

He also served as the Atchison Hospital Association's Board Chair, on the University of Kansas’ Multicultural Scholars National Board of Advisors, as the Vice President of Citizens for Community Action of Atchison, as a board member and District Leader for the Midori Yama Budokai Martial Arts Association and as President of the Trustee Board for Shiloh Baptist Church.
