= Kansas state budget (2008–09) =

Kansas, like many other states, is facing a $186 million gap for fiscal year 2009 and according to early estimates approximately $1 billion deficit for fiscal year 2010. However, more recent estimates place FY 2010's shortfall at $654 million.
Governor Kathleen Sebelius recommended $600 million in budget cuts for FY 2010 which includes eliminating programs, closing facilities, freezing new hires, and reducing spending. However, in light of the federal economic stimulus package Sebelius amended her recommended budget to "prevent harm" to the state. "Budget cuts deeper than what I have already recommended are not necessary, and would in fact do great harm to our state’s economy and employment levels," said Sebelius. However, state officials said their target for reductions in fiscal 2010 is greater than the Governor's recommendations - $625 million. According to the Governor's recommended budget, the proposed cuts could reduce the projected FY2010 shortfall $103 million, however that estimate depends on $57 million in revenue from state-owned casinos that haven’t yet been built.

However, Sebelius' 2009 appointment by President Barack Obama as United States Secretary of Health and Human Services had some state legislators that the nomination is a "distraction" from the state's budget crisis. "The state budget remains substantially out of balance, and she will leave behind no consensus on how to balance it," said Senate majority leader Derek Schmidt. House minority leader Paul Davis said that he expected nothing but a smooth transition when Sebelius left office. Lieutenant Governor Former Republican Party leader turned Democrat Mark Parkinson assumed Sebelius' role as governor.

== Impact of budget woes ==
- The Department of Corrections faced a cut in state funding from the current $276 million to $257 million in the next budget year. However, officials said they fear that the cut would impede on Kansas' progress on prison reforms. "We are systematically undoing those things that have led to lower prison populations, lower recidivism rates, lower absconder rates and lower reconviction rates," said Corrections Secretary Roger Werholtz."I think it's unavoidable with the kind of budget rescissions the state is having to make." For 2010 the Governor recommended $7.6 million for parole and post-release programs, a 5.7 percent cut from what the agency requested.
- In February 2009 a Senate committee recommended that the state cut funding to higher education by 13 percent, $120 million. Educators warned state officials that such "drastic cuts" would lead to layoffs, crowded classes and cuts in courses.
- Kansas City area's December unemployment rate was 6.5 percent, up from 6.2 percent in November and 5.1 percent in December 2007. Nonfarm employment in the Kansas City area was 1.01 million in December, down 11,800 jobs, or 1.2 percent, from a year earlier, compared with a national decrease of 2 percent. The nation’s nonfarm unemployment rate hit 8.5 percent in January.
- In December the state of Kansas saw unemployment rates increase by a tenth of a percent to 4.9 compared to November's 4.8 percent. Department of Labor figures also showed 37,482 Kansans filed initial claims for unemployment benefits in December - twice the number filed in December 2007.

== Budget background ==
The Kansas state fiscal year begins July 1 and ends June 30. On October 1 all of the state's agencies submit their budget requests to the governor and the legislature. Kansas has 20 state agencies which operate on a biennial system but are authorized to file budget adjustment requests every other year. The governor presents the proposed budget to both the House and the Senate for consideration. From February through April state officials deliberate on the proposed budget. By early June the governor evaluates any and all changes before a final decision is approved.
The FY 2009 budget totaled $13.5 billion, a $334.2 million or a 2.5 percent increase from FY 2008. The general fund for FY 2009 totaled $6.4 billion, a $266.8 million or 4.3 percent increase from FY 2008.

=== Budget figures ===
The following table provides a history of Kansas' expenditures and gross domestic product (GDP).

Fiscal Year	Expenditures (billions)	GDP (billions)
2000	$14.4	$82.8
2001	$15.6	$86.4
2002	$16.7	$89.6
2003	$17.5	$93.6
2004	$18.4	$98.4
2005	$18.9	$103.3
2006	$20.3	$110.6
2007	$21.7	$117.3
2008	$23.3	$124.4
2009	$24.9*	$131.9*

- NOTE: The figures for FY 2009 won't be finalized until the end of the fiscal year.

== Ideas about why the crisis exists ==
- According to the state Department of Revenue preliminary February 2009 tax collections show that tax collections were about $12 million short of expectations. The state's official economic forecast predicted Kansas could collect $251 million in general tax revenues. Instead, it collected about $239 million.
- The Shawnee County Commission is spurring efforts to correct prior oversights in the distribution of state fuel tax revenues to local governments. Errors in the annual fuel tax revenue distributions date to 1999 because of a faulty computer program, said state officials, and were not discovered until 2008. Shawnee County, for example, was shorted approximately $3.3 million.

== Proposed actions ==
=== Governor Kathleen Sebelius ===
In light of the state's current budget crisis the former Governor recommended $600 million in budget cuts and had not recommended an increase in taxes, however in late February 2009 the Sebelius administration recommended dedicating $909 million of the federal stimulus package to providing a cushion for the current budget, preventing a deficit in fiscal 2010. Sebelius also proposed to use another $384 million in stimulus funds for public schools, split between fiscal 2010 and fiscal 2011. The Governor suggested in February 2009 that the state move $225 million into the state's main bank account from other state government accounts however, in late February Republicans in both the House and the Senate prevented the move. Those legislators said that first the Governor must sign a bill balancing the budget for the fiscal year ending June 30, 2009. Additionally the Governor's recent proposal kept kindergarten through high school funding at 2009 levels because of the anticipated influx of money that the state would receive from the federal economic stimulus package. Her plan calls for $367 million in recovery funds from the stimulus bill to stabilize K-12 funding and to restore higher education funding to the previous year's level. In February 2009 Sebelius signed off on a $300 million deficit reduction package to address shortfalls in the state budget this year.

=== Republicans ===
In January Senate committee chairman Jay Emler proposed a 3.4 percent across-the-board cut in the current state budget. According to his plan it would adjust the current state budget by $302 million by June 30. Republicans said that they expect the deficit to grow more than the projected amount and that said Emler is the reason behind his aggressive plan. The governor proposed targeted spending cuts and accounting changes to eliminate a projected $186 million budget deficit, less aggressive than Emler's proposal. The Senate's Republican leaders fashioned a proposal to make $266 million worth of cuts, with a total of $302 million in adjustments to the current budget. The reductions included a $99 million cut in aid to public schools - compared with $7 million in the bipartisan Senate bill. Rep. Lee Tafanelli said, ""All we're doing is basically kicking the can down the road just a little bit farther."
In February the Governor recommended moving $225 million into the state's main budget account from other individual state accounts, Republicans in the House and the Senate prevented the move until the Governor signs a bill balancing the FY 2009 budget.

=== Democrats ===
Democrats urged Gov. Sebelius to veto recommended school budget cuts, $28 million in funding for public schools and $4.5 million for special education, by legislators. They said they worried the reductions could bankrupt small, rural districts that don’t have large reserves. Senate Minority Leader Anthony Hensley and House Minority Leader Paul Davis said Friday they believe the legislation cuts education far too deep. In an effort to increase the state's minimum wage Hensley proposed a bill would require the Kansas Department of Labor to adjust the caps on workers’ comp benefits to an amount equal to the Midwest cost of living adjustment. The bill failed to pass the Senate but did pass the House. Even so, Hensley said that he proposed a change to his bill that would phase in the increases. The bill raises Kansas' wage from $2.65 to $7.25 on Jan. 1, so it will match the federal minimum.

=== Economic stimulus package ===
Kansas is expected to receive approximately $1.7 billion from the $787 billion economic stimulus package. According to White House officials the stimulus bill is estimated to create or save 33,000 jobs.

According to preliminary reports Kansas is expected to receive:

- $350 million for highways construction projects
- 27 million for transit projects
- $440 million for health care
- $55 million to help make moderate income homes more energy efficient
- $106.9 million for special education
- $93 million for schools with large numbers of low-income students
- $367.4 million for a stabilization fund that can be used for public schools and higher education

== Budget transparency ==
KanView is the name of Kansas's publicly available online spending database. As a result of the Kansas Legislative House Committee on Government Efficiency and Technology, the legislature and governor passed legislation in 2007 and 2008 that mandates greater financial transparency for Kansas state government.

=== Legislation ===
- Kansas Senate Bill 316, Kansas Taxpayer Transparency Act

=== Economic stimulus transparency ===
- The Economic Recovery and Reinvestment Act of 2009 designated $787 billion to be spent throughout the U.S. Of that $787 billion stimulus package, it is estimated that 69%, or over $541 billion, will be administered by state governments.
- It is estimated that Kansas will receive at least $1.3 billion in federal funding.
- The economic recovery website for Kansas is available here.

=== Government tools ===
KanView provides a searchable database of state financial information, organized by expenditures and revenues for the five categories of Agency, Fund, Program, Object and Vendor. Annual expenditures and revenues are updated soon after the close of Kansas's fiscal year, which runs from July 1 to June 30.

The following table is helpful in evaluating the level of transparency provided by KanView:

Criteria for evaluating spending databases
State Database	Searchability	Grants	Contracts	Line Item Expenditures	Dept/Agency Budgets	Public Employee Salary
KanView	Yes	Yes	Yes	No	No	No

==== Limitations and suggestions ====
KanView was supposed to contain information on salaries and wages, including compensation paid to individual state employees. This requirement is clearly specified in the language of the Kansas Taxpayer Transparency law. But the powers-that-be have kept detailed public employee salary information OFF the Web site. KanView only lists summary data on salaries, not the individual information required by law. You can call the Kansas Department of Administration at (785) 296-3011 and demand that the letter of the law be followed by putting specific wage and salary information online.

=== Support for creation of the database ===
KanView stemmed from the Kansas Taxpayer Transparency Program of 2007, and was authorized when governor Kathleen Sebelius signed the Kansas Taxpayer Transparency Act in 2008.

Americans for Tax Reform applauded Kansas's level of transparency, as did the National Taxpayers Union.

=== Public employee salary information ===
The Kansas City Star maintains a searchable database of state employee information for the year 2007. Access it here.

Kanview is by law required to include "salaries and wages including, but not limited to, compensation paid to individual employees of state agencies," but the state has yet to post this information. Kansas residents can call the Kansas Department of Administration and complain about this omission at (785) 296-3011.
