= David Kerr =

David Kerr may refer to:

- David Kerr, baseball executive, General Manager of Mississippi Mud Monsters
- Dave Kerr (1909–1978), Canadian ice hockey player
- David Kerr (cricketer) (1923–1989), Australian cricketer
- David Kerr (director) (born 1967), British television director
- David Kerr (cinematographer), British cinematographer
- David Kerr (religion scholar) (1945–2008), British scholar of Christian-Muslim relations and world Christianity
- David Kerr (Northern Irish politician) (born 1957), chair of the Third Way group
- David Kerr (Ontario politician) (1900–1978), Canadian politician
- David Kerr (footballer) (born 1974), Scottish footballer
- David Kerr (Missouri politician), Director of the Missouri Department of Economic Development
- David Kerr (English politician) (1923–2009), British Labour Member of Parliament, 1964–1970
- David Kerr (oncologist) (born 1956), cancer specialist
- David Kerr (nephrologist) (1927–2014), British nephrologist
- David Kerr (Iowa politician) (born 1948), American politician
- David Kerr (rugby union) (1899–1969), Scotland rugby union player
- David Garret Kerr, American mining engineer
- David Kerr (Kansas politician) (born 1945), American politician
- David Kerr, victim of the Dunblane massacre
- Dave Kerr, The creator and composer for My Singing Monsters and the composer for Shrek (video game)
- Martin Kerr (born 1952), formerly called David Kerr, American neo-Nazi
