= Eric Carter =

Eric Carter may refer to:

- Eric Carter (BMX rider) (born 1970), American BMX rider
- Eric Carter (pilot) (1920–2021), British Royal Air Force pilot
- Eric Carter (Canadian football) (born 1969), Canadian football player
- Eric Carter (Kansas politician) (born 1972), American politician and member of the Kansas House of Representatives
- Eric Carter, character from 24: Legacy
