= David Kerr (Missouri politician) =

American politician

Director of the Missouri Department of Economic Development
- Incumbent
- Assumed office November 9, 2009
- Appointed by: Jay Nixon
- Preceded by: Linda Martinez

Kansas Secretary of Commerce
- In office April 2007 – November 9, 2009
- Appointed by: Kathleen Sebelius
- Succeeded by: William Thornton

Personal details
- Party: Republican
- Spouse: Mary Kerr

David Kerr was appointed secretary of the Kansas Department of Commerce by Governor Kathleen Sebelius in April 2007. On October 29, 2009, Kerr resigned from his position as Kansas Secretary of Commerce to serve as Director of the Missouri Department of Economic Development.

== Personal life ==
Kerr grew up in the western Kansas town of Ness City, graduated from Savior of the World High School in Bonner Springs and attended Fort Hays State University. He earned bachelor’s degrees in both economics and business administration from Avila University in Kansas City and is a former Topeka Jaycee of the Year.

Kerr joined Kansas Department of Commerce after serving as President of AT&T Kansas from 2003–2007, where he was responsible for all regulatory, legislative, governmental and external affairs activities in the state. Prior to being named President, Kerr served as vice president and general manager of local interconnection services, with responsibility for serving competitive local telephone companies.

Kerr joined AT&T in Topeka in 1979. In 1981, he moved to St. Louis, where he held positions of increasing responsibility while leading marketing, account and finance teams. He moved to Dallas in 1997 to become Vice President, Access Marketing.
