= Joann Flower =

American politician (born 1935)

Member of the Kansas House of Representatives from the 47th district
- In office 1989–2000
- Preceded by: Robin Leach
- Succeeded by: Lee Tafanelli

Member of the Kansas House of Representatives from the 47th district
- In office 2005–2005
- Preceded by: Lee Tafanelli
- Succeeded by: Lee Tafanelli

Personal details
- Born: May 6, 1935 (age 91) Elkhart, Kansas
- Party: Republican
- Spouse: Paul Flower
- Children: 2
- Education: Johns Hopkins University

Joann Flower (born May 6, 1935) is an American former politician who served for six terms in the Kansas House of Representatives, as well as an additional year after her initial stint.

Flower was born and raised in rural western Kansas. She attended Johns Hopkins University and worked as a nurse before returning to Kansas, marrying her husband Paul, and raising two children. She got involved in local Republican politics, serving as a county chair for U.S. Senator Nancy Kassebaum and managing a friend's campaign for Jefferson County commissioner, and decided to run for the Kansas House herself in the 1988 elections. She successfully unseated 12-year incumbent Robin D. Leach, and served for six terms in the House; she was succeeded in 2001 by fellow Republican Lee Tafanelli.

In 2005, Tafanelli, still serving in the Kansas House, was deployed to Iraq due to his service in the Kansas National Guard as part of Operation Iraqi Freedom. Flower was appointed to fill his seat while he was deployed, and served for an additional year during 2005; after Tafanelli's return from overseas, he resumed his seat.
