= Sarah Shipman =

Former Kansas secretary of administration

Kansas Secretary of Administration
- In office February 17, 2016 – January 16, 2019
- Governor: Sam Brownback; Jeff Colyer
- Preceded by: Jim Clark
- Succeeded by: Duane Goossen

Personal details
- Born: c. 1973
- Spouse: Scott Shipman
- Children: 2
- Education: Southwestern College (BS); Washburn University (JD)

Sarah L. Shipman is the former Kansas Secretary of Administration, serving in that position from 2016 to 2019.

== Education ==
Shipman graduated from Southwestern College in Winfield in May 1995 and Washburn University School of Law in May 2005, where she was editor of the Washburn Law Journal. She is a 2024 graduate of the Bishop Kemper School for Ministry.

== Career ==
Shipman was associate general counsel for MRV, Inc. in Topeka, handling commercial real estate from August 2005 to May 2008. From May 2008 to October 2011, Shipman was the vice president and counsel for Silver Lake Bank in Topeka. In 2011, Shipman became an adjunct faculty member at the Washburn University School of Law from 2011 to 2013.

Shipman is a member of the Kansas Bar Association, and she is active in the Girl Scouts of the USA.

=== Kansas Department of Administration ===
Between October 2011 and January 2013, Shipman was deputy director for leasing and real estate for the Kansas Department of Administration. Shipman served as the department's chief Counsel from January 2013 through July 2015. In March 2014, Shipman became deputy secretary.

On July 24, 2015, Governor Sam Brownback announced that Shipman would become Kansas Secretary of Administration, following the retirement of Jim Clark. She was confirmed by the Kansas Senate on February 17, 2016.

== Personal life ==
Shipman's husband is Scott Shipman. They have two children.
