= Jerry Henry =

American politician

Member of the Kansas House of Representatives from the 63rd district
- In office January 13, 2003 – January 9, 2017
- Preceded by: Bruce Larkin
- Succeeded by: John Eplee

Member of the Kansas House of Representatives from the 48th district
- In office January 11, 1993 – January 13, 2003
- Preceded by: Joan Adam
- Succeeded by: Eric Carter

Personal details
- Born: February 5, 1956 (age 70) Seneca, Kansas, U.S.
- Party: Democratic
- Spouse: Linda

Jerry Henry (February 5, 1956) is a former Democratic member of the Kansas House of Representatives, representing the 48th and 63rd district. He served from 1993 to 2003, 2003 to 2017, when he was succeeded by Republican John Eplee.

Henry is the executive director of Achievement Services for Northeast Kansas, which works with developmentally disabled adults. Prior to his election to the House he served four years on the Atchison City Commission and one year as the city's mayor.

He and wife Linda have three children and five grandchildren.

== Committee membership ==
- Appropriations
- Transportation
- Social Services Budget (Ranking Member)
- Joint Committee on Corrections and Juvenile Justice Oversight
- Joint Committee on Home and Community Based Services Oversight

== Major donors ==
The top 5 donors to Henry's 2008 campaign:

- 1. Kansas Optometric Assoc $750
- 2. Kansas Contractors Assoc $600
- 3. Kansans for Quality MHS $500
- 4. Ruffin, Phil $500
- 5. Kansas Medical Society $500
