= Pat George =

American politician (born 1956)

Patrick (Pat) George

Kansas Secretary of Commerce
- In office January 2011 – July 2015
- Governor: Sam Brownback
- Preceded by: William Thornton
- Succeeded by: Michael Copeland

Member of the Kansas House of Representatives from the 119th district
- In office January 10, 2005 – January 10, 2011
- Preceded by: H. Jan Scoggins-Waite
- Succeeded by: Brian Weber

Personal details
- Born: February 26, 1956 (age 70) Dodge City, Kansas, U.S.
- Party: Republican
- Spouse: Lori George (divorced)
- Children: Anna George, Thomas George, Maris George
- Education: Benedictine College
- Profession: Businessman, politician

Patrick (Pat) George (born February 26, 1956) is an American businessman and politician from Kansas. He is currently the president and CEO of Valley Hope Association in Norton, Kansas.

In 2010, George was elected as the State Representative of the 119th district and served from 2005 to January 10, 2011. He served under Governor Sam Brownback. Brownback had previously announced his intention to nominate George to serve as commerce secretary. George's appointment was confirmed by the Kansas Senate on February 3, 2011. He resigned in July 2015 to work with Valley Hope.

George was a co-owner of the Dodge City Legend professional basketball team. Additionally, he has been a partner in a number of businesses, including the Dodge City Steak Company and G and G Incorporated.

He has his B.A. in psychology from Benedictine College.

== Committee membership ==
As a Kansas State Representative, George served on the following committees prior to his appointment as secretary:

- Taxation
- Vision 2020 (Vice-Chair)
- Veterans, Military, and Homeland Security
- Economic Development and Tourism
- Joint Committee on Economic Development

== Major donors ==
The top 5 donors to George's 2008 campaign:

- 1. Kansas Contractors Assoc $1,000
- 2. Kansas Assoc of Insurance Agents $600
- 3. Ruffin, Phil $500
- 4. Carr, M E $500
- 5. Kansas Beer Wholesalers Assoc $500
