= Joan Adam =

American politician

Member of the Kansas House of Representatives from the 48th district
- In office 1983–1992
- Preceded by: Richard Cameron
- Succeeded by: Jerry Henry

Personal details
- Born: April 4, 1944 (age 82)
- Party: Democratic

Joan Adam (born April 4, 1944) is an American politician, attorney and historic preservation advocate who served five terms as a member of the Kansas House of Representatives as the representative from the 48th district in Atchison, Kansas. A Democrat, she was elected to the House of Representatives in 1982 and served until the end of her fifth term in 1992; in January 1993, she was succeeded by Jerry Henry.

Representative Adam authored the Kansas Heritage Trust Fund during her tenure in the Kansas Legislature. A resident of Kansas City, Kansas, she is a board member of Historic Kansas City and a former president of Historic Kansas City.
