= Ramon Gonzalez Jr. =

American politician

Member of the Kansas House of Representatives from the 47th district
- In office January 8, 2011 – January 9, 2017
- Preceded by: Lee Tafanelli
- Succeeded by: Ronald Ellis

Personal details
- Born: Ramon C. Gonzalez Jr. November 6, 1947 (age 78) Guadalajara, Mexico
- Party: Republican
- Spouse: Yolanda
- Profession: Special investigator, police chief

Ramon C. Gonzalez Jr. (November 6, 1947) was elected to the Kansas House of Representatives as Republican member in 2011. Gonzalez is from Perry, Kansas where he serves as police chief. Elected in a special election by the Republican precinct delegates to replace Lee Tafanelli who had resigned from the State House of Representatives to become the adjutant general of Kansas.

Gonzalaez spent most of his career as an employee of Southwestern Bell from which he has retired. He also currently works as a special investigator with the Jefferson County, Kansas Sheriff's Office.
