= Jessie Branson =

American politician

Member of the Kansas House of Representatives from the 44th district
- In office 1981–1990
- Preceded by: Betty Jo Charlton
- Succeeded by: Sandy Praeger

Personal details
- Born: December 21, 1920 Cummings, Kansas
- Died: January 3, 2009 Lawrence, Kansas
- Party: Democratic

Jessie M. Branson (December 21, 1920–January 3, 2009) was an American politician who served as a Democratic member of the Kansas House of Representatives from 1981 to 1990. She represented the 44th District and lived in Lawrence, Kansas.
