= Tod Bunting =

United States Air Force general

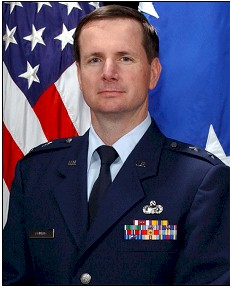
- Born: October 7, 1958 (age 68); Wichita, Kansas
- Military career
- Allegiance: United States of America; Kansas
- Branch: United States Air Force
- Service years: 1979–2011
- Rank: Major general
- Awards: Legion of Merit; Meritorious Service Medal (4); Air Force Commendation Medal (3); Army Commendation Medal (2); Air Force Achievement Medal (3); National Defense Service Medal (2); Military Outstanding Volunteer Service Medal; Armed Forces Reserve Medal; New Jersey ANG Distinguished Service Medal

Major General Tod M. Bunting (born October 7, 1958) is a retired Adjutant General of Kansas; he was appointed by Governor Kathleen Sebelius and confirmed by the Kansas Senate on February 11, 2004. Bunting retired on January 8, 2011.

== Military career ==
Major General Bunting was commissioned as a distinguished graduate of the Air National Guard Academy of Military Science in 1979 and served in a variety of positions at all levels of the Air National Guard. His experience includes serving in fighter, bomber, and air refueling units and at the National Guard State Headquarters level. Bunting has served in personnel, services, information management, as wing executive officer, as a deputy commander, and support group commander. During his career, he served in Kansas Air National Guard units including the 190th Air Refueling Group, 184th Tactical Fighter Group, 184th Bomb Wing, and in the State Headquarters of the Kansas Air National Guard. Additional assignments include duty in Colorado and Texas.

His wife, Barbara is a high school teacher.

=== Assignments ===
- November 1979 – June 1984, chief of personnel utilization, training officer, 190th Air Refueling Group, Forbes Field, Kansas
- June 1984 – September 1984, services officer, 184th Tactical Fighter Group, McConnell Air Force Base, Kansas
- September 1984 – July 1987, executive support officer, 184th Fighter Group, McConnell Air Force Base, Kansas
- July 1987 – May 1993, deputy commander for support, 184th Fighter Group, McConnell Air Force Base, Kansas
- May 1993 – November 1997, executive support staff officer, Adjutant General's Department, Kansas Air National Guard, Topeka, Kansas
- November 1997 – April 1999, Air National Guard advisor to the commander of Air Reserve Personnel Center, Denver, Colorado
- April 1999 – October 2002, Air National Guard advisor to the commander of Air Force Personnel Center, Randolph Air Force Base, Texas.
- October 2002 – January 2004, director of diversity, personnel and training, Air National Guard Readiness Center, Arlington, Virginia.
- January 2004 – February 2004, chief of staff, Headquarters, Kansas Air National Guard, Topeka, Kansas
- February 2004 – January 2011, The Adjutant General, Joint Forces Headquarters, Kansas National Guard, Topeka, Kansas

=== Major awards and decorations ===
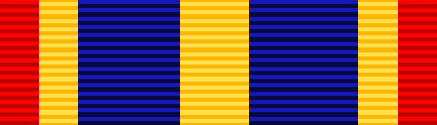
| Legion of Merit |
| Meritorious Service Medal with three bronze oak leaf clusters |
| Air Force Commendation Medal with two bronze oak leaf clusters |
| Army Commendation Medal with bronze oak leaf cluster |
| Air Force Achievement Medal with two bronze oak leaf clusters |
| Air Force Outstanding Unit Award with bronze oak leaf cluster |
| Air Force Organizational Excellence Award with bronze oak leaf cluster |
| National Defense Service Medal with bronze service star |
| Military Outstanding Volunteer Service Medal |
| Air Force Longevity Service Award with silver oak leaf cluster |
| Armed Forces Reserve Medal with silver hourglass device |
| Air Force Training Ribbon |
| New Jersey Air National Guard Distinguished Service Medal |
| Kansas Air National Guard Meritorious Service Ribbon with two bronze oak leaf clusters |
| Kansas Air National Guard Recruiting Ribbon with bronze oak leaf cluster |

=== Effective dates of promotion ===
Promotions
| Insignia | Rank | Date |
|---|---|---|
| | Major general | November 18, 2005 |
| | Brigadier general | January 21, 2004 |
| | Colonel | June 27, 1997 |
| | Lieutenant colonel | January 27, 1992 |
| | Major | January 27, 1988 |
| | Captain | November 14, 1983 |
| | First lieutenant | November 13, 1981 |
| | Second lieutenant | September 27, 1979 |

Military offices
| Preceded by Gregory Gardner | Adjutant General of Kansas; February 11, 2004 - January 8, 2011 | Succeeded by Lee Tafanelli |
