= Chuck DeVore =

American politician (born 1962)

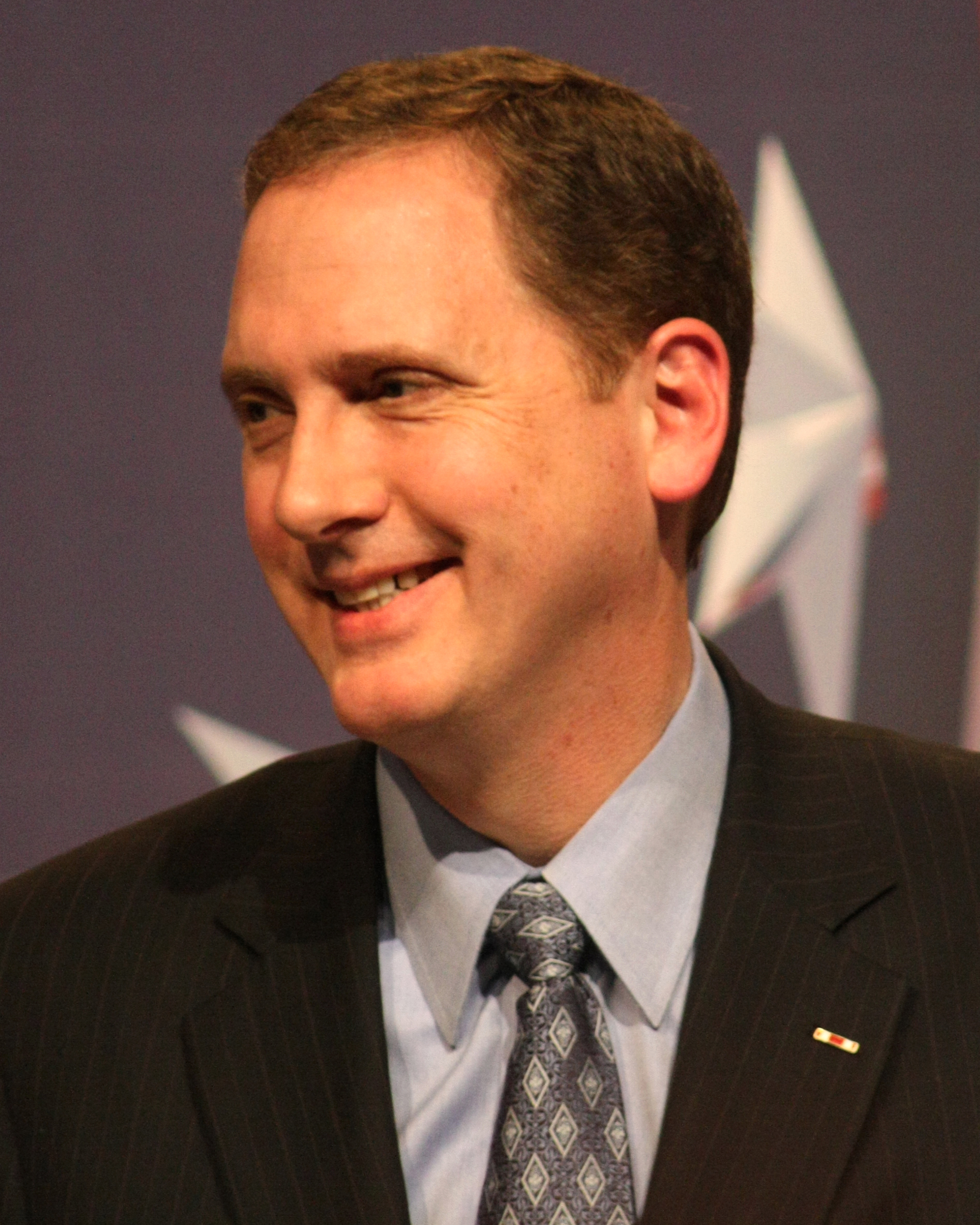
- Chuck DeVore speaking at CPAC

Member of the California State Assembly from the 70th district
- In office December 6, 2004 – November 30, 2010
- Preceded by: John Campbell
- Succeeded by: Don Wagner

Personal details
- Born: May 20, 1962 (age 64) Seattle, Washington
- Party: Republican
- Spouse: Diane DeVore
- Children: Two daughters
- Education: Claremont McKenna College
- Occupation: Aerospace Executive
- Website: Chuck DeVore

Military service
- Allegiance: United States
- Branch/service: U.S. Army Reserve, California Army National Guard
- Years of service: 1983–2007
- Rank: Lieutenant Colonel
- Unit: 40th Infantry Division (Mechanized)

Charles S. "Chuck" DeVore (born May 20, 1962) is an American politician who served as a Republican member of the California State Assembly from 2004 to 2010 when he lived in Irvine and represented the 70th District, which includes portions of Orange County. DeVore was Vice Chair of the Assembly Revenue and Taxation Committee as well as Vice Chair of the Veterans Affairs Committee. He also served on the Budget Committee and was a member of the Joint Legislative Audit Committee. After losing a 2010 bid for Republican nomination for the United States Senate, in 2011 DeVore moved to Texas to work for the Texas Public Policy Foundation where he is now Vice President for National Initiatives.

== Education ==
DeVore earned a full Army ROTC scholarship that allowed him to obtain a bachelor's degree in Strategic Studies (cum laude) in 1985 from Claremont McKenna College. He was named a Distinguished Military Graduate. He studied abroad at American University in Cairo, Egypt. He's a graduate of the U.S. Army's Command and General Staff Officer Course.

== Early life ==
DeVore served as Special Assistant for Foreign Affairs to the Assistant Secretary of Defense for Legislative Affairs during the Reagan administration from 1986 to 1988. In 1992, his national guard unit was activated during the 1992 Los Angeles riots. He later worked as Vice President of Communications and Research for Irvine-based aerospace company SM&A from 1991 to 2004. He was a Claremont Institute Lincoln Fellow in 2004.

== Bills and domestic policy positions ==
DeVore resigned his position as Chief Republican Whip in February 2009 in protest of a $12 billion per year tax increase agreed to by Republican leadership. While a California lawmaker, DeVore favored offshore oil drilling along the California coast as well as the development of modern nuclear power plants. He opposed the federal stimulus package in 2009. He is pro-life. DeVore signed the official ballot argument against California's High Speed Railbond act in the November 4, 2008 election.

== Foreign policy positions ==
DeVore has voiced reluctance to commit the U.S. military to open-ended nation building efforts. He criticized President Obama's 2009 plan for Afghanistan, saying, "(The) piecemeal buildup will not defeat the Taliban..." and "...such a strategy expends resources now sorely needed to rebuild our military and retool it for future challenges from a rapidly modernizing People's Republic of China to a revanchist Islamic Republic of Iran." He appeared on Fox Business News to warn about the Libyan intervention.

== 2010 United States Senate bid ==
DeVore declared his candidacy for the 2010 Republican nomination for the U.S. Senate seat held by three-term Democratic senator Barbara Boxer. In the Republican primary on June 8, DeVore finished third out of five candidates with 19.3% of the vote with Carly Fiorina winning the Republican nomination. DeVore raised $2.6 million for his primary effort.

DeVore's campaign was sued for copyright infringement by musician Don Henley for use by the campaign of two parodies of two songs by Henley, "After the Hope of November is Gone" (after "The Boys of Summer") and "All She Wants to Do is Tax" (after "All She Wants to Do Is Dance"). Henley eventually prevailed; Devore and a campaign worker issued a public statement apologizing to Henley.

== Life since 2010 ==
DeVore moved to Texas in late 2011 to accept a job as a visiting scholar at the nonprofit Texas Public Policy Foundation writing about Texas's low taxes and regulations and its effects on business climate, in contrast to other states. By the summer of 2012, DeVore had been named a vice president at the conservative think tank.

== Books ==
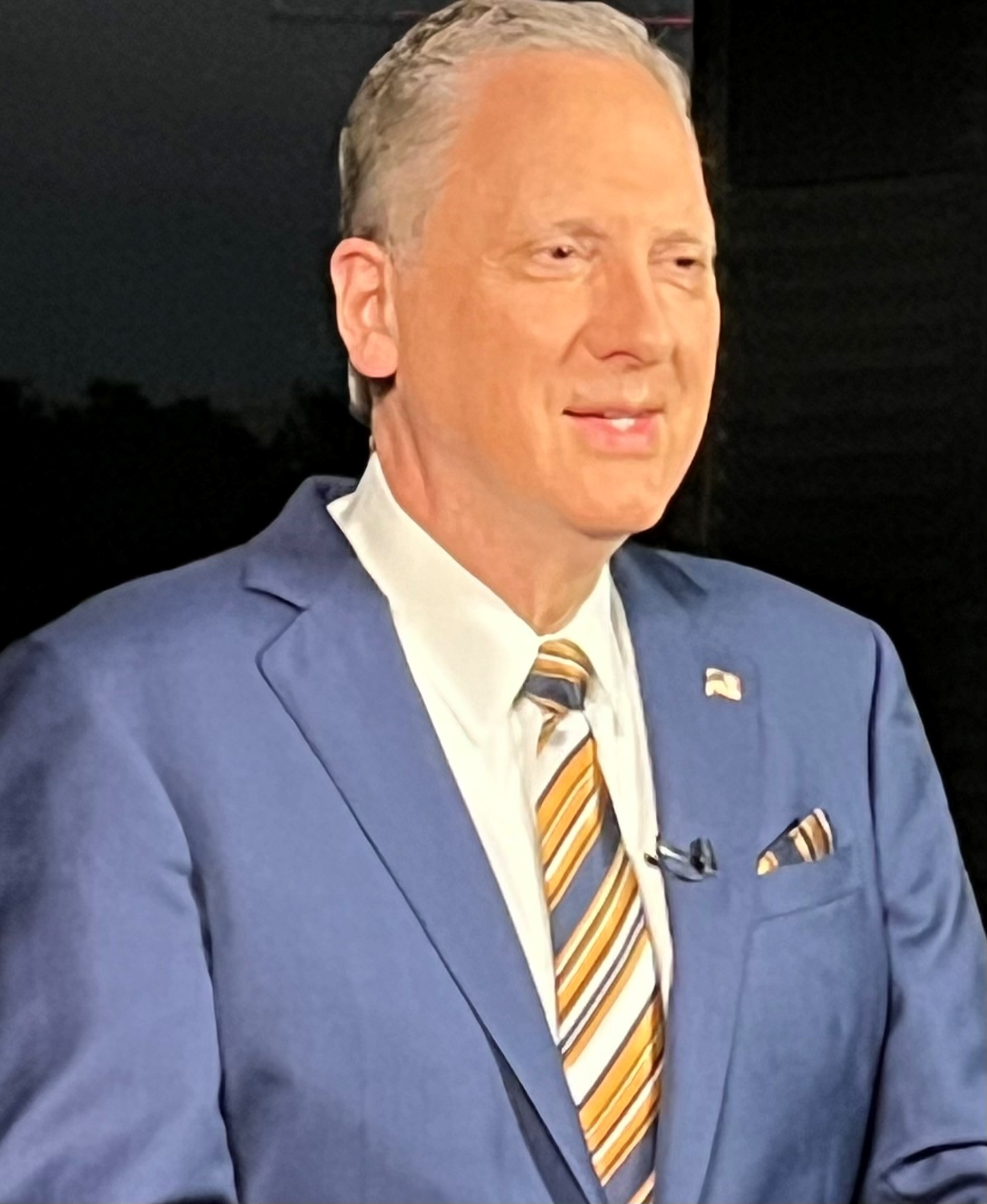
Chuck DeVore in studio in Austin, Texas for a Fox News appearance in 2024

The Crisis of the House Never United: A Novel of Early America in 2022.

The Texas Model: Prosperity in the Lone Star State and Lessons for America in 2013. A new edition of the book was published in 2014:

Co-authored China Attacks in 2000, Chinese language edition published in 2001.

== Electoral history ==
=== As State Assemblyman ===
Republican primary results, March 2, 2004
Party	Candidate	Votes	%
Republican	Chuck DeVore	25,248	46.3
Republican	Cristi Cristich	14,363	26.3
Republican	Donald P. Wagner	8,146	14.9
Republican	Marianne Zippi	4,501	8.3
Republican	Long K. Pham	1,709	3.1
Republican	Chonchol D. Gupta	544	1.0

Assemblyman 70th district, November 2, 2004
Party	Candidate	Votes	%
Republican	Chuck DeVore	112,844	61.1
Democratic	Carl Mariz	65,351	35.4
Libertarian	Mark Baldwin	6,506	3.5

Assemblyman 70th district, November 7, 2006
Party	Candidate	Votes	%
Republican	Chuck DeVore (Incumbent)	78,724	60.5
Democratic	Michael G. Glover	51,453	39.5

Assemblyman 70th district, November 4, 2008
Party	Candidate	Votes	%
Republican	Chuck DeVore (Incumbent)	114,556	57.8
Democratic	Michael G. Glover	83,709	42.2

=== As U.S. Senate Candidate ===
Republican primary results, June 8, 2010
Party	Candidate	Votes	%
Republican	Carly Fiorina	1,315,429	56.4
Republican	Tom Campbell	504,289	21.7
Republican	Chuck DeVore	452,577	19.3
Republican	Al Ramirez	42,149	1.8
Republican	Tim Kalemkarian	19,598	0.8

California Assembly
Preceded by John Campbell	California State Assemblyman; 70th District; December 6, 2004–November 30, 2010	Succeeded by Donald Wagner
