= Adjutant General of Kansas =

State agency in Kansas, United States

The Adjutant General of Kansas is the highest-ranking military official in the State of Kansas and is subordinate to the Governor of Kansas. The Adjutant General is a member of the Governor's Cabinet and advises the Governor on military and emergency management matters. The Adjutant General runs the day-to-day administration of the Kansas Adjutant General's Department, including the Kansas National Guard.

== Appointment ==
The Governor appoints, subject to confirmation by the Kansas Senate, the Adjutant General with the rank of major general. The person appointed must have served at least five years as a commissioned officer in the Kansas National Guard and have served as an officer in the armed forces of the United States. The Governor may promote, subject to confirmation by the Senate any Adjutant General who has served at least 15 consecutive years to the rank of lieutenant general. The Adjutant General serves at the pleasure of the Governor.

== Duties ==
The Adjutant General is the principal military advisor to the Governor and is also responsible for the organization, training and supervision of the Kansas National Guard. In addition, the Adjutant General is the Director of the Kansas Division of Emergency Management and the head of Kansas Homeland Security. The Office of the Adjutant General also provides administrative services to the Kansas Wing of the Civil Air Patrol.

== Staff ==
The Adjutant General's staff is headquartered in Topeka, Kansas and oversees the operation of many installations throughout the state.

- The Kansas National Guard consists of approximately 6,600 soldiers and airmen of the Kansas Army National Guard and the Kansas Air National Guard.
- The Kansas Division of Emergency Management is responsible for emergency management of all disasters and coordination of recovery and response activities statewide. As a part of the Adjutant General responsibilities as Director of Kansas Homeland Security, KDEM also focuses on preparedness for prevention of acts of terrorism.

=== Kansas Army National Guard ===
The Kansas Army National Guard is the land component of the Kansas National Guard and is composed of approximately 4,400 soldiers assigned at installations throughout the state.

- Headquarters and Headquarters Detachment, Joint Forces Headquarters, Topeka
- 287th Sustainment Brigade, Wichita
- 35th Division Tactical Command Post, Fort Leavenworth
- 235th Regiment, Salina
- 69th Troop Command, Topeka
- 635th Regional Support Group, Hutchinson

=== Kansas Air National Guard ===
The Kansas Air National Guard is the air component of the Kansas National Guard and is composed of a headquarters component located at Topeka, Kansas and two main units: the 184th Intelligence Wing, located at Wichita, Kansas and the 190th Air Refueling Wing located at Topeka. There are approximately 2,200 airmen assigned in all locations.

=== Kansas Division of Emergency Management ===
The logo of the Kansas Division of Emergency Management

KDEM is the branch of the Adjutant General's Department that deals with mitigation advocacy, planning requirements and guidance, training and exercising, response coordination, and administration of recovery programs for the civil sector on the State of Kansas regardless of the type of hazard. It was created in 1950 in response to Cold War nuclear threats as the State Civil Defense Agency and was transferred to the Adjutant General's Department in 1955. At that time its role was expanded to include emergency management for all disasters and coordination of recovery and response activities statewide.

=== Kansas Homeland Security ===
This branch coordinates activities in the State of Kansas dealing with the prevention and protection from terrorist related activities including response and recovery from terrorist acts.

=== Kansas Volunteer Department of the Civil Air Patrol ===
The Volunteer Department was created to administer state funds allocated to the Civil Air Patrol and was placed under the control of the Adjutant General's Department by state law in 1997 for the administrative support and control of state resources and funding used by the Kansas Wing of the Civil Air Patrol.

== History ==
=== List of Adjutants General of the State of Kansas ===
Term	Name
August 31, 1855 to January 1858	Adjutant General Hiram J. Strickler
May 2, 1861 to June 20, 1861	Brig. Gen. Robert B. Mitchell
June 23, 1861 to March 22, 1862	Brig. Gen. Lyman Allen
March 22, 1862 to February 26, 1863	Brig. Gen. Charles Chadwick
February 27, 1863 to May 2, 1864	Brig. Gen. Guilford Dudley
May 2, 1864 to March 31, 1865	Col. Cyrus K. Holliday
April 1, 1865 to August 18, 1867	Col. Thomas J. Anderson
August 18, 1867 to March 3, 1869	Col. Josiah B. McAfee
March 4, 1869 to March 4, 1870	Col. William S. Moorhouse
March 5, 1870 to March 5, 1873	Col. David Whittaker
March 6, 1873 to March 2, 1876	Col. Charles A. Morris
March 2, 1876 to March 5, 1878	Col. Hiram T. Beman
April 8, 1878 to January 7, 1883	Col. Peter S. Noble
January 8, 1883 to January 22, 1885	Col. Thomas Moonlight
January 23, 1885 to March 31, 1889	Col. Alexander B. Campbell
April 1, 1889 to January 1, 1893	Col. John N. Roberts
January 10, 1893 to March 31, 1894	Col. Henry H. Artz
April 1, 1894 to February 28, 1895	Col. Albert J. Davis
March 1, 1895 to January 31, 1897	Brig. Gen. Simeon M. Fox
February 1, 1897 to February 21, 1899	Col. Hiram Allen
February 22, 1899 to February 1, 1903	Brig. Gen. Simeon M. Fox
February 1, 1903 to March 31, 1905	Brig. Gen. Samuel H. Kelsey
April 1, 1905 to March 31, 1909	Brig. Gen. James W. F. Hughes
April 1, 1909 to September 30, 1917	Maj. Gen. Charles I. Martin
October 1, 1917 to January 27, 1919	Brig. Gen. Charles S. Huffman
January 27, 1919 to January 11, 1923	Brig. Gen. Charles I. Martin
January 11, 1923 to February 10, 1925	Brig. Gen. R. Neill Rahn
February 10, 1925 to April 27, 1951	Brig. Gen. Milton R. McLean
April 21, 1951 to December 31, 1972	Lt. Gen. Joe Nickell
January 1, 1973 to September 30, 1980	Maj. Gen. Edward R. Fry
October 1, 1980 to October 17, 1987	Maj. Gen. Ralph T. Tice
October 18, 1987 to November 30, 1990	Maj. Gen. Philip B. Finley
December 1, 1990 to February 10, 1999	Maj. Gen. James F. Rueger
February 10, 1999 to October 31, 2003	Maj. Gen. Gregory B. Gardner
January 5, 2004 to January 8, 2011	Maj. Gen. Tod M. Bunting
January 28, 2011 to April 2, 2020	Maj. Gen. Lee Tafanelli
April 3, 2020 to April 1, 2023	Maj. Gen. David A. Weishaar
April 1, 2023 to present	Maj. Gen. Michael T. Venerdi

== See also ==
- Kansas State Cabinet
- Kansas State Guard

== Notes ==
Citations

References used

- "2013 Annual Report Kansas Adjutant General's Department" (pdf). Kansas Adjutant General's Department. State of Kansas.
