= Steve Lukert =

American politician

Member of the Kansas House of Representatives from the 62nd district
- In office January 3, 2006 – January 10, 2011
- Preceded by: Bruce Larkin
- Succeeded by: Randy Garber

Personal details
- Born: December 10, 1947 (age 78)
- Party: Democratic
- Spouse: Linda
- Children: 5

Steve Lukert (December 10, 1947) is a former Democratic member of the Kansas House of Representatives, who represented the 62nd district. He served from January 3, 2006 - 2011. Lukert ran for re-election in 2010, but lost to Republican Randy Garber.

Lukert retired from teaching after 32 years, and has been a farmer for 40 years. He and wife Linda have five children and 10 grandchildren.

== Committee membership ==
- Taxation
- Agriculture and Natural Resources Budget
- Agriculture and Natural Resources
- Joint Committee on State-Tribal Relations

== Major donors ==
The top 5 donors to Lukert's 2008 campaign were mostly from professional associations:

- 1. NRA Political Victory Fund $1,000
- 2. Kansas National Education Association $1,000
- 3. Kansas Contractors Association $1,000
- 4. Kansas Association of Realtors $900
- 5. Kansas Bankers Association $750
