= Cyrus K. Holliday =

American railroad executive (1826–1900)

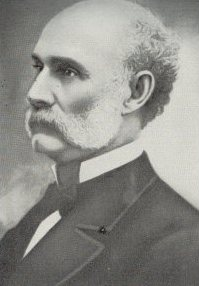

Mayor of Topeka
- In office 1869–1870
- Preceded by: Orin T. Welch
- Succeeded by: Rev. J. B. McAfee
- In office 1867–1868
- Preceded by: Ross Burns
- Succeeded by: Orin T. Welch
- In office 1859–1860
- Preceded by: Lorenzo Dow
- Succeeded by: Hiram W. Farnsworth

Personal details
- Born: Cyrus Kurtz Holliday; April 3, 1826 Kidderminster, Pennsylvania, U.S.
- Died: March 29, 1900 (aged 73) Topeka, Kansas, U.S.
- Spouse: Mary Dillon Jones
- Children: Lillie Holliday; Charles King Holliday
- Parent(s): David Holliday; Mary (Kennedy) Holliday
- Occupation: Railroad executive

Colonel Cyrus Kurtz Holliday (April 3, 1826 – March 29, 1900) was an American railroad executive who was one of the founders of the township of Topeka, Kansas, in the mid 19th century; and was Adjutant General of Kansas during the American Civil War. The title Colonel, however, was honorary. He was the first president of the Atchison, Topeka and Santa Fe Railway, as well as one of the railroad's directors for nearly 40 years, up to 1900. A number of railway locomotives have been named after him, as well as the former town of Holliday, Kansas. He was also the Deputy Grand Master of the Grand Lodge A.F. & A.M. of Kansas. As a Freemason, he was a member of Topeka Lodge #17 and was highly influential in the decision of moving the State Capitol to the city of Topeka.

== Education and early career ==
He was born on April 3, 1826, to David and Mary (Kennedy) Holliday, in Kidderminster, Pennsylvania (near Carlisle). The younger Holliday received a public school education, graduating from Allegheny College in Meadville, Pennsylvania, where he studied law, in 1852. Although he moved to Kansas in 1854, Allegheny College's alumni records show Holliday receiving a master's degree in 1855.

While he was still in Meadville, he was asked to prepare legal documentation for a new railroad that would connect to the city. The proposed railroad (likely the Pittsburgh and Erie Railroad which was sometimes known as "The Meadville Line") would almost connect with a larger nearby system (the Atlantic and Great Western Railroad), which meant that it could become a feeder route to the larger railroad. Holliday saw the potential of the line and instead of asking for a standard fee to create the documents, he asked for and was granted a partnership in the new railroad. When this railroad was purchased by the larger system, Holliday earned $20,000 from the sale.

After the sale was completed, he married Mary Dillon Jones. He soon followed the many others making the migration to settle land west of the Mississippi River, but Mary stayed behind in Pennsylvania. The two were reunited later in Kansas after the births of their children, Lillie and Charles King.

== Founding Topeka and military service ==
In 1854 he moved to Kansas, leaving his wife behind in Pennsylvania to follow later. He first settled in Lawrence in October 1854. On December 10, 1854, after helping to find a location for the new townsite of Topeka, he wrote a letter to his wife saying:

I am now thirty miles above Lawrence on the Kansas River assisting in starting a new town. We are just about in the central portion of the "settled" Territory and with perhaps the best landing and the most eligible site for a city in the entire country. ... So I think it must be, and in a few years when civilization by its magic influence shall have transformed this glorious country from what it is now to the brilliant destiny awaiting it, the Sun in all his course will visit no land more truly lovely and desirable than this. Here, Mary, with God's kind permission, we will make our home; and I have every reason to believe a home it will truly be.

In 1855 Holliday received the honorary title of Colonel for supervising a regiment during the Wakarusa War. He also served as the Adjutant General of Kansas during the Civil War from May 2, 1864, to March 31, 1865. Although his Colonel title was only honorary, he continued to use it long after his military service.

In 1861, Holliday served in the Kansas State Senate, and although he ran for Congress in 1874, he was defeated in that election. He was a Republican.

Holliday had broad interests in developing the natural resources of Kansas. In the 1890s he became mistakenly convinced that Ellis and Trego counties in central Kansas contained mineral deposits of tin, zinc, and gold. In 1899 his son Charles K. Holliday founded Smoky Hill City, Kansas, near the supposed mineral deposits.

== Santa Fe Railroad ==
Once Topeka was founded, it needed transportation to connect it to the rest of the country. Holliday's legal skills were called on again to create the paperwork for a new railroad. In 1859 he singlehandedly wrote the charter for the Atchison and Topeka Railroad Company, which would connect the two cities by rail following the route of the Santa Fe Trail. Kansas Territory governor Samuel Medary approved the charter on February 11, 1859. Holliday was named a director and president of the new railroad on September 17, 1860, which was renamed in 1863 to the Atchison, Topeka and Santa Fe Railroad. During his tenure as president, Holliday secured land grants from the federal government that would soon be used by the railroad to populate the western portion of Kansas in order to build a customer base for the railroad. He stepped down from the presidency at the end of 1863, but remained on the board of directors until July 27, 1865. He rejoined the board on September 24, 1868, this time serving until his death on March 29, 1900.

== Legacy ==
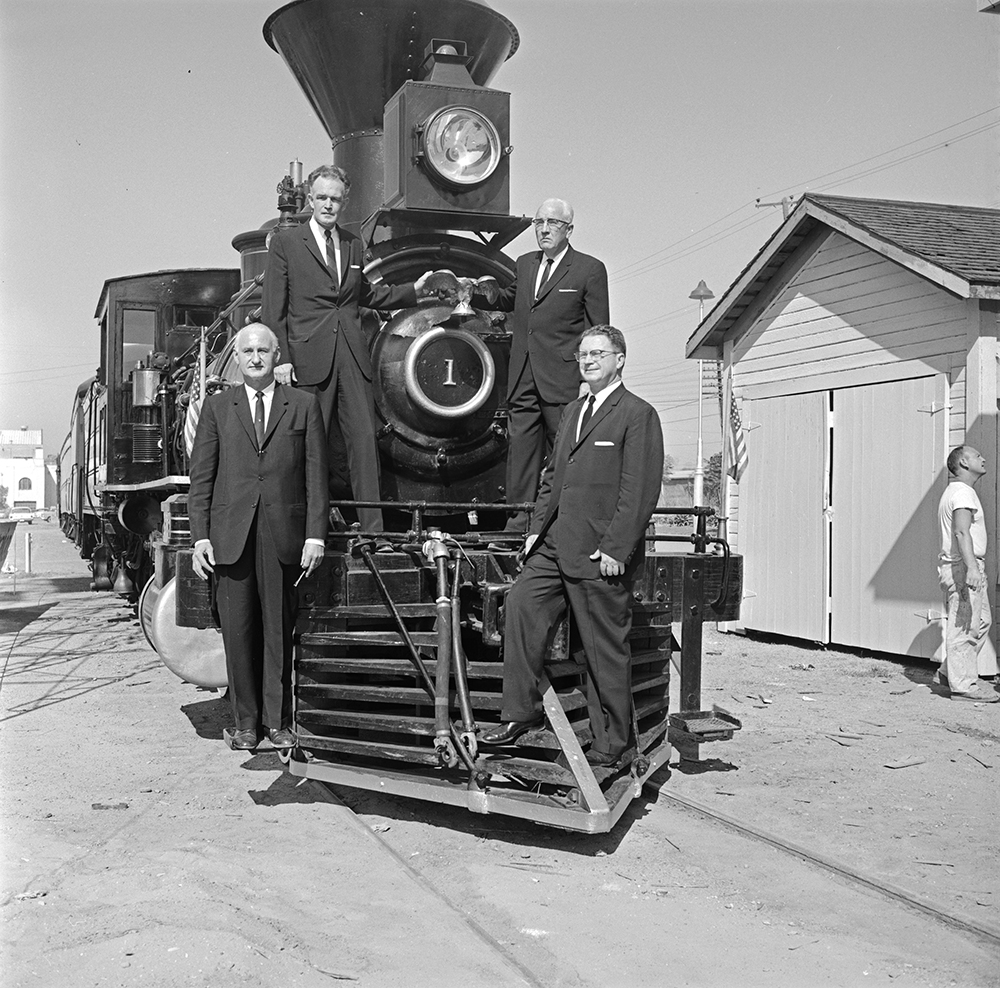
Officials of the Atchison, Topeka, & Santa Fe, on the line's Cyrus K. Holliday Locomotive No. 1

Holliday is memorialized for his contributions to Kansas and the Santa Fe:

- Cyrus K. Holliday, Locomotive #1, a vintage locomotive was displayed by the AT&SF into the 1960s. The locomotive is now preserved in the Kansas History Museum as Santa Fe No. 132.
- He is portrayed in the 1940 movie "Santa Fe Trail" by Henry O'Neill as a promoter of commerce and development in the American West of his time.
- In World War II, the United States Liberty ship SS Cyrus K. Holliday was named in his honor.
- Locomotive #1 on the Disneyland Railroad in the Disneyland Resort bore the name "C.K. Holliday" since the park's opening in 1955.
- Locomotive #2 of the Disneyland Railroad in Disneyland Paris was also named "C.K. Holliday" in his honor.
- In 1960, he was inducted into the Hall of Great Westerners of the National Cowboy & Western Heritage Museum.
- The Cyrus Hotel in Topeka was named in his honor

New title	President of the Atchison, Topeka and Santa Fe Railway; 1860 – 1863	Succeeded by Samuel C. Pomeroy
