= Lee Tafanelli =

American politician

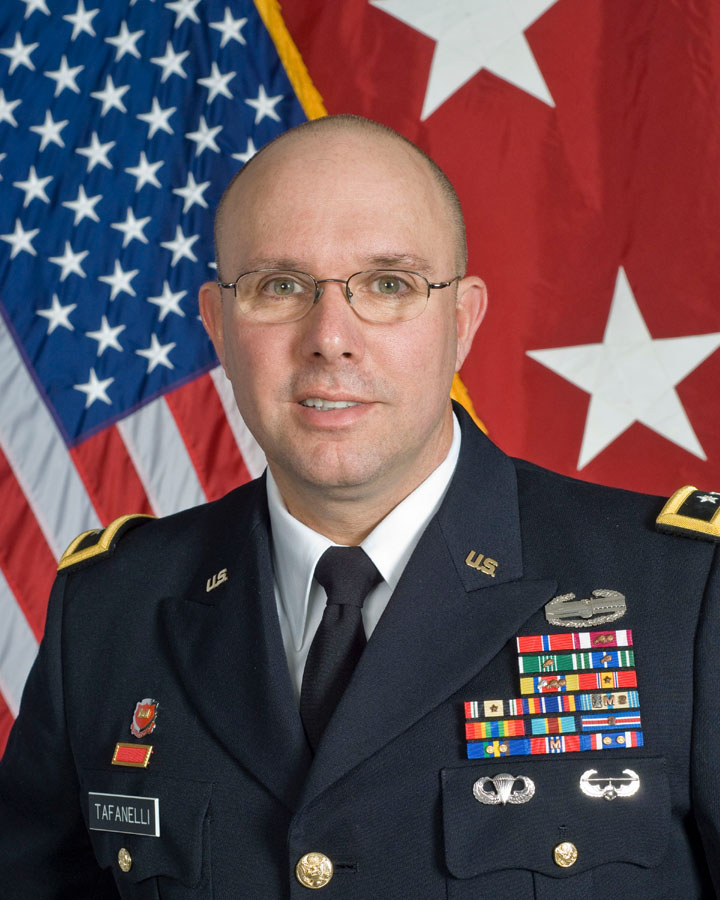

Adjutant General of Kansas
- In office January 28, 2011 – April 2, 2020
- Preceded by: Tod Bunting
- Succeeded by: David Weishaar

Member of the Kansas House of Representatives from the 47th district
- In office January 9, 2006 – January 10, 2011
- Preceded by: Joann Flower
- Succeeded by: Ramon Gonzalez Jr.
- In office January 8, 2001 – January 2004
- Preceded by: Joann Flower
- Succeeded by: Joann Flower

Personal details
- Born: March 9, 1961 (age 65) Capaldo, Kansas, U.S.
- Party: Republican
- Spouse: Tammy
- Education: Pittsburg State University; Kansas State University; United States Army War College

Military service
- Allegiance: United States of America
- Branch/service: Kansas Army National Guard
- Years of service: 1980–present
- Rank: Major general

Lee E. Tafanelli (born March 3, 1961) is an American National Guardsman who, serving as the Adjutant General of Kansas from 2011 to 2020. He is a former Republican member of the Kansas House of Representatives, representing the 47th district.

== Career ==
=== Politics ===
Tafanelli was a Republican member of the Kansas House of Representatives, representing the 47th district. He first served from 2001 to 2004. Following a yearlong deployment in 2005 in support of Operation Iraqi Freedom, he served from 2006 until his resignation January 10, 2011, when he was appointed Adjutant General of Kansas by Governor Sam Brownback.

==== Committee membership ====
- Transportation and Public Safety Budget (Chair)
- Appropriations
- Vision 2020
- Veterans, Military and Homeland Security
- Joint Committee on Kansas Security

==== Major donors ====
The top 5 donors to Tafanelli's 2008 campaign:

- 1. Tafanelli, Lee $1,750
- 2. Koch Industries $1,000
- 3. Kansas Medical Society $1000
- 4. Kansas Contractors Association $1000
- 5. Wal-Mart $900

=== Military ===
On January 28, 2011, Tafanelli was sworn in as the Adjutant General of Kansas, the military commander of the Kansas National Guard, and was promoted to major general. Previously he served as assistant adjutant general-Army, Kansas Army National Guard.

Tafanelli joined the Kansas Army National Guard in 1980 and receiving his commission as a second lieutenant in the Corps of Engineers through Army ROTC at Pittsburg State University in 1982.

While serving as commander of the 891st Engineer Battalion, he led the battalion on its deployment to Iraq for Operation Iraqi Freedom in 2005. Later, he commanded the 69th Troop Command and was director of operations for the Kansas National Guard.

Tafanelli has served at the Department of the Army level, as military assistant to the Assistant Secretary of the Army (Manpower and Reserve Affairs) in support of Operation Noble Eagle and Operation Enduring Freedom.

Military offices
Preceded by Tod Bunting	Adjutant General of Kansas; January 28, 2011 – April 2, 2020	Incumbent
