= Vitasound =

Vitasound was an experimental sound system developed by Warner Brothers in 1939. It was intended to provide a wider sound source and greater dynamic range for music and effects than standard soundtracks of the period. But unlike the near-contemporary Fantasound system used for the roadshow release of Walt Disney's 'Fantasia' it was not a stereophonic system.

In order to achieve a wider sound source and greater dynamic range the Vitasound system employed additional left and right loudspeakers which could be switched in parallel with the normal center loudspeaker, and a variable-gain amplifier which could increase the replay volume by up to 10dB. Both the loudspeaker switching and the gain of the variable-gain amplifier were under the control of a control track recorded on the Vitasound print.

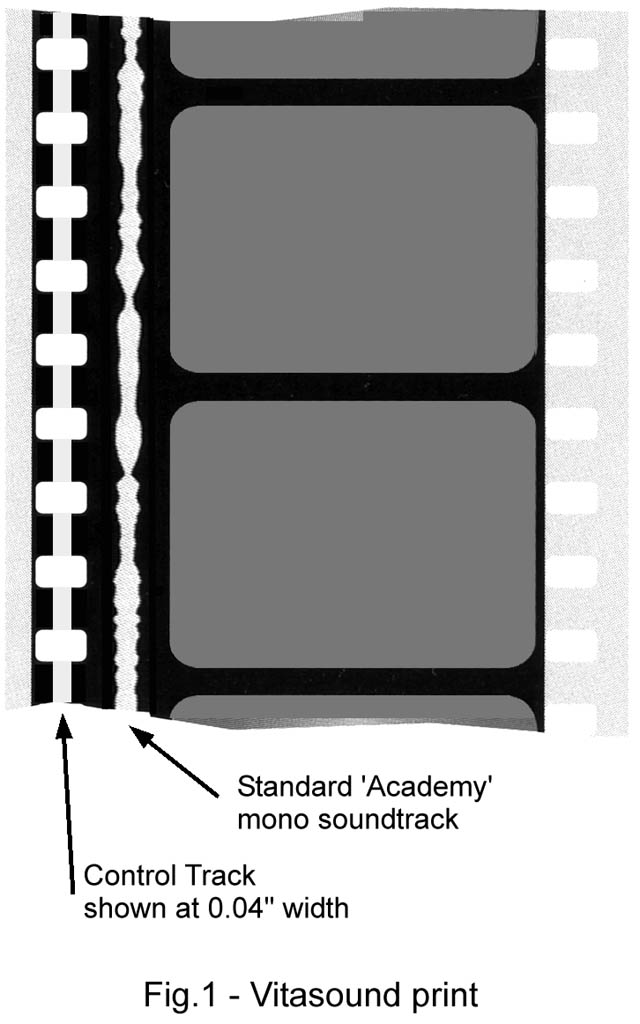

In all other respects the Vitasound print conformed to a standard 35mm release print of the day, with a standard "Academy" mono soundtrack in the normal position. Hence the Vitasound print could be played on a standard unmodified theater sound projector, though without the greater dynamic range of playback via Vitasound equipment.

The control track consisted of a clear line on a dark background in the spaces between the sprocket holes on the soundtrack side of the film (i.e. in the spaces now used for the data packets on Dolby SR-D prints). It was scanned by an additional optical track reader that scanned a portion of film 0.09" (2.3mm) wide along the line of the sprocket holes. The alternating sprocket holes and dark film produced a 96 Hz signal from the track reader, the amplitude of which depended on the average density of the film between the sprocket holes and thus on the control track width.

After amplification this 96 Hz signal was rectified to produce a DC control voltage inversely proportional to the track width. This control voltage in turn was fed to two units: the first was a threshold circuit that operated a relay when the control voltage reached a value corresponding to a track width of 0.04" (1mm), this relay connected the left and right loudspeakers in parallel with the normal theater loudspeaker.

The second was the variable gain amplifier so arranged that until the control voltage reached the value corresponding to a track width of 0.04" the amplifier gain was held constant at 0dB, But as the control voltage increased further the amplifier gain increased until, at a control voltage corresponding to a zero track width, the amplifier gain was 10dB.

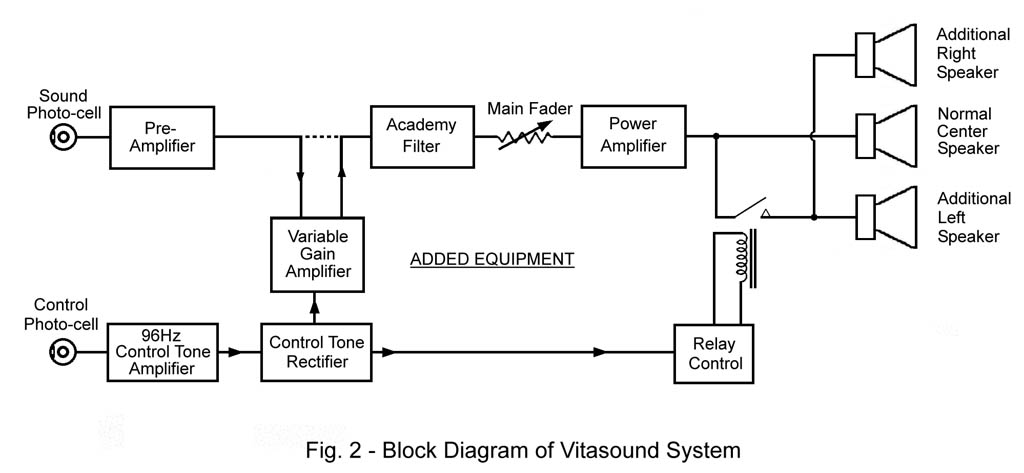

The additional apparatus required for Vitasound was relatively modest: two additional loudspeakers, the variable-gain amplifier and relay unit, and a reader for the control track which was a fairly easy retrofit to existing 35mm projectors. There were no changes in operating compared to showing a standard film, and prints, which cost no more to make than standard ones, were compatible with theaters not equipped for Vitasound. So in other circumstances Vitasound might well have become the de facto standard for release prints just as Dolby Stereo was to become 4 decades later.

But Vitasound was trialled just as the US entered WW2 and by the time normal conditions were restored after the war "magnetic" had become the new buzz-word in sound recording. Most industry experts at the time assumed, wrongly as it turned out, that the future of theatrical reproduction of movie sound would be in the adoption of magnetic recording techniques.

As it was Vitasound was used for only two films: 'Santa Fe Trail' and 'Four Wives'. Like Fantasound it became just a footnote in the history of movie theater sound.
