= Robin Leach (politician) =

American politician

Robin D. Leach

Member of the Kansas House of Representatives from the 47th district
- In office 1981–1988
- Preceded by: Richard Cameron
- Succeeded by: Joann Flower

Member of the Kansas House of Representatives from the 46th district
- In office 1977–1980
- Preceded by: John D. Bower
- Succeeded by: Betty Jo Charlton

Personal details
- Born: September 21, 1939 Lawrence, Kansas
- Died: June 16, 2012 Kansas City, Kansas
- Party: Democratic
- Spouse: Lana McCarter (m. July 31, 1959)

Robin D. Leach (September 21, 1939–June 16, 2012) was an American politician who served as a Democratic member of the Kansas House of Representatives, from 1977 to 1988.
