= Santa Fe Trail (film) =

1940 film

- Theatrical release poster
- Directed by: Michael Curtiz
- Written by: Robert Buckner
- Produced by: Hal B. Wallis (executive producer)
- Starring: Errol Flynn; Olivia de Havilland; Raymond Massey; Ronald Reagan; Alan Hale
- Cinematography: Sol Polito
- Edited by: George Amy
- Music by: Max Steiner
- Production company: Warner Bros. Pictures
- Distributed by: Warner Bros. Pictures
- Release dates: December 13, 1940 (Santa Fe, New Mexico, premiere); December 20, 1940 (New York City)
- Running time: 110 minutes
- Country: United States
- Language: English
- Budget: $1,115,000
- Box office: $2,533,000

Santa Fe Trail.

Santa Fe Trail is a 1940 American historical drama film directed by Michael Curtiz and starring Errol Flynn (as J. E. B. "Jeb" Stuart), Olivia de Havilland, Raymond Massey (as John Brown), Ronald Reagan (as George Armstrong Custer) and Alan Hale. Written by Robert Buckner, the film focuses largely on the abolitionist John Brown and his controversial campaign against slavery before the American Civil War. In a subplot, Jeb Stuart and George Armstrong Custer—who are depicted fictionally as friends from the same West Point graduating class—compete for the hand of de Havilland portraying a fictional character called Kit Carson Holliday.

The film ranked among the higher grossing films of the year and was the seventh Flynn–de Havilland collaboration. Its content has little relevance to the actual Santa Fe Trail, and the script took multiple liberties with the historical record.

== Plot ==
At West Point Military Academy in 1854, Cadet Carl Rader (Van Heflin), an agent of John Brown, is dishonorably discharged for distributing anti-slavery pamphlets, in violation of the U.S. Army's prohibition on pursuing ideological causes while serving. Rader's classmates Jeb Stuart (Errol Flynn) and George Custer (Ronald Reagan) are commissioned as second lieutenants and posted to Fort Leavenworth, Kansas Territory. Custer and Stuart both fall in love with Kit (Olivia de Havilland), the daughter of Cyrus K. Holliday who is building the railroad to Santa Fe, New Mexico. The Kansas Territory is bloodstained and war-torn in the wake of John Brown's (Raymond Massey) crusade against slavery.

Brown's army, which has been terrorizing the countryside and freeing slaves, includes Rader who serves as a mercenary and military advisor. Stuart and Custer's cavalry defend a freight wagon from attack by Brown's forces, and capture Brown's wounded son Jason (Gene Reynolds). Before he dies, Jason betrays his father's hideout at Shubel Morgan's ranch in Palmyra. Stuart rides into Palmyra, the center of the Underground Railroad, in disguise but Brown's men spot his horse's army brand and take him to Brown at gunpoint. Stuart is trapped in a burning barn during an escape attempt, but Custer's cavalry arrives to rescue him. Brown goes into exile.

Three years later, in 1859, the federal government believes Brown's force has been eradicated and Stuart and Custer are promoted and sent to Washington, D.C. Stuart proposes marriage to Kit. Rader, who has not been paid by Brown for his services, arrives in Washington with distressing news: Brown is reopening his campaign to free the enslaved by raiding the federal arsenal at Harper's Ferry, Virginia and raising an army of freed slaves. Colonel Robert E. Lee leads federal forces to Virginia, recaptures the arsenal, and crushes the rebellion. Brown is tried for treason by the state of Virginia and hanged, prophesying from the gallows that only a bloody civil war will settle the issue of slavery in the Union. The movie ends with the marriage of Stuart and Kit aboard one of her father's trains.

== Cast ==
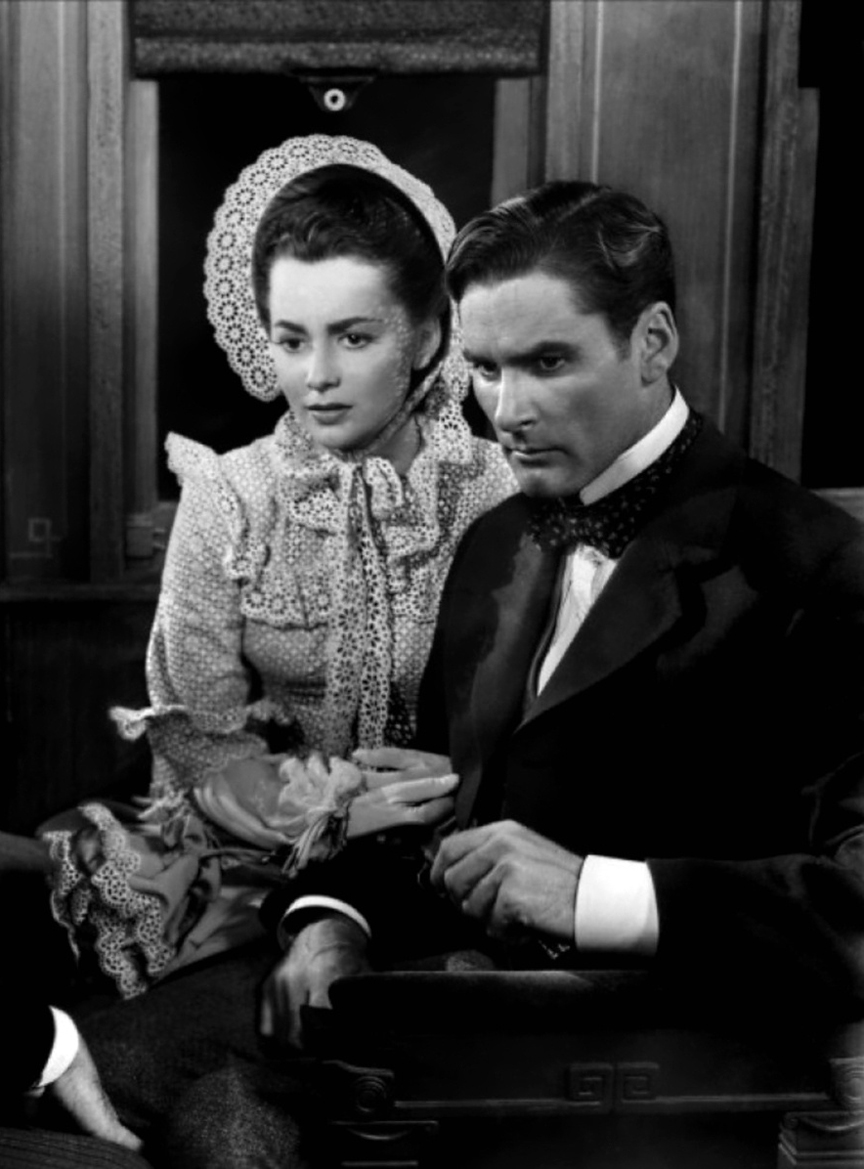
Olivia de Havilland and Errol Flynn in Santa Fe Trail.

- Errol Flynn as James Ewell Brown "Jeb" Stuart
- Olivia de Havilland as Kit Carson Holliday
- Raymond Massey as John Brown
- Ronald Reagan as George Armstrong Custer
- Alan Hale as Tex Bell
- William Lundigan as Bob Holliday
- Van Heflin as Carl Rader
- Gene Reynolds as Jason Brown
- Henry O'Neill as Cyrus K. Holliday
- Guinn "Big Boy" Williams as Windy Brody
- Alan Baxter as Oliver Brown
- Moroni Olsen as Robert E. Lee
- Ward Bond as Townley
- Erville Alderson as Jefferson Davis
- David Bruce as Phil Sheridan
- Spencer Charters as Conductor
- Creighton Hale as Telegraph Operator (uncredited)
- Jack Mower as Surveyor (uncredited)

== Production ==
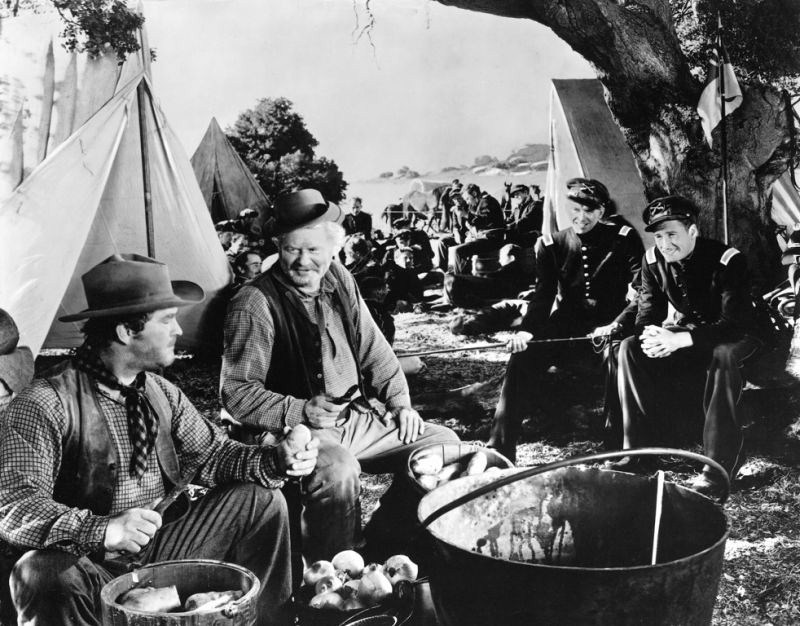
Guinn "Big Boy" Williams, Alan Hale Sr., Ronald Reagan and Errol Flynn.

=== Casting ===
The film was based on a script by Robert Buckner. At one stage, Randolph Scott was mentioned for the lead. However, by April 1940 it had become a vehicle for Errol Flynn and Olivia de Havilland.

Raymond Massey signed to play John Brown in June.

John Wayne was mentioned as a possibility for Flynn's costar. Dennis Morgan was announced for the role of George Custer. Morgan was borrowed to appear in Kitty Foyle and replaced by Ronald Reagan before filming began. Van Heflin was signed to play the villain following his success on Broadway in The Philadelphia Story; it was his first movie since 1937.

=== Shooting ===
In June 1940, Warner Bros. announced the film as part of its slate. It was one of five films the studio announced for Flynn, the others being The Constant Nymph, Captain Horatio Hornblower, Shanghai, and Jupiter Laughs.

Filming started in July 1940, delayed by a recurrence of Flynn's malaria.

Outdoor scenes were filmed at the Lasky Movie Ranch in the Lasky Mesa area of the Simi Hills in the western San Fernando Valley, California. The railroad scenes were filmed on the Sierra Railroad in Tuolumne County, California.

== Release ==
=== Premiere ===
The film was premiered in Santa Fe over a three-day festival, featuring a large number of celebrities, including Flynn, De Havilland, Rudy Vallée and Wayne Morris. Rita Hayworth performed a "welcome dance". There were 250 guests and two special trains, one from Hollywood and one from the East, for a total cost of $50,000 — shared between Warners and the Santa Fe Railroad De Havilland was stricken with appendicitis during the trip and had to be flown home.

=== Vitasound ===
In its initial release, Warner Brothers premiered this film in some large cities with an experimental sound system named Vitasound, not stereophonic but aiming to create a greater dynamic sound range for battlefield action and dramatic music.

=== Box office ===
According to Warner Bros records, the film made a profit of $1.48 million. It made $1,748,000 domestically and $785,000 foreign.

The film was released in France in 1947 and recorded 2,147,663 admissions.

== Historical inaccuracies and modern criticism ==
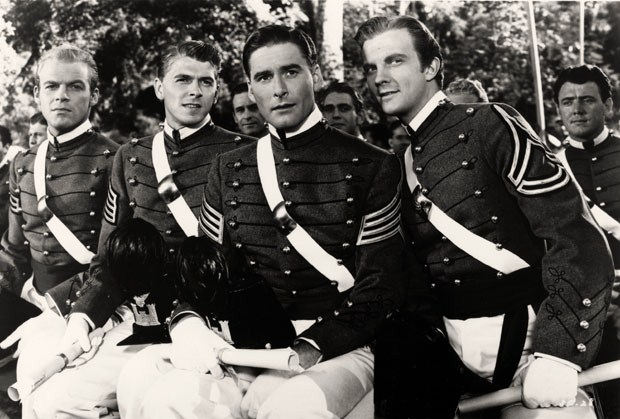
William Marshall as George Pickett, Ronald Reagan as George Armstrong Custer, Errol Flynn as J.E.B. Stuart and William Lundigan

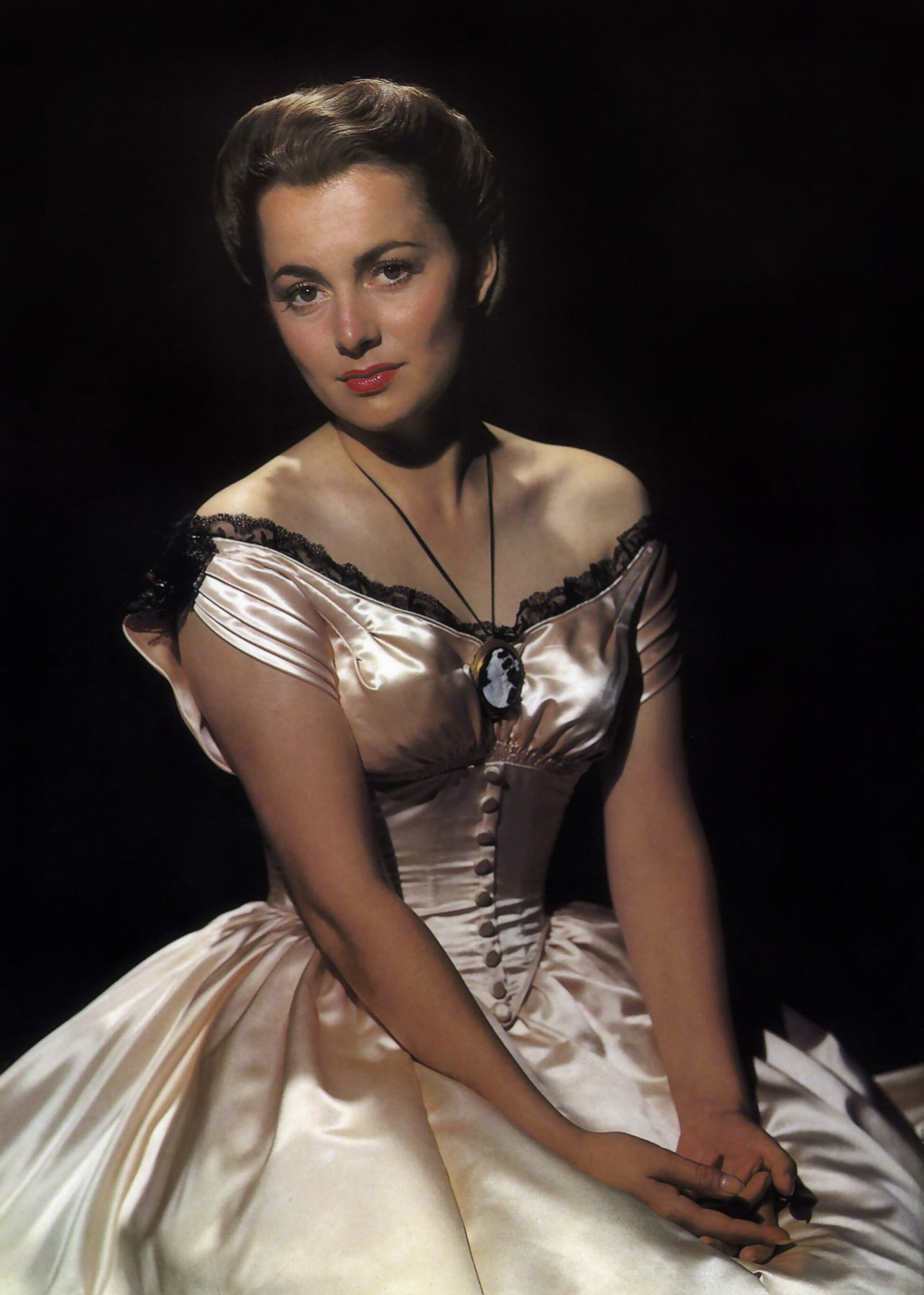
Olivia de Havilland in Santa Fe Trail

There are several major inaccuracies with many of the characters and timeline depicted in the film. First, JEB Stuart, George Custer, and Philip Sheridan, as well as George Pickett, James Longstreet, and John Bell Hood are all depicted as classmates in the same graduating class at West Point and all stationed in the Kansas territory at the same time. In reality they graduated at different times–Stuart in 1854, Custer in 1861, Sheridan and Hood in 1853, Pickett in 1846, and Longstreet in 1842. This depiction of these future Union and Confederate officers adds an element of foreshadowing predicting the coming American Civil War conflict, in which former American officers would be forced to choose sides following Southern secession. Second, future Confederate president Jefferson Davis, who was Secretary of War under Franklin Pierce in 1854 (the time set at the beginning of the film), was not in this Cabinet position by the time of John Brown's raid of Harper's Ferry in 1859. By then, the position was being held by John B. Floyd, a member of the Buchanan administration.

This film takes substantial liberties with other historical facts:

- Stuart and Custer, while they did attend West Point—albeit at different times—and fought against one another at the Battle of Gettysburg, were never personally acquainted.
- Jason Brown did not betray his father to the US Army. He was briefly a prisoner of war, but, after John Brown sought his son's rescue, he arranged for Jason to be exchanged as a POW.
- Jason Brown was not killed in Kansas. One of Brown's other sons, Frederick, was shot by Reverend White.
- Stuart served in the 1st Cavalry Regiment, and Custer served in the 2nd and 5th Cavalry Regiments.
- Custer was never in Kansas Territory; he was stationed there after the Civil War when Kansas had already become a state.
- The character of Carl Rader, expelled from West Point and assisting (later betraying) John Brown, did not exist.
- The U.S. Cavalry did not assault the Harper's Ferry engine house that was occupied by John Brown; it was taken by U.S. Marines who incurred two casualties (one dead, one wounded).
- The railroad into New Mexico was not begun until 1879, 20 years after the fictional events in the film.
- The characters in the film carry Colt Model 1873 Single Action Army revolvers, which did not exist in 1859.
- Jefferson Davis did not have a daughter named Charlotte, who is introduced to George Custer in 1859 in the movie. His daughters were Margaret Howell Davis, who was born in 1855 and thus would have been 4 years old in 1859, and Varina Anne Davis, who was born in 1872.
- Cyrus K. Holliday did not have a son named Bob or a daughter named after Kit Carson. His children were actually named Charles King and Lillie Holliday, respectively. And the maiden name of the real Mrs. "Jeb" Stuart was Flora Cooke.

To this day, some historians describe the figure of John Brown as a monomaniacal zealot, others as a hero for his violent tactics in the name of emancipation. The film depicts the character of John Brown generally as an antagonist, showing the valor of the principles of abolition but criticizing the methods by which Brown pursued his crusade. In the film, Brown eagerly endorses breaking apart the union of the United States and further bloodshed as a means to bringing an end to slavery, ultimately seeing his own demise as a sacrifice made to further the cause of abolition. The movie was made on the eve of the United States' entry into World War II, and its tone and political subtext express a desire to reconcile the nation's dispute over slavery which brought about the American Civil War and appeal to moviegoers in both the Southern and Northern United States. The American Civil War and abolition of slavery are presented as an oncoming tragedy triggered by the actions of an anarchic madman. The film seems to place blame for the outbreak of the Civil War on John Brown and the abolitionists perpetuating the violence of the Pottawatomie Massacre in Bleeding Kansas — but historically there were many other factors, over a much longer period of time. These include the Compromise of 1850, the Fugitive Slave Act, the publication of Uncle Tom's Cabin, the Kansas-Nebraska Act, and the Dred Scott Decision, none of which are addressed in the film. In many scenes, including one with a Native American fortune teller, the heroic protagonists are unable to foresee how the issue of slavery could make them bitter enemies in the near future, even though by mid- to late-1850's hostility between the pro- and anti-slavery states had already reached a boiling point.

To modern viewers, the depiction of some of the black slaves seeking freedom may appear as insensitive or inaccurate in some cases. Many of the black people in the film appear to be passive or dependent on the will of John Brown as an emancipator. Slaves brought by Brown's Underground Railroad to the North seem to be following orders of the abolitionist, without any driving motive of their own to flee slavery. Slaves in Kansas wait to be told they are free by John Brown; he then specifically declares them all free in one scene. Later, several who remain behind after their "emancipation" muse about their days serving masters South in a less than negative light. Trapped in a burning shed, several John Brown's black followers are rescued by Jeb Stuart. One black woman confidently boasts to Jeb Stuart as she's bandaging his wounds. Jeb yelps: "Ouch, that's too tight, Mammy." Mammy retorts: "Don't tell me how to do this, boy! I've been wrapping white folks all my life. When they was babies, I wrapped one end, and when they growed-up and took on too much corn liquor, then I wrapped t'other end!" Jeb laughs: "Ah, what made you leave home?" Mammy: "Well, Old John Brown said he's gonna give us freedom, but shuckins, if this here Kansas is 'freedom', then I got no use for it. No, sir." Then, a black man adds, "Me, neither. I just wants to get back home to Texas and sit till Kingdom Come."

A 2019 review by Filmink magazine stated "This would be the least highly regarded of the 'Dodge City' trilogy. Warners had a strong track record when it came to illustrating the dangers of Nazism, but they were not crash hot on the topic of African-American history. No studio was in 1940 but Santa Fe Trail is especially dodgy."

== Availability ==
Santa Fe Trail entered the public domain in 1968 when United Artists Television (then the owners of the pre-1950 WB library, inherited from Associated Artists Productions) did not renew the copyright. As a result, the film later became widely available on VHS, LaserDisc and DVD as well as freely available for internet downloading.

In 1988, a colorized version was produced by Color Systems Technology for Hal Roach Studios, and released on VHS (VidAmerica, 1990). Turner Entertainment released a higher-quality VHS than was previously available (MGM/UA Home Video, 1998). Turner's ownership is part of the television division of Warner Bros., the original distributor.

Although not fully restored, higher-quality editions have been released in Germany on DVD (Intergroove, 2011) and Blu-ray (WME Home Entertainment, 2017).

== See also ==
- List of films in the public domain in the United States
- List of films featuring slavery
