= USS Gazelle (IX-116) =

United States Navy vessel

History

United States
- Name: Cyrus K. Holliday; Gazelle
- Namesake: Cyrus K. Holliday; The gazelle
- Launched: 9 November 1943
- Commissioned: 29 November 1943
- Decommissioned: 9 May 1946.
- Stricken: 21 May 1946
- Fate: Sold

General characteristics
- Displacement: 14,500 tons
- Length: 441 ft 6 in (134.57 m)
- Beam: 56 ft 11 in (17.35 m)
- Draught: 28 ft 4 in (8.64 m)
- Speed: 11.5 knots
- Complement: 115 officers and men
- Armament: one five-inch (127 mm) gun

USS Gazelle (IX-116), an unclassified miscellaneous vessel, was the third ship of the United States Navy to be named for the gazelle, any of numerous small, graceful, and swift antelopes, with lustrous eyes, found especially in South Africa, northern Africa, Iran, and India. She was built as an auxiliary oiler, launched on 9 November 1943 by the California Shipbuilding Corporation, at Wilmington, Los Angeles, as SS Cyrus K. Holliday sponsored by Mrs. J. E. Stewart, and acquired by the Navy and simultaneously commissioned on 29 November 1943.

Gazelle sailed from Wilmington on 9 January 1944 for Pearl Harbor, where she was assigned to Rear Admiral Turner's Southern Attack Force for the imminent assault on Kwajalein. Underway with the task force 28 January, she entered Kwajalein Lagoon on 2 February 1944 and began fueling operations in the midst of the furious fighting. For two weeks she fueled combatant ships, including battleships New Mexico (BB-40), Mississippi (BB-23), Idaho (BB-42), many cruisers, escort carriers, and smaller warships.

Her mission accomplished, Gazelle stood out 15 February for further combat duties. She steamed into Eniwetok Lagoon on 18 February to support the amphibious invasion of that strategic island. Here in the front line of fighting she fueled several destroyer divisions before sailing 26 February for Kwajalein, where she issued fuel to American warships until getting underway 1 April for Pearl Harbor, arriving 12 April.

One week later she sailed for Majuro, arriving 27 April, and subsequently continued fueling operations and shuttle runs through submarine-infested waters to Majuro, Roi, Kwajalein, and Eniwetok through the summer of 1944, until reaching Ulithi on 15 October. Gazelle escaped damage when Japanese midget submarines penetrated the harbor net and patrol defenses at Ulithi on 20 November and sank oiler Mississinewa, moored 2,000 yards (1,800 m) away. Underway once more on 10 January 1945, the ship reached Palau two days later and served there until arriving Leyte on 28 February. While at Leyte she fueled some 100 Allied ships during the next six months.

Gazelle sailed 13 September for Korea, arriving Jinsen on 28 September, and joined the Korean Service Group, Seventh Fleet. She remained in Korea through October 1945.

Sometime during this period, the Gazelle encountered a typhoon, keeling so far over she almost sank, according to Jere Hamill, one of the ship's officers (in an oral interview with Bruce Edlen, April, 2010).

Gazelle reached Norfolk, Virginia, on 28 February 1946 and decommissioned there on 9 May 1946. Returned to the War Shipping Administration the next day, she was stricken from the Naval Vessel Register on 21 May 1946. In 1948 she was sold to Intercontinental S.S. Corporation and renamed Evistar.

Gazelle earned one battle star for World War II service.
