= Betty Jo Charlton =

American politician

Member of the Kansas House of Representatives from the 44th district
- In office 1980–1980
- Preceded by: Michael Glover
- Succeeded by: Jessie Branson

Member of the Kansas House of Representatives from the 46th district
- In office 1981 – January 9, 1995
- Preceded by: Robin Leach
- Succeeded by: Troy Findley

Personal details
- Born: June 15, 1923 Reno County, Kansas, U.S.
- Died: July 22, 2014 (aged 91) Lawrence, Kansas, U.S.
- Party: Democratic
- Education: University of Kansas

Betty Jo Charlton (June 15, 1923 – July 22, 2014) was an American politician.

Born in Reno County, Kansas, Charlton went to the University of Kansas. She then worked in the Charlton Insurance Agency, where she meet her husband. Charlton served in the Kansas House of Representatives from 1980 until 1994 as a Democrat; she was originally appointed in 1980 to replace Michael Glover, who resigned his seat, and then was re-elected in her own right.

She died in Lawrence, Kansas.
