= Richard Cameron (Kansas politician) =

American politician

Member of the Kansas House of Representatives from the 48th district
- In office 1981–1982
- Preceded by: Francis Gordon
- Succeeded by: Joan Adam

Member of the Kansas House of Representatives from the 47th district
- In office 1979–1980
- Preceded by: Bob Henry
- Succeeded by: Robin Leach

Personal details
- Born: May 29, 1925 Parsons, Kansas
- Died: March 11, 2009
- Party: Republican
- Spouse: Ellen M. Armstrong (m. August 28, 1948)

Richard E. Cameron (May 29, 1925 – March 11, 2009) was an American politician who served for two terms as a Republican member of the Kansas House of Representatives, from 1979 to 1982. He represented the 47th District in the Kansas House for his first term, followed by one term in the 48th district, and resided in Atchison, Kansas.
