= Michael Glover (Kansas politician) =

American politician

Member of the Kansas House of Representatives from the 44th district
- In office 1973–1980
- Succeeded by: Betty Jo Charlton

Personal details
- Born: July 21, 1947
- Party: Democratic

Michael George Glover (born July 21, 1947) is an American former politician.

Glover was originally elected to the Kansas House of Representatives in 1972 while attending law school. He served for eight years before resigning during the 1980 legislative term.

During his time in the legislature, Glover was most well-known for spearheading a bill to lower penalties for possession of marijuana. The bill passed the state House in 1977 on a vote of 65 to 60, but was defeated in the Kansas State Senate after Glover admitted to smoking marijuana himself regularly.

After leaving the state legislature, Glover worked as an attorney and prosecutor in Lawrence, Kansas. In the mid-1980s, he moved to California, where he ran for the California State Assembly in 2006; in that election, he was defeated by incumbent Republican Chuck DeVore by a 61% to 39% margin. Glover ran another race against DeVore in 2008, but was again defeated, 58-42.
