= Randy Garber (politician) =

American politician

Member of the Kansas House of Representatives from the 62nd district
- In office January 10, 2011 – January 13, 2025
- Preceded by: Steve Lukert
- Succeeded by: Sean Willcott

Personal details
- Born: February 27, 1951 (age 75) Axtell, Kansas, U.S.
- Party: Republican
- Spouse: Kay
- Children: 5

Military service
- Allegiance: United States
- Branch/service: United States Navy

Randy Garber (born February 27, 1951) is an American politician who served as a Republican member of the Kansas House of Representatives from 2011 to 2025.

== Biography ==
Garber was born on February 27, 1951, in Axtell, Kansas. He graduated from high school in Sabetha, Kansas. From 1969 to 1989, Garber served in the United States Navy. He and his wife, Kay, have five children between them.

== Political career ==
Garber has been a member of the House of Representatives since 2011. He is a Republican. In 2019, Garber was lead sponsor of a bill that, in "an effort to stop human trafficking and pornography", aims to block online access to pornography, except for adults who have paid a fee. Also in 2019, Garber introduced House Bill 2273, which set minimum setbacks for commercial wind turbines. The bill also required that turbines be equipped with radar technology. He did not seek re-election in 2024.
