= Kansas Department for Aging and Disability Services =

State agency in Kansas, United States

- Great Seal of Kansas

Agency overview
- Formed: July 1, 2012
- Headquarters: New England Building 503 S Kansas Ave Topeka, Kansas 66603
- Agency executive: Timothy Keck, Secretary of Aging and Disability Services
- Website: www.kdads.ks.gov

The Kansas Department for Aging and Disability Services is the second-largest state government agency in Kansas. It is responsible for administering services to older adults, managing the four state hospitals and institutions, and directing health occupations credentialing. The agency was formed on July 1, 2012, as a result of Governor Sam Brownback's executive order that merged the Department of Aging with divisions of the Department for Social and Rehabilitation Services and the Department of Health and Environment.
