= Kansas Department of Health and Environment =

State agency in Kansas, United States

- Great Seal of Kansas

Agency overview
- Headquarters: Curtis State Office Building; 1000 SW Jackson St; Topeka, Kansas 66612
- Agency executive: Lee Norman, Secretary of Health and Environment
- Website: www.kdheks.gov

The Kansas Department of Health and Environment is a state agency in Kansas, responsible for the state's public health system, vital and medical records, and environmental sustainability. The department is also responsible for administering the state's Medicaid program, KanCare, in partnership with the Kansas Department of Aging and Disability Services.
