= Eric Carter (pilot) =

British Royal Air Force pilot (1920–2021)

- Born: 12 February 1920; Bromsgrove, Worcestershire, England
- Died: 26 July 2021 (aged 101) Birmingham, West Midlands, England
- Allegiance: United Kingdom
- Service: Royal Air Force
- Service years: 1939–1946
- Rank: Warrant officer

Eric Carter (12 February 1920 – 26 July 2021) was a British Royal Air Force pilot.

== Early life ==
Eric Carter was born on 12 February 1920 near Bromsgrove in Worcestershire, England.

== World War II ==
Carter joined the Royal Air Force (RAF) in 1939. He said he joined "because the Germans were committing such horrible atrocities". Carter was posted to No. 615 Squadron.

Carter left the RAF in 1946.

Carter was one of only four non-Russians to receive the Order of Lenin, the Soviet Union's highest military honour. In March 2013, Carter was awarded the Arctic Star for his efforts during the war. In September 2014, he was awarded the Medal of Ushakov by the Russian government.

== Post-War ==
In 2012, Carter launched a fundraising campaign to finance the restoration of a Supermarine Spitfire donated to Stoke-on-Trent in 1969.

Carter died at a retirement home in Birmingham, West Midlands, on 26 July 2021.

== Personal life ==
Eric married Phyllis Carter in 1943.
