= Eric Carter (Kansas politician) =

American politician

Member of the Kansas House of Representatives from the 48th district
- In office January 13, 2003 – 2006
- Preceded by: Jerry Henry
- Succeeded by: Marvin Kleeb

Personal details
- Born: February 19, 1972 (age 54)
- Party: Republican
- Spouse: Heather Carter

Eric Carter (born February 19, 1972) is an American politician who served for two terms as a Republican member of the Kansas House of Representatives, from 2003 to 2006. He represented the 48th District in the Kansas House, residing in Overland Park, Kansas.
