= David Kerr (cricketer) =

Australian cricketer

Personal information
- Born: 28 June 1923; Melbourne, Australia
- Died: 16 February 1989 (aged 65); Melbourne, Australia

Domestic team information
- Years: Team
- 1946-1954: Victoria
- Source: Cricinfo, 29 November 2015

David Kerr (28 June 1923 – 16 February 1989) was an Australian cricketer. He played 16 first-class cricket matches for Victoria between 1946 and 1954.

== See also ==
- List of Victoria first-class cricketers
