= Bruce F. Larkin =

American politician (born 1950)

Member of the Kansas House of Representatives from the 62nd district
- In office 1987–2006
- Succeeded by: Steve Lukert

Personal details
- Born: August 25, 1950 (age 76) Seneca, Kansas
- Party: Democratic
- Spouse: Judy
- Children: 3
- Education: Washburn University (BA)
- Profession: Farmer

Bruce F. Larkin (born August 25, 1950) is an American politician and farmer from Kansas. He served nearly 20 years in the Kansas House of Representatives and later as Chief Judge of the Kansas Court of Tax Appeals.

== Early life and education ==
Larkin was born on August 25, 1950. Larkin's family has a long history in Kansas, with his great-grandfather purchasing the farm that Larkin still owns in 1878. He received his bachelor's degree from Washburn University in 1973.

== Political career ==
=== School board ===
Larkin's career in politics began when he was elected and served two terms on the St. Benedict and Baileyville School Board (which later became part of Nemaha Central USD 115) from 1978 to 1986.

=== Kansas House of Representatives ===
Larkin was elected to the Kansas House of Representatives in 1986 and served from 1987 to 2006. During this period, he represented the 62nd district, which includes the Baileyville area. His legislative service included assignments to committees dealing with education, taxation, agriculture, and transportation.

=== Kansas Department of Revenue and Court of Tax Appeals ===
In 1992, Larkin was appointed to the Kansas Department of Revenue's Use Value Advisory Group, which redeveloped agricultural use value formula for the state.

After retiring from the House of Representatives, he was appointed to the Kansas State Board of Tax Appeals in 2007, which was subsequently changed to the Kansas Court of Tax Appeals, where he heard a large number of property tax appeals from throughout the state. Larkin served as Chief Judge of the Court of Tax Appeals from 2009 to 2012.
