= Missouri Department of Economic Development =

State agency of Missouri

Agency overview
- Jurisdiction: Missouri
- Agency executive: Michelle Hataway, Acting Director
- Website: https://ded.mo.gov/

The Missouri Department of Economic Development (DED) is an agency of the government of Missouri. The department was made to support economic growth in Missouri and help local communities to grow and prosper. It is overseen by a department director appointed by the Missouri Governor and confirmed by the Missouri Senate.

== Organization ==
The Department of Economic Development has several different divisions and agencies that work together to promote the economy of Missouri;

=== Divisions ===
- Administrative Division
- Strategy and Performance Division
- Regional Engagement Division
- Missouri One Start Division
- Business and Community Solutions Division
- Missouri Division of Tourism

=== Agencies ===
- Missouri Women's Council
- Broadband Development Office
- Missouri Technology Corporation
- Missouri Development Finance Board
- Missouri Community Service Commission
- Missouri Housing Development Commission
- Missouri Military Preparedness and Enhancement Commission
