= Kansas Department of Administration =

State agency in Kansas, United States

- Great Seal of Kansas

Agency overview
- Headquarters: Curtis State Office Building; 1000 SW Jackson St, Topeka, Kansas 66612
- Annual budget: $69 million
- Ministers responsible: Adam Proffitt, Secretary of Administration; Kraig Knowlton, Deputy Secretary of Management & Director of Personnel Services
- Website: www.da.ks.gov

The Kansas Department of Administration (DoA) is a department of the state of Kansas under the Governor of Kansas. It was created in 1953 by the Kansas Legislature. DoA is administered by the Secretary of Administration, who is appointed by the Governor with the approval of the Kansas Senate. As of 2024, it has about 500 employees.

The current Secretary of Administration is Adam Proffitt, who was appointed by Governor Laura Kelly on January 2, 2023.

== Offices ==
- Office of Accounts and Reports – provides statewide accounting and payroll, as well as financial reporting services
- Office of Chief Counsel – responsible for providing internal legal services to the Department
- Office of Personnel Services – responsible for providing human resources to state agencies
- Office of Printing, Mailing, and Surplus – responsible for providing statewide printing services and managing surplus property
- Office of Procurement and Contracts – responsible for promoting the use and development of processes for the state
- Office of the Secretary – responsible for directing and managing divisions of the Department
- Office of Public Affairs – responsible for internal and external communications for the Department
- Office of Financial Management – responsible for enhancing efficiency of financial systems for the state
- Office of Facilities and Property Management – responsible for asset management and construction services for the state
- Office of Systems Management – responsible for architecture, technical development, and supporting statewide systems of the Department
- State Employee Health Benefits Program – responsible for serving health services to state employees
- Kansas Criminal Justice Information System Committee – responsible providing secure criminal justice information

== See also ==
- General Services Administration
