= Kansas National Guard =

- Seal of the National Guard
- Active: August 30, 1855 – present
- Country: United States of America
- Allegiance: State of Kansas
- Part of: U.S. National Guard

Commanders
- Current commander: Governor Laura Kelly
- Adjutant General: Brigadier General Paul W. Schneider

The Kansas National Guard, is the component of the United States National Guard in the U.S. state of Kansas. It comprises both the Kansas Army National Guard and the Kansas Air National Guard. The governor of Kansas is commander-in-chief of the Kansas National Guard when in state use. The state's highest-ranking military commander, the Adjutant General of Kansas, serves as the military head of the Guard and is second only to the governor.

== Background ==
The United States Constitution specifically charges the National Guard with dual federal and state missions. The National Guard is the only United States military force empowered to function in a state status. The governor may call individuals or units of the Guard into state service during emergencies or to assist in special situations which require the Guard. In its state role, the Guard serves to execute state laws, protect the public health, suppress insurrection, and repel invasion. The National Guard may be called into federal service in response to a call by the president or Congress. When National Guard troops are called to federal service, the president serves as commander-in-chief.

== Mission ==
The Kansas governor may call individuals or units of the Kansas National Guard into state service during emergencies or to assist in special situations which lend themselves to use of the National Guard. The state mission assigned to the National Guard is: "To provide trained and disciplined forces for domestic emergencies or as otherwise provided by state law." Kansas National Guardsmen serve to protect the lives and property of Kansans in response to disasters and emergencies throughout the state, including tornadoes, floods, snowstorms, and other weather-related and man-made disasters and emergencies. Through mutual aid agreements with other states, they may be called to serve with National Guard units in those states for disasters and emergencies.

The U.S. National Guard may be called into federal service in response to a call by the president or Congress. When National Guard troops are called to federal service, the president serves as commander-in-chief. The federal mission assigned to the National Guard is: "To provide properly trained and equipped units for prompt mobilization for war, National emergency or as otherwise needed."

Because of the dual missions of the National Guard, Guardsmen are required to take two oaths of enlistment; one for the United States and one for the State of Kansas.

== Active duty callups ==
Kansas National Guard units can be mobilized at any time by U.S. presidential order to supplement the regular U.S. military, and upon declaration of a state of emergency by the governor of the state in which they serve. Unlike Army Reserve members, National Guard members cannot be mobilized individually (except through voluntary transfers and Temporary Duty Assignments TDY), but only as part of their respective units.

For much of the final decades of the twentieth century, National Guard personnel typically served "One weekend a month, two weeks a year", with a portion working for the Guard in a full-time capacity. The current forces formation plans of the U.S. Army call for the typical National Guard unit (or National Guardsman) to serve one year of active duty for every three years of service. More specifically, current Department of Defense policy is that no guardsman will be involuntarily activated for a total of more than 24 months (cumulative) in one six-year enlistment period (this policy is due to change 1 August 2007, the new policy states that soldiers will be given 24 months between deployments of no more than 24 months, individual states have differing policies).

The State Guard is a theoretical military entity authorized by both the Kansas Constitution and Kansas statutes. The State Guard would be the state’s authorized militia and might assume the state mission of the Kansas National Guard in the event National Guard components are federalized. The Kansas State Guard was the official state defense force of Kansas during World War I and World War II which was created when the Kansas National Guard was federalized. It is not currently in existence, despite a failed effort in the Kansas Legislature to reactivate Kansas's state defense force.
