= Kansas Department of Commerce =

State agency in Kansas, United States

- Great Seal of the State of Kansas

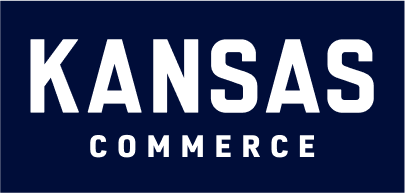

Department overview
- Headquarters: 1000 SW Jackson Street; Topeka, Kansas
- Annual budget: $147.7 million
- Department executive: David Toland, Secretary of Commerce
- Website: www.kansascommerce.gov

An older logo of the Kansas Department of Commerce, still used in some areas of their website

The Kansas Department of Commerce is a department of the government of Kansas under the Governor of Kansas. As the state's lead economic development agency, it is responsible for business recruitment and expansion, as well as workforce development. The head of the Department is the Secretary of Commerce, who is appointed by the Governor, with the approval of the Kansas Senate.

== Leadership ==
The Department is led by the Secretary of Commerce. Under Governor Laura Kelly, David Toland is currently serving as the secretary.

== Organization ==
Secretary of Commerce

- Deputy Secretary, Business and Community Development Division
  - Business Recruitment
  - Business and Technical Assistance
  - Business Finance
  - Training Services
  - Creative Arts Industries Commission
- Deputy Secretary, Workforce Services Division
  - America's Job Link Alliance
  - Employment Services and Local Areas
  - Training Services
  - Workforce Training and Education Services
  - Information Technology
- Chief Fiscal Officer, Fiscal Division
- Chief Legal Counsel, Legal and Regulatory Division
  - Human Resources
  - Kansas Athletic Commission
  - Building Services
  - Regulatory Compliance
- Executive Director, Governor's Council of Economic Advisors
- Marketing and Communications Director
- Executive Director of Business and Education Innovation
